= 2007 IAAF World Athletics Final – Results =

These are the results of the 2007 IAAF World Athletics Final, which took place in at the Gottlieb-Daimler-Stadion in Stuttgart, Germany on September 22 and September 23.

The year's top seven athletes, based on their points ranking of the 2007 IAAF World Athletics Tour, qualified to compete in each event, with an extra four athletes selected for races of 1500 metres and above. One additional athlete, a wildcard, was allocated to each event by the IAAF and replacement athletes were admitted to replace the qualified athletes that could not attend the final.

== Track ==
Key

Wild card athlete

Events
100 m	200 m	400 m	800 m	1500 m	3000 m	5000 m	110/100 m h	400 m h	3000 m st

=== 100 metres ===
Men's
Rank	Athlete	Nation	Time (sec)	Notes
1	Asafa Powell	Jamaica (JAM)	9.83	CR
2	Jaysuma Saidy Ndure	Norway (NOR)	10.06	NR
3	Michael Frater	Jamaica (JAM)	10.11	
4	Francis Obikwelu	Portugal (POR)	10.17	
5	Marlon Devonish	Great Britain (GBR)	10.18	
6	Churandy Martina	Netherlands Antilles (AHO)	10.23	
7	Matic Osovnikar	Slovenia (SLO)	10.35	
—	Olusoji Fasuba	Nigeria (NGR)	DQ	

Women's
Rank	Athlete	Nation	Time (sec)	Notes
1	Carmelita Jeter	United States (USA)	11.10	
2	Allyson Felix	United States (USA)	11.15	
3	Christine Arron	France (FRA)	11.20	
4	Kim Gevaert	Belgium (BEL)	11.29	
5	Lauryn Williams	United States (USA)	11.31	
6	Sheri-Ann Brooks	Jamaica (JAM)	11.33	
7	Ivet Lalova	Bulgaria (BUL)	11.59	
8	Joice Maduaka	Great Britain (GBR)	11.61	

=== 200 metres ===
Men's
Rank	Athlete	Nation	Time (sec)	Notes
1	Jaysuma Saidy Ndure	Norway (NOR)	19.89	NR
2	Wallace Spearmon	United States (USA)	20.18	
3	Rodney Martin	United States (USA)	20.27	
4	Johan Wissman	Sweden (SWE)	20.30	NR
5	Christopher Williams	Jamaica (JAM)	20.39	
6	Joshua J. Johnson	United States (USA)	20.48	
7	Brian Dzingai	Zimbabwe (ZIM)	20.56	
8	Paul Hession	Ireland (IRL)	20.58	

Women's
Rank	Athlete	Nation	Time (sec)	Notes
1	Muriel Hurtis	France (FRA)	22.73	
2	Debbie Ferguson	Bahamas (BAH)	22.74	
3	LaShauntea Moore	United States (USA)	22.78	
4	Kim Gevaert	Belgium (BEL)	22.84	
5	Lauryn Williams	United States (USA)	22.94	
6	Joice Maduaka	Great Britain (GBR)	23.36	
7	Stephanie Durst	United States (USA)	23.50	
—	Sheri-Ann Brooks	Jamaica (JAM)	DNS	

=== 400 metres ===
Men's
Rank	Athlete	Nation	Time (sec)	Notes
1	LaShawn Merritt	United States (USA)	44.58	
2	Tyler Christopher	Canada (CAN)	44.87	
3	Angelo Taylor	United States (USA)	44.92	
4	Gary Kikaya	DR Congo (COD)	45.58	
5	John Steffensen	Australia (AUS)	46.16	
6	Martyn Rooney	Great Britain (GBR)	46.25	
7	Alleyne Francique	Grenada (GRN)	46.27	
8	Sanjay Ayre	Jamaica (JAM)	46.32	

Women's
Rank	Athlete	Nation	Time (sec)	Notes
1	Sanya Richards	United States (USA)	49.27	WL
2	Novlene Williams	Jamaica (JAM)	50.12	
3	Christine Ohuruogu	Great Britain (GBR)	50.20	
4	Amy Thiam	Senegal (SEN)	50.33	
5	Nicola Sanders	Great Britain (GBR)	50.44	
6	Shericka Williams	Jamaica (JAM)	50.64	
7	Mary Wineberg	United States (USA)	50.73	
8	Ilona Usovich	Belarus (BLR)	51.38	

=== 800 metres ===
Men's
Rank	Athlete	Nation	Time (min)	Notes
1	Youssef Kamel	Bahrain (BHR)	1:45.61	CR
2	Mbulaeni Mulaudzi	South Africa (RSA)	1:45.67	
3	Belal Mansoor Ali	Bahrain (BHR)	1:45.93	
4	Amine Laalou	Morocco (MAR)	1:46.18	
5	Mohammed Al-Salhi	Saudi Arabia (KSA)	1:46.99	
6	Manuel Olmedo	Spain (ESP)	1:47.06	
7	Abraham Chepkirwok	Uganda (UGA)	1:47.29	
8	Dmitrijs Milkevics	Latvia (LAT)	1:47.35	

Women's
Rank	Athlete	Nation	Time (min)	Notes
1	Janeth Jepkosgei	Kenya (KEN)	1:57.87	CR
2	Mayte Martínez	Spain (ESP)	1:58.14	
3	Marilyn Okoro	Great Britain (GBR)	1:58.76	PB
4	Lucia Klocová	Slovakia (SVK)	1:58.94	
5	Brigita Langerholc	Slovenia (SLO)	1:59.56	
6	Svetlana Cherkasova	Russia (RUS)	1:59.63	
7	Elisa Cusma	Italy (ITA)	1:59.67	
8	Jemma Simpson	Great Britain (GBR)	2:00.78	

=== 1500 metres ===
Men's
Rank	Athlete	Nation	Time (min)	Notes
1	Daniel Komen	Kenya (KEN)	3:37.96	
2	Mehdi Baala	France (FRA)	3:38.35	
3	Suleiman Simotwo	Kenya (KEN)	3:38.36	
4	Alan Webb	United States (USA)	3:38.84	
5	Kevin Sullivan	Canada (CAN)	3:38.91	
6	Belal Mansoor Ali	Bahrain (BHR)	3:38.93	
7	Andrew Baddeley	Great Britain (GBR)	3:39.14	
8	Nicholas Kiptanui Kemboi	Kenya (KEN)	3:39.20	
9	Mohamed Moustaoui	Morocco (MAR)	3:42.49	
10	Shedrack Korir	Kenya (KEN)	3:47.05	

Women's
Rank	Athlete	Nation	Time (min)	Notes
1	Maryam Jamal	Bahrain (BHR)	4:01.23	
2	Yelena Soboleva	Russia (RUS)	4:05.35	
3	Sarah Jamieson	Australia (AUS)	4:05.43	
4	Agnes Samaria	Namibia (NAM)	4:05.44	NR
5	Viola Kibiwot	Kenya (KEN)	4:06.00	
6	Btissam Lakhouad	Morocco (MAR)	4:06.01	
7	Olga Yegorova	Russia (RUS)	4:07.67	
8	Yuliya Fomenko	Russia (RUS)	4:08.14	
9	Carmen Douma	Canada (CAN)	4:08.33	
10	Iryna Lishchynska	Ukraine (UKR)	4:13.82	
11	Siham Hilali	Morocco (MAR)	4:16.51	

=== 3000 metres ===
Men's
Rank	Athlete	Nation	Time (min)	Notes
1	Edwin Soi	Kenya (KEN)	7:48.81	
2	Joseph Ebuya	Kenya (KEN)	7:49.70	
3	Mohammed Farah	Great Britain (GBR)	7:49.89	
4	Craig Mottram	Australia (AUS)	7:49.89	
5	Thomas Longosiwa	Kenya (KEN)	7:50.62	
6	Eliud Kipchoge	Kenya (KEN)	7:50.93	
7	Moses Kipsiro	Uganda (UGA)	7:51.22	
8	Jonas Cheruiyot	Kenya (KEN)	7:51.26	
9	Yusuf Biwott	Kenya (KEN)	7:51.28	
10	Bisluke Kiplagat	Kenya (KEN)	8:07.01	

Women's
Rank	Athlete	Nation	Time (min)	Notes
1	Meseret Defar	Ethiopia (ETH)	8:27.24	CR
2	Vivian Jepkemoi Cheruiyot	Kenya (KEN)	8:28.66	PB
3	Priscah Jepleting Cherono	Kenya (KEN)	8:29.06	PB
4	Linet Chepkwemoi Masai	Kenya (KEN)	8:42.54	
5	Sylvia Jebiwott Kibet	Kenya (KEN)	8:46.10	
6	Jessica Augusto	Portugal (POR)	8:56.65	
7	Helen Clitheroe	Great Britain (GBR)	9:02.41	
8	Hatti Dean Archer	Great Britain (GBR)	9:16.93	
9	Bizunesh Urgesa	Ethiopia (ETH)	9:18.52	
10	Mahlet Melese	Ethiopia (ETH)	9:25.74	
11	Donna MacFarlane	Australia (AUS)	9:34.37	
—	Meselech Melkamu	Ethiopia (ETH)		DNS

=== 5000 metres ===
Men's
Rank	Athlete	Nation	Time (min)	Notes
1	Edwin Cheruiyot Soi	Kenya (KEN)	13:38.16	
2	Micah Kipkemboi Kogo	Kenya (KEN)	13:39.91	
3	Moses Ndiema Masai	Kenya (KEN)	13:39.96	
4	Joseph Ebuya	Kenya (KEN)	13:40.43	
5	Eliud Kipchoge	Kenya (KEN)	13:40.49	
6	Sileshi Sihine	Ethiopia (ETH)	13:41.04	
7	Mohamed Farah	Great Britain (GBR)	13:41.61	
8	Thomas Pkemei Longosiwa	Kenya (KEN)	13:42.39	
9	Craig Mottram	Australia (AUS)	13:42.81	
10	Shadrack Kosgei	Kenya (KEN)	13:50.61	
11	Markos Geneti	Ethiopia (ETH)	13:50.98	

Women's
Rank	Athlete	Nation	Time (min)	Notes
1	Vivian Cheruiyot	Kenya (KEN)	14:56.94	
2	Sylvia Kibet	Kenya (KEN)	14:57.37	PB
3	Priscah Cherono	Kenya (KEN)	14:58.97	
4	Linet Masai	Kenya (KEN)	15:02.74	
5	Meselech Melkamu	Ethiopia (ETH)	15:06.20	
6	Kseniya Agafonova	Russia (RUS)	15:56.35	

=== 110/100 metres hurdles ===
Men's
Rank	Athlete	Nation	Time (sec)	Notes
1	Dayron Robles	Cuba (CUB)	12.92	CR
2	David Payne	United States (USA)	13.08	
3	Terrence Trammell	United States (USA)	13.15	
4	Anwar Moore	United States (USA)	13.18	
5	Ladji Doucouré	France (FRA)	13.27	
6	Allen Johnson	United States (USA)	13.36	
7	Serhiy Demydyuk	Ukraine (UKR)	13.37	
—	Ryan Wilson	United States (USA)	—	DQ

Women's
Rank	Athlete	Nation	Time (sec)	Notes
1	Michelle Perry	United States (USA)	12.68	
2	Josephine Onyia	Spain (ESP)	12.70	
3	Delloreen Ennis	Jamaica (JAM)	12.72	
4	Perdita Felicien	Canada (CAN)	12.83	
5	Vonette Dixon	Jamaica (JAM)	12.90	
—	Sally McLellan	Australia (AUS)	—	DQ
—	Susanna Kallur	Sweden (SWE)	—	DQ
—	LoLo Jones	United States (USA)	—	DQ

=== 400 metres hurdles ===
Men's
Rank	Athlete	Nation	Time (sec)	Notes
1	Marek Plawgo	Poland (POL)	48.35	
2	Kerron Clement	United States (USA)	48.35	
3	James Carter	United States (USA)	48.36	
4	Bershawn Jackson	United States (USA)	48.58	
5	Angelo Taylor	United States (USA)	49.27	
6	Kenneth Ferguson	United States (USA)	49.45	
7	Felix Sánchez	Dominican Republic (DOM)	49.61	
8	L. J. van Zyl	South Africa (RSA)	49.62	

Women's
Rank	Athlete	Nation	Time (sec)	Notes
1	Anna Jesień	Poland (POL)	54.17	
2	Jana Rawlinson	Australia (AUS)	54.19	
3	Melaine Walker	Jamaica (JAM)	54.31	
4	Yevgeniya Isakova	Russia (RUS)	54.99	
5	Tiffany Williams	United States (USA)	55.01	
6	Natalya Ivanova	Russia (RUS)	55.60	
7	Tasha Danvers	Great Britain (GBR)	55.76	
8	Sandra Glover	United States (USA)	55.82	

=== 3000 metres steeplechase ===
Men's
Rank	Athlete	Nation	Time (min)	Notes
1	Paul Kipsiele Koech	Kenya (KEN)	8:00.67	
2	Richard Kipkemboi Mateelong	Kenya (KEN)	8:07.66	
3	Brimin Kiprop Kipruto	Kenya (KEN)	8:11.05	
4	Bouabdellah Tahri	France (FRA)	8:14.38	
5	Wesley Kiprotich	Kenya (KEN)	8:14.88	SB
6	Julius Nyamu	Kenya (KEN)	8:17.91	
7	Mustafa Mohamed	Sweden (SWE)	8:20.33	
8	Steve Slattery	United States (USA)	8:20.94	
9	Collins Kosgei	Kenya (KEN)	8:24.27	
10	Günther Weidlinger	Austria (AUT)	8:32.15	
11	Hamid Ezzine	Morocco (MAR)	8:45.22	

Women's
Rank	Athlete	Nation	Time (min)	Notes
1	Eunice Jepkorir	Kenya (KEN)	9:35.03	
2	Roisin McGettigan	Ireland (IRL)	9:35.86	
3	Cristina Casandra	Romania (ROM)	9:36.38	
4	Yekaterina Volkova	Russia (RUS)	9:40.21	
5	Korene Hinds	Jamaica (JAM)	9:40.50	
6	Helen Clitheroe	Great Britain (GBR)	9:41.59	PB
7	Donna MacFarlane	Australia (AUS)	9:41.77	
8	Hattie Dean	Great Britain (GBR)	9:41.86	
9	Mardrea Hyman	Jamaica (JAM)	9:51.03	
10	Lisa Galaviz	United States (USA)	9:51.73	

== Field ==
Events
High jump	Pole vault	Long jump	Triple jump	Shot put	Discus	Hammer	Javelin

=== High jump ===
Men's
Rank	Athlete	Nation	Result (m)	Notes
1	Donald Thomas	Bahamas (BAH)	2.32	
2	Stefan Holm	Sweden (SWE)	2.30	
3	Linus Thörnblad	Sweden (SWE)	2.27	
4	Germaine Mason	Great Britain (GBR)	2.27	
5	Tora Harris	United States (USA)	2.27	
6	Yaroslav Rybakov	Russia (RUS)	2.27	
7	Tomáš Janku	Czech Republic (CZE)	2.24	
8	Jesse Williams	United States (USA)	2.24	

Women's
Rank	Athlete	Nation	Result (m)	Notes
1	Blanka Vlašić	Croatia (CRO)	2.00	
2	Antonietta Di Martino	Italy (ITA)	1.97	
3	Anna Chicherova	Russia (RUS)	1.97	
4	Yelena Slesarenko	Russia (RUS)	1.94	
5	Amy Acuff	United States (USA)	1.94	
6	Vita Palamar	Ukraine (UKR)	1.94	
7	Ruth Beitia	Spain (ESP)	1.94	
8	Emma Green	Sweden (SWE)	1.85	

=== Pole vault ===
Men's
Rank	Athlete	Nation	Result (m)	Notes
1	Brad Walker	United States (USA)	5.91	
2	Björn Otto	Germany (GER)	5.86	
3	Steven Hooker	Australia (AUS)	5.81	
4	Danny Ecker	Germany (GER)	5.81	
5	Denys Yurchenko	Ukraine (UKR)	5.70	
6	Jeff Hartwig	United States (USA)	5.70	
7	Tim Lobinger	Germany (GER)	5.60	
8	Igor Pavlov	Russia (RUS)	5.60	

Women's
Rank	Athlete	Nation	Result (m)	Notes
1	Yelena Isinbaeva	Russia (RUS)	4.87	CR
2	Monika Pyrek	Poland (POL)	4.82	PB
3	Svetlana Feofanova	Russia (RUS)	4.82	SB
4	Tatyana Polnova	Russia (RUS)	4.67	
5	Yuliya Golubchikova	Russia (RUS)	4.60	
6	Kateřina Baďurová	Czech Republic (CZE)	4.60	
7	Silke Spiegelburg	Germany (GER)	4.60	PB
8	Vanessa Boslak	France (FRA)	4.60	

=== Long jump ===
Men's
Rank	Athlete	Nation	Result (m)	Notes
1	Andrew Howe	Italy (ITA)	8.35	
2	Brian Johnson	United States (USA)	8.16	
3	Godfrey Mokoena	South Africa (RSA)	8.12	
4	Christian Reif	Germany (GER)	8.01	
5	Christopher Tomlinson	Great Britain (GBR)	7.93	
6	Olexiy Lukashevych	Ukraine (UKR)	7.78	
7	John Moffitt	United States (USA)	7.72	
8	Miguel Pate	United States (USA)	7.71	

Women's
Rank	Athlete	Nation	Result (m)	Notes
1	Tatyana Lebedeva	Russia (RUS)	6.78	
2	Grace Upshaw	United States (USA)	6.64	
3	Oksana Udmurtova	Russia (RUS)	6.52	
4	Kumiko Ikeda	Japan (JPN)	6.48	
5	Keila Costa	Brazil (BRA)	6.46	
6	Bianca Kappler	Germany (GER)	6.42	
7	Malgorzata Trybanska	Poland (POL)	6.36	
8	Rose Richmond	United States (USA)	6.32	

=== Triple jump ===
Men's
Rank	Athlete	Nation	Result (m)	Notes
1	Walter Davis	United States (USA)	17.35	SB
2	Aarik Wilson	United States (USA)	17.34	
3	Nelson Évora	Portugal (POR)	17.30	
4	Randy Lewis	Grenada (GRN)	17.21	
5	Leevan Sands	Bahamas (BAH)	17.07	
6	Jadel Gregório	Brazil (BRA)	16.95	
7	Dmitrij Valukevic	Slovakia (SVK)	16.63	
8	Aleksandr Petrenko	Russia (RUS)	16.44	

Women's
Rank	Athlete	Nation	Result (m)	Notes
1	Yargelis Savigne	Cuba (CUB)	14.78	
2	Tatyana Lebedeva	Russia (RUS)	14.72	
3	Yamilé Aldama	Sudan (SUD)	14.41	
4	Marija Šestak	Slovenia (SLO)	14.31	
5	Keila Costa	Brazil (BRA)	14.13	
6	Carlota Castrejana	Spain (ESP)	13.91	
7	Dana Veldáková	Slovakia (SVK)	13.81	
—	Hrysopiyí Devetzí	Greece (GRE)	DQ	Originally third with 14.65; Disqualified for doping

=== Shot put ===
Men's
Rank	Athlete	Nation	Result (m)	Notes
1	Reese Hoffa	United States (USA)	20.98	
2	Adam Nelson	United States (USA)	20.95	
3	Andrei Mikhnevich	Belarus (BLR)	20.88	
4	Dan Taylor	United States (USA)	20.74	
5	Christian Cantwell	United States (USA)	20.25	
6	Rutger Smith	Netherlands (NED)	20.01	
7	Ralf Bartels	Germany (GER)	19.49	
8	Garrett Johnson	United States (USA)	19.26	

Women's
Rank	Athlete	Nation	Result (m)	Notes
1	Nadzeya Ostapchuk	Belarus (BLR)	20.45	CR
2	Valerie Vili	New Zealand (NZL)	20.40	
3	Nadine Kleinert	Germany (GER)	19.36	
4	Petra Lammert	Germany (GER)	19.12	
5	Cleopatra Borel	Trinidad and Tobago (TRI)	18.66	
6	Chiara Rosa	Italy (ITA)	17.82	
7	Kristin Heaston	United States (USA)	17.26	
—	Iolanta Ulyeva	Kazakhstan (KAZ)	DNS	

=== Discus throw ===
Men's
Rank	Athlete	Nation	Result (m)	Notes
1	Gerd Kanter	Estonia (EST)	66.54	
2	Virgilijus Alekna	Lithuania (LTU)	65.94	
3	Piotr Małachowski	Poland (POL)	65.35	
4	Robert Harting	Germany (GER)	65.25	
5	Mario Pestano	Spain (ESP)	63.25	
6	Jarred Rome	United States (USA)	62.05	
7	Zoltán Kővágó	Hungary (HUN)	61.58	
8	Ian Waltz	United States (USA)	61.14	

Women's
Rank	Athlete	Nation	Result (m)	Notes
1	Franka Dietzsch	Germany (GER)	62.58	
2	Vera Pospíšilová-Cechlová	Czech Republic (CZE)	62.04	
3	Nicoleta Grasu	Romania (ROU)	61.75	
4	Becky Breisch	United States (USA)	60.26	
5	Beatrice Faumuina	New Zealand (NZL)	58.68	
6	Suzanne Powell Roos	United States (USA)	57.85	
7	Anna Söderberg	Sweden (SWE)	57.54	
8	Elisângela Adriano	Brazil (BRA)	54.10	

=== Hammer throw ===
Men's
Rank	Athlete	Nation	Result (m)	Notes
1	Ivan Tsikhan	Belarus (BLR)	82.05	
2	Krisztián Pars	Hungary (HUN)	78.42	
3	Koji Murofushi	Japan (JPN)	77.95	
4	Miloslav Konopka	Slovakia (SVK)	77.95	
5	Vadim Devyatovskiy	Belarus (BLR)	77.81	
6	Primož Kozmus	Slovenia (SLO)	76.78	
7	Libor Charfreitag	Slovakia (SVK)	75.89	
8	Szymon Ziółkowski	Poland (POL)	74.54	

Women's
Rank	Athlete	Nation	Result (m)	Notes
1	Yipsi Moreno	Cuba (CUB)	73.76	
2	Ivana Brkljacic	Croatia (CRO)	73.22	
3	Clarissa Claretti	Italy (ITA)	70.34	
4	Kamila Skolimowska	Poland (POL)	70.20	
5	Arasay Thondike	Cuba (CUB)	69.51	
6	Kathrin Klaas	Germany (GER)	69.00	
7	Ester Balassini	Italy (ITA)	63.90	

=== Javelin throw ===
Men's
Rank	Athlete	Nation	Result (m)	Notes
1	Tero Pitkämäki	Finland (FIN)	88.19	
2	Andreas Thorkildsen	Norway (NOR)	85.06	
3	Magnus Arvidsson	Sweden (SWE)	83.37	
4	Teemu Wirkkala	Finland (FIN)	80.20	
5	Eriks Rags	Latvia (LAT)	77.40	
6	Aleksandr Ivanov	Russia (RUS)	76.09	
7	Stefan Wenk	Germany (GER)	75.87	
8	Peter Esenwein	Germany (GER)	72.91	

Women's
Rank	Athlete	Nation	Result (m)	Notes
1	Barbora Špotáková	Czech Republic (CZE)	67.12	NR
2	Steffi Nerius	Germany (GER)	64.90	
3	Christina Obergföll	Germany (GER)	62.47	
4	Barbara Madejczyk	Poland (POL)	60.03	
5	Sonia Bisset	Cuba (CUB)	59.23	
6	Nikola Brejchová	Czech Republic (CZE)	58.27	
7	Mercedes Chilla	Spain (ESP)	58.25	
8	Linda Stahl	Germany (GER)	55.62	
