= 2007 IAAF Golden League =

Athletics competition series

The 2007 Golden League was the tenth edition of the IAAF's annual series of six athletics meets, held across Europe, with athletes having the chance to win the Golden League Jackpot of $1 million.

== Jackpot events ==
- Men
  - 100 m
  - 1500 m / Mile
  - 110 m hurdles
  - Triple Jump
  - Javelin throw
- Women
  - 100 m
  - 400 m
  - 100 m hurdles
  - High Jump
  - Pole Vault

The 2007 series included meets at

- Oslo, Norway (Bislett Games) on June 15.
- Paris, France (Meeting Gaz de France) on July 6.
- Rome, Italy (Golden Gala) on July 13.
- Zürich, Switzerland (Weltklasse Zürich) on September 7.
- Brussels, Belgium (Memorial Van Damme) on September 14.
- Berlin, Germany (ISTAF) on September 16.

== Bislett Games ==
Held in Oslo, Norway on June 15, at the Bislett Stadium. Meseret Defar's Women's 5000 m World Record somewhat overshadowed the Jackpot events in Oslo, but some interesting Jackpot contenders emerged.

=== Men's 100 m ===
World Record-holder, Asafa Powell, took the event in 9.94.

Wind: +0.9 m/s

Position	Country	Athlete	Time
1	Jamaica	Asafa Powell	9.94
2	Portugal	Francis Obikwelu	10.06
3	Nigeria	Olusoji Fasuba	10.25
4	Great Britain	Mark Lewis-Francis	10.25
5	Trinidad and Tobago	Marc Burns	10.26
6	Trinidad and Tobago	Darrell Brown	10.61
DQ	Great Britain	Marlon Devonish	(10.08)

=== Men's 1500 m ===
(Held as Mile) Moroccan Adil Kaouch produced a personal best to win this event from Augustine Choge of Kenya and Andrew Baddeley of Great Britain. Australian Craig Mottram finished ninth.

Position	Country	Athlete	Time
1	Morocco	Adil Kaouch	3:51.14
2	Kenya	Augustine Choge	3:51.62
3	Great Britain	Andrew Baddeley	3:51.95
4	Kenya	Daniel Kipchirchir Komen	3:52.19
5	Spain	Arturo Casado	3:52.35
6	Spain	Sergio Gallardo	3:52.38
7	Kenya	Isaac Kiprono Songok	3:52.85
8	Kenya	Suleiman Simotwo	3:53.08
9	Australia	Craig Mottram	3:54.57
10	Kenya	Alex Kipchirchir	3:55.96
11	Algeria	Tarek Boukensa	3:56.37
12	Morocco	Abdalaati Iguider	3:59.79
DNF	Kenya	Philemon Kipkorir Kimutai	-
DNF	Kenya	Gilbert Kipchoge	-

=== Men's 110 m Hurdles ===
USA's Anwar Moore took a narrow victory in the absence of World Record-holder Liu Xiang, Cuban Dayron Robles, and top Americans such as Terrence Trammell and Dominique Arnold.

Wind: -0.3 m/s

Position	Country	Athlete	Time
1	United States	Anwar Moore	13.26
2	United States	David Payne	13.27
3	Germany	Thomas Blaschek	13.46
4	United States	Joel Brown	13.51
5	Great Britain	Andy Turner	13.56
6	Spain	Jackson Quiñónez	13.65
7	Netherlands	Gregory Sedoc	13.73
8	United States	David Oliver	13.75

=== Men's Triple Jump ===
Great Britain's Phillips Idowu took a surprise victory from Olympic and European champion Christian Olsson and World Leader Jadel Gregório.

Position	Country	Athlete	Distance
1	Great Britain	Phillips Idowu	17.35
2	Sweden	Christian Olsson	17.33
3	United States	Aarik Wilson	17.26
4	Great Britain	Nathan Douglas	17.18
5	Brazil	Jadel Gregório	17.12
6	United States	Walter Davis	17.00
7	Portugal	Nelson Évora	16.92
8	Norway	Lars Ytterhaugh	15.41

=== Men's Javelin ===
Finn Tero Pitkämäki out-threw Olympic champion and home crowd favorite Andreas Thorkildsen, and in-form American Breaux Greer.

Position	Country	Athlete	Distance
1	Finland	Tero Pitkämäki	88.78
2	United States	Breaux Greer	88.73
3	Norway	Andreas Thorkildsen	87.79
4	Cuba	Guillermo Martínez	85.30
5	Sweden	Magnus Arvidsson	84.10
6	Russia	Sergey Makarov	83.88
7	Russia	Aleksandr Ivanov	81.95
8	Finland	Teemu Wirkkala	80.72
NM	Latvia	Vadims Vasilevskis	-

=== Women's 100 m ===
American Stephanie Durst continued her good form to take victory ahead of Sheri-Ann Brooks.

Wind: -0.2 m/s

Position	Country	Athlete	Time
1	United States	Stephanie Durst	11.22
2	Jamaica	Sheri-Ann Brooks	11.23
3	Cayman Islands	Cydonie Mothersille	11.25
4	Belgium	Kim Gevaert	11.25
5	Bahamas	Debbie Ferguson-McKenzie	11.27
6	Bulgaria	Ivet Lalova	11.32
7	Norway	Ezinne Okparaebo	11.56
8	Jamaica	Sherone Simpson	11.64

=== Women's 400 m ===
Sanya Richards took an expected victory from former World Champion Amy Mbacke Thiam of Senegal.

Position	Country	Athlete	Time
1	United States	Sanya Richards	50.26
2	Senegal	Amy Mbacke Thiam	51.22
3	Jamaica	Shericka Williams	51.32
4	Australia	Tamsyn Lewis	51.86
5	Bahamas	Christine Amertil	52.02
6	Great Britain	Marilyn Okoro	52.80
7	Estonia	Maris Mägi	54.36
DNS	Jamaica	Kaliese Spencer	-

=== Women's 100 m Hurdles ===
World Champion Michelle Perry extended her winning streak to 14 races, beating top European Susanna Kallur.

- Wind: -0.1m/s

Position	Country	Athlete	Time
1	United States	Michelle Perry	12.70
2	Sweden	Susanna Kallur	12.76
3	Jamaica	Delloreen Ennis-London	12.78
4	Canada	Angela Whyte	12.87
5	Nigeria	Josephine Onyia	12.93
6	Germany	Kirsten Bolm	13.15
7	Ireland	Derval O'Rourke	13.19
DNS	Jamaica	Brigitte Foster-Hylton	-

=== Women's High Jump ===
Olympic and World Indoor Champion, Yelena Slesarenko, beat a star-studded field which included the European Champion indoors and outdoors, Tia Hellebaut, World Champion outdoors and World Record-holder indoors, Kajsa Bergqvist, and four other jumpers who had been over 2 meters this year.

Position	Country	Athlete	Height
1	Russia	Yelena Slesarenko	2.02
2	Croatia	Blanka Vlašić	1.98
3	Ukraine	Vita Palamar	1.96
4	Belgium	Tia Hellebaut	1.96
5	Sweden	Kajsa Bergqvist	1.93
6	Spain	Ruth Beitia	1.90
6	Italy	Antonietta Di Martino	1.90
8	Canada	Nicole Forrester	1.85
9	Russia	Anna Chicherova	1.85
9	Sweden	Carolina Klüft	1.85

=== Women's Pole Vault ===
Olympic, World, and European Champion, Yelena Isinbayeva, who also holds both the indoor and outdoor World Records, took a highly anticipated victory ahead of Polish rival Monika Pyrek.

Position	Country	Athlete	Height
1	Russia	Yelena Isinbayeva	4.85
2	Poland	Monika Pyrek	4.60
3	Russia	Tatyana Polnova	4.55
4	Russia	Yuliya Golubchikova	4.55
5	Brazil	Fabiana Murer	4.45
6	Czech Republic	Kateřina Baďurová	4.30
7	Germany	Silke Spiegelburg	4.30
8	Norway	Cathrine Larsåsen	4.00

=== Jackpot Contenders ===
==== Men ====
100 m: Asafa Powell (Jamaica)

1500 m: Adil Kaouch (Morocco)

110 m Hurdles: Anwar Moore (United States)

Triple Jump: Phillips Idowu (Great Britain)

Javelin: Tero Pitkämäki (Finland)

==== Women ====
100 m: Stephanie Durst (United States)

400 m: Sanya Richards (United States)

100 m Hurdles: Michelle Perry (United States)

High Jump: Yelena Slesarenko (Russia)

Pole Vault: Yelena Isinbayeva (Russia)

== Meeting Gaz de France ==
Held in Paris, France, at the nine-lane track of the Stade de France, on July 6.

=== Men's 100 m ===
Asafa Powell (winner in Oslo), battling with injury, did not run in Paris, and so was out of the Jackpot race before it had started. In his absence, Bahamian, Derrick Atkins, won in 10.00 seconds.

- Wind: -0.1 m/s

Position	Country	Athlete	Time
1	Bahamas	Derrick Atkins	10.00
2	United States	Mark Jelks	10.09
3	United States	Shawn Crawford	10.13
4	Jamaica	Clement Campbell	10.13
5	Netherlands Antilles	Churandy Martina	10.13
6	United States	Leonard Scott	10.14
7	Jamaica	Steve Mullings	10.16
8	France	David Alerte	10.26
9	Jamaica	Michael Frater	10.29

=== Men's 1500 m ===
Adil Kaouch, winner in Oslo, was also injured and out of the Jackpot race, but a thrilling race ensued, with Alan Webb's sprint for home beating the valiant efforts of home-crowd favorite Mehdi Baala.

Position	Country	Athlete	Time
1	United States	Alan Webb	3:30.54
2	France	Mehdi Baala	3:31.01
3	Algeria	Tarek Boukensa	3:32.77
4	Kenya	Shedrack Kibet Korir	3:32.81
5	Canada	Kevin Sullivan	3:34.16
6	Kenya	Suleiman Kipses Simotowo	3:34.78
7	United States	Bernard Lagat	3:35.09
8	France	Mounir Yemmouni	3:35.29
9	Algeria	Antar Zerguelaine	3:36.51
10	Algeria	Abdelslam Kennouche	3:38.29
11	Kenya	Geoffrey Kipkoech Rono	3:38.90
DNF	Algeria	Kamal Boulahfane	-
DNF	Kenya	Philemon Kipkorir Kimutai	-

=== Men's 110 m Hurdles ===
Olympic Champion Liu Xiang and World Champion Ladji Doucouré were in Paris to outrun Oslo winner Anwar Moore, but it was only the young Cuban Dayron Robles who could out-dip the American this occasion, as the two were awarded the same time, 13.13.

- Wind: +0.5 m/s

Position	Country	Athlete	Time
1	Cuba	Dayron Robles	13.13
2	United States	Anwar Moore	13.13
3	China	Liu Xiang	13.15
4	United States	Ryan Wilson	13.17
5	United States	David Oliver	13.27
6	France	Ladji Doucouré	13.27
7	United States	Dominique Arnold	13.31
8	United States	Aries Merritt	13.37
9	China	Shi Dongpeng	13.39

=== Men's Triple Jump ===
Again, the Oslo winner, Phillips Idowu, was injured and out of the Jackpot race, but Christian Olsson made up for his disappointment at the Bislett Games, by winning with 17.56.

Position	Country	Athlete	Distance
1	Sweden	Christian Olsson	17.56
2	Portugal	Nelson Évora	17.28
3	United States	Aarik Wilson	16.96
4	Brazil	Jadel Gregorio	16.90
5	Cuba	Osniel Tosca	16.85
6	Russia	Aleksandr Petrenko	16.85
7	Cuba	Yoandri Betanzos	16.54
8	Russia	Danil Burkenya	16.50
9	France	Julien Kapek	16.45
10	United States	Walter Davis	16.44
11	Greece	Dimítrios Tsiámis	15.98

=== Men's Javelin ===
Tero Pitkämäki was the only male winner from Oslo to win in Paris, doing so in a European Lead of 89.70. Three of his five valid throws would have been enough to win as he produced a peerless series of throw, ahead of rival Andreas Thorkildsen.

Position	Country	Athlete	Distance
1	Finland	Tero Pitkämäki	89.70
2	Norway	Andreas Thorkildsen	86.28
3	United States	Breaux Greer	85.64
4	Cuba	Guillermo Martínez	83.94
5	Russia	Aleksandr Ivanov	80.72
6	South Africa	John Robert Oosthuizen	80.58
7	Sweden	Magnus Arvidsson	80.02
8	France	Vitoli Tipotio	79.81
NM	Canada	Scott Russell	-

=== Women's 100 m ===
Stephanie Durst did not venture to Paris and was out of the jackpot race. Torri Edwards won in a race with Americans occupying the top four places.

- Wind: +0.5 m/s

Position	Country	Athlete	Time
1	United States	Torri Edwards	11.17
2	United States	Me'Lisa Barber	11.19
3	United States	Lauryn Williams	11.25
4	United States	Carmelita Jeter	11.26
5	France	Muriel Hurtis-Houari	11.31
6	France	Christine Arron	11.34
7	United States	Allyson Felix	11.34
DNS	Bahamas	Debbie Ferguson-McKenzie	-
DNS	Jamaica	Kerron Stewart	-

=== Women's 400 m ===
Sanya Richards produced a World Lead to win, in a race which included all three women who out-did her for a place on the USA's World Championships team.

Position	Country	Athlete	Time
1	United States	Sanya Richards	49.52
2	Jamaica	Novlene Williams	50.29
3	United States	Natasha Hastings	50.45
4	Senegal	Amy Mbacke Thiam	50.84
5	United States	Mary Wineberg	50.91
6	United States	DeeDee Trotter	51.12
7	Jamaica	Shericka Williams	51.63
8	France	Solen Désert	51.66

=== Women's 100 m hurdles ===
Michelle Perry was one of the few to repeat her Oslo win, outrunning Susanna Kallur, again, remaining in the hunt for the Jackpot.

- Wind: -0.2 m/s

Position	Country	Athlete	Time
1	United States	Michelle Perry	12.56
2	Sweden	Susanna Kallur	12.68
3	United States	Lolo Jones	12.71
4	France	Adrianna Lamalle	12.75
5	Canada	Perdita Felicien	12.88
6	Jamaica	Vonette Dixon	12.91
7	Canada	Priscilla Lopes	13.10
8	Jamaica	Delloreen Ennis-London	13.32
DNF	United States	Ginnie Powell	DNF

=== Women's High Jump ===
Oslo winner Yelena Slesarenko could only manage a second-place finish as Blanka Vlašić impressed with 2.02 meters, with both women jumping 2 or more meters.

Position	Country	Athlete	Height
1	Croatia	Blanka Vlašić	2.02
2	Russia	Yelena Slesarenko	2.00
3	Belgium	Tia Hellebaut	1.97
4	Spain	Ruth Beitia	1.94
5	Italy	Antonietta Di Martino	1.94
6	United States	Amy Acuff	1.94
7	Ukraine	Vita Palamar	1.91
8	Kazakhstan	Marina Aitova	1.91
9	Canada	Nicole Forrester	1.88
10	France	Melanie Skotnik	1.88

=== Women's Pole Vault ===
Yelena Isinbayeva regained exciting form as she sailed over 4.91 m, which she followed with the attempts at a would-be World Record of 5.02. European Indoor Champion, Svetlana Feofanova returned to heights not seen, from her, this season, as she finished second with 4.71.

Position	Country	Athlete	Height
1	Russia	Yelena Isinbayeva	4.91
2	Russia	Svetlana Feofanova	4.71
3	Poland	Monika Pyrek	4.71
4	Czech Republic	Katerina Badurová	4.61
5	Germany	Silke Spiegelburg	4.51
6	Russia	Yuliya Golubchikova	4.51
7	Russia	Tatyana Polnova	4.51
8	France	Vanessa Boslak	4.41
9	Germany	Carolin Hingst	4.41
10	Australia	Kym Howe	4.21
11	United States	Niki McEwen	4.21
DNS	Australia	Alana Boyd	-

=== Jackpot Contenders ===
With three Oslo winners injured and two choosing not to compete in Paris, only six athletes were still in the Jackpot race before the Meeting Gaz de France had begun. Two of those six finished second in their respective events, and only four remain in contention after Paris.

==== Men ====
Javelin: Tero Pitkämäki (Finland)

==== Women ====
400 m: Sanya Richards (United States) 100 m Hurdles: Michelle Perry (United States) Pole Vault: Yelena Isinbayeva (Russia)

== Golden Gala ==
The third stop of the Golden League took place at Rome's Stadio Olimpico, on June 13, 2007. This meet hit headlines, as French long jumper Salim Sdiri was hit by a rogue javelin, thrown by Finn Tero Pitkämäki, as he warmed up for his event. The injuries sustained, however, were not serious and Sdiri made a full recovery.

=== Men's 100 m ===
Asafa Powell took his second Golden League victory, beating Paris winner Derrick Atkins who took second.

- Wind: +0.5 m/s

Position	Country	Athlete	Time
1.	Jamaica	Asafa Powell	9.90
2.	Bahamas	Derrick Atkins	10.02
3.	Netherlands Antilles	Churandy Martina	10.10
4.	United States	Mark Jelks	10.17
5.	Jamaica	Nesta Carter	10.19
6.	Italy	Simone Collio	10.19
7.	Jamaica	Michael Frater	10.22
8.	United States	Shawn Crawford	10.22
9.	United States	Leonard Scott	10.23

=== Men's 1500 m ===
Adil Kaouch also took a second Golden League victory, in a Personal Best, with several other athletes recording the best results of their lives.

Position	Country	Athlete	Time
1.	Morocco	Adil Kaouch	3:30.77
2.	Algeria	Tarek Boukensa	3:30.92
3.	Kenya	Shedrack Kibet Korir	3:31.18
4.	Kenya	Alex Kipchirchir	3:31.58
5.	Kenya	Suleiman Kipses Simotwo	3:31.89
6.	Spain	Juan Carlos Higuero	3:32.18
7.	Kenya	Daniel Kipchirchir Komen	3:32.55
8.	Morocco	Abdalaati Iguider	3:32.75
9.	Spain	Sergio Gallardo	3:33.43
10.	Spain	Arturo Casado	3:34.09
11.	Ukraine	Ivan Heshko	3:35.03
12.	Algeria	Antar Zerguelaine	3:35.18
13.	Italy	Christian Obrist	3:35.75
DNF.	Kenya	Philemon Kipkorir Kimutai	-
DNF.	Kenya	Timothy Kiptanui	-
DNF.	Kenya	Samson Surum	-

=== Men's 110 m Hurdles ===
Oslo winner Anwar Moore won a close-run race from Paris winner Dayron Robles.

Position	Country	Athlete	Time
1.	United States	Anwar Moore	13.16
2.	Cuba	Dayron Robles	13.17
3.	United States	David Oliver	13.36
4.	United States	Allen Johnson	13.50
5.	France	Ladji Doucouré	13.51
6.	United States	Aries Merritt	13.56
7.	Brazil	Anselmo da Silva	13.64
8.	United States	Dominique Arnold	13.80
DNF	United States	David Payne	-

=== Men's Triple Jump ===
Christian Olsson only took two attempts before retiring, a foul and a jump which turned out to be a winning mark.

Position	Country	Athlete	Distance
1.	Sweden	Christian Olsson	17.19
2.	Cuba	Osniel Tosca	17.10
3.	Russia	Danil Burkenya	17.02
4.	United States	Aarik Wilson	16.98
5.	Brazil	Jadel Gregório	16.92
6.	Romania	Marian Oprea	16.67
7.	Grenada	Randy Lewis	16.58
8.	Portugal	Nelson Évora	16.52
9.	Greece	Konstadinos Zalagitis	16.29
10.	Italy	Fabrizio Schembri	15.61

=== Men's Javelin ===
Tero Pitkämäki plummeted out of the jackpot race, as Olympic champion Andreas Thorkildsen took the win. However, this competition was more memorable for a freak accident concerning Pitkämäki and French long jumper Salim Sdiri. On the Finn's second throw, his javelin veered off to the left and into the long jump area, where Sdiri was warming up. The implement hit Sdiri in his side but no serious injuries were sustained. The incident clearly had an adverse effect on Pitkämäki, however, as he failed to match his first round effort of 86.09 m.

Position	Country	Athlete	Distance
1.	Norway	Andreas Thorkildsen	88.36
2.	Finland	Tero Pitkämäki	86.09
3.	United States	Breaux Greer	84.53
4.	Sweden	Magnus Arvidsson	84.44
5.	South Africa	Gerhardus Pienaar	81.89
6.	South Africa	John Robert Oosthuizen	81.22
7.	Russia	Aleksandr Ivanov	80.27
8.	Latvia	Vadims Vasilevskis	79.47
9.	Russia	Sergey Makarov	79.28
10.	Finland	Teemu Wirkkala	78.41
11.	Cuba	Guillermo Martínez	72.34

=== Women's 100 m ===
Torri Edwards continued her fine season with a win over compatriot Me'Lisa Barber and top European Tezzhan Naimova, as Allyson Felix finished fourth.

Position	Country	Athlete	Time
1.	United States	Torri Edwards	11.03
2.	United States	Me'Lisa Barber	11.11
3.	Bulgaria	Tezzhan Naimova	11.14
4.	United States	Allyson Felix	11.18
5.	United States	Marshevet Hooker	11.21
6.	United States	Carmelita Jeter	11.22
7.	United States	Rachelle Boone-Smith	11.23
8.	Cayman Islands	Cydonie Mothersille	11.25
9.	Italy	Anita Pistone	11.45

=== Women's 400 m ===
Sanya Richards remained in the jackpot hunt with a graceful performance ahead of 2001 World champion Amy Mbackie Thiam, who set her fastest time for four years.

Position	Country	Athlete	Time
1.	United States	Sanya Richards	49.77
2.	Senegal	Amy Mbacke Thiam	50.15
3.	United States	Natasha Hastings	50.34
4.	Jamaica	Novlene Williams	50.39
5.	United States	DeeDee Trotter	51.05
6.	Jamaica	Shericka Williams	51.10
7.	United States	Mary Wineberg	51.20
8.	Belarus	Ilona Usovich	51.75
9.	Italy	Daniela Reina	53.12

=== Women's 100 m Hurdles ===
Michelle Perry set a world lead to win, as Susanna Kallur was disappointed to finish third.

Position	Country	Athlete	Time
1.	United States	Michelle Perry	12.44
2.	Spain	Josephine Onyia	12.67
3.	Sweden	Susanna Kallur	12.72
4.	United States	Lolo Jones	12.84
5.	Jamaica	Delloreen Ennis-London	12.85
6.	United States	Danielle Carruthers	12.97
7.	France	Adrianna Lamalle	13.22
8.	Italy	Micol Cattaneo	13.27
DNF	United States	Nichole Denby	-

=== Women's High Jump ===
Blanka Vlašić took her second Golden League win of the season, as two athletes went over 2 m. Antonietta Di Martino, who had hoped to perform well in front of her home crowd, disappointed, finishing fourth.

Position	Country	Athlete	Height
1.	Croatia	Blanka Vlašić	2.02
2.	Sweden	Kajsa Bergqvist	2.00
3.	Spain	Ruth Beitia	1.98
4.	Italy	Antonietta Di Martino	1.95
5.	United States	Amy Acuff	1.95
6.	Sweden	Emma Green	1.95
7.	Ukraine	Vita Palamar	1.90
8.	Ukraine	Vita Styopina	1.90
9.	Sweden	Carolina Klüft	1.85
10.	Belgium	Tia Hellebaut	1.85
11.	China	Xingjuan Zheng	1.85
NM	Italy	Elena Meuti	-

=== Women's Pole Vault ===
Yelena Isinbayeva took a clear victory to keep her hopes of a jackpot share alive. Isinbayeva missed her first attempt at 4.65 m, then passed to 4.70, which she cleared first time, then came a failure at 4.85, attempts were passed to 4.90, which was routinely cleared at the first attempt. None of the three world record attempts at 5.02 m were close.

Position	Country	Athlete	Height
1.	Russia	Yelena Isinbayeva	4.90
2.	Czech Republic	Kateřina Baďurová	4.65
3.	Russia	Tatyana Polnova	4.65
4.	Russia	Yuliya Golubchikova	4.60
=.	Poland	Monika Pyrek	4.60
6.	Russia	Svetlana Feofanova	4.50
=.	Australia	Kym Howe	4.50
8.	Spain	Naroa Agirre	4.50
9.	United States	April Steiner	4.30
10.	Italy	Arianna Farfaletti Casali	4.10
DNS	United States	Jennifer Stuczynski	-

=== Jackpot contenders ===
Tero Pitkämäki was the only casualty of the meeting, as three women remained in the jackpot hunt.

==== Women ====
400 m: Sanya Richards (United States), 100 m Hurdles: Michelle Perry (United States), Pole Vault: Yelena Isinbayeva (Russia)

== Weltklasse Zürich ==
Held in Zürich, Switzerland, at the Letzigrund stadium, on September 7.

=== Men's 100 m ===
Wind: +0.1 m/s

Position	Country	Athlete	Time
1.	Portugal	Francis Obikwelu	10.17
2.	Norway	Jaysuma Saidy Ndure	10.20
3.	Great Britain	Marlon Devonish	10.20
4.	Nigeria	Olusoji Fasuba	10.20
5.	United States	Leroy Dixon	10.23
6.	Trinidad and Tobago	Marc Burns	10.36
7.	Slovenia	Matic Osovnikar	10.40
8.	Great Britain	Craig Pickering	10.58
9.	Great Britain	Mark Lewis-Francis	10.60

=== Men's 1500 m ===
Position	Country	Athlete	Time
1.	France	Mehdi Baala	3:38.62
2.	Algeria	Tarek Boukensa	3:38.84
3.	Kenya	Daniel Kipchirchir Komen	3:38.96
4.	Algeria	Antar Zerguelaine	3:39.18
5.	Kenya	Asbel Kiprop	3:39.31
6.	Italy	Christian Obrist	3:39.50
7.	United States	Alan Webb	3:39.69
8.	Kenya	Alex Kipchirchir	3:39.84
9.	Bahrain	Belal Mansoor Ali	3:40.21
10.	Kenya	Suleiman Simotwo	3:40.52
11.	Great Britain	Andrew Baddeley	3:40.75
12.	Spain	Arturo Casado	3:44.38

=== Men's 110 m Hurdles ===
Wind: -0.2 m/s

Position	Country	Athlete	Time
1.	Cuba	Dayron Robles	13.15
2.	United States	Terrence Trammell	13.22
3.	United States	Allen Johnson	13.23
4.	United States	Anwar Moore	13.24
5.	United States	Ryan Wilson	13.33
6.	United States	David Oliver	13.37
7.	United States	David Payne	13.39
8.	United States	Aries Merritt	13.42
9.	Switzerland	Andreas Kundert	13.61

=== Men's Triple Jump ===
Position	Country	Athlete	Distance
1.	United States	Walter Davis	17.20
2.	Portugal	Nelson Évora	17.18
3.	United States	Aarik Wilson	17.11
4.	Brazil	Jadel Gregório	16.86
5.	Russia	Aleksandr Petrenko	16.79
6.	Slovakia	Dmitrij Valukevic	16.60
7.	Switzerland	Alexander Martínez	16.59
8.	Ukraine	Mykola Savolaynen	16.40

=== Men's Javelin ===
Position	Country	Athlete	Distance
1.	Norway	Andreas Thorkildsen	89.51
2.	Finland	Tero Pitkämäki	87.44
3.	United States	Breaux Greer	83.15
4.	Sweden	Magnus Arvidsson	82.47
5.	Russia	Alexandr Ivanov	81.00
6.	Poland	Igor Janik	80.09
7.	Latvia	Vadims Vasiļevskis	78.20
8.	Switzerland	Felix Loretz	75.62
9.	Switzerland	Stefan Müller	70.52

=== Women's 100 m ===
Wind: -0.1 m/s

Position	Country	Athlete	Time
1.	France	Christine Arron	11.17
2.	United States	Torri Edwards	11.22
3.	United States	Carmelita Jeter	11.24
4.	Belgium	Kim Gevaert	11.26
5.	Bulgaria	Tezdzhan Naimova	11.30
6.	United States	Me'Lisa Barber	11.32
7.	United States	Lauryn Williams	11.34
8.	Great Britain	Laura Turner	11.59
9.	Russia	Yevgeniya Polyakova	11.64

=== Women's 400 m ===
Position	Country	Athlete	Time
1.	United States	Sanya Richards	49.77
2.	Jamaica	Novlene Williams	50.15
3.	Senegal	Amy Mbacke Thiam	50.34
4.	Great Britain	Christine Ohuruogu	50.39
5.	Belarus	Ilona Usovich	51.05
6.	United States	Mary Wineberg	51.10
7.	Russia	Natalya Antyukh	51.20
8.	Ireland	Joanne Cuddihy	51.75

=== Women's 100 m Hurdles ===
Position	Country	Athlete	Time
1.	Sweden	Susanna Kallur	12.66
2.	Jamaica	Delloreen Ennis-London	12.68
3.	United States	Michelle Perry	12.68
4.	Canada	Perdita Felicien	12.71
5.	United States	Lolo Jones	12.81
6.	Australia	Sally McLellan	12.86
7.	Canada	Angela Whyte	12.89
8.	Spain	Josephine Onyia	12.96
9.	Jamaica	Vonette Dixon	12.98

=== Women's High Jump ===
Position	Country	Athlete	Height
1.	Croatia	Blanka Vlašić	2.04
2.	Russia	Yelena Slesarenko	2.01
3.	Russia	Yekaterina Savchenko	1.98
4.	Spain	Ruth Beitia	1.90
4.	Sweden	Kajsa Bergqvist	1.90
4.	Russia	Anna Chicherova	1.90
4.	Italy	Antonietta Di Martino	1.90
4.	Ukraine	Vita Palamar	1.90
9.	Sweden	Emma Green	1.90

=== Women's Pole Vault ===
Position	Country	Athlete	Height
1	Russia	Yelena Isinbayeva	4.80
2	Russia	Svetlana Feofanova	4.75
3	Russia	Yuliya Golubchikova	4.65
3	Poland	Monika Pyrek	4.65
5	Russia	Tatyana Polnova	4.65
6	Czech Republic	Kateřina Baďurová	4.55
7	Brazil	Fabiana Murer	4.55
8	France	Vanessa Boslak	4.40

=== Jackpot Contenders ===
==== Women ====
400 m: Sanya Richards (United States), Pole Vault: Yelena Isinbayeva (Russia)

== Memorial Van Damme ==
The 31st edition of the Memorial Van Damme took place at the King Baudouin Stadium, in Brussels, Belgium, on 14 September 2007.

The Golden League events were somewhat overshadowed in Brussels, as Meseret Defar succeeded in her world record attempt in the two miles event and Kenenisa Bekele failed in his attempt over 10,000 m.

=== Men's 100 m ===
Wind: -0.3

Position	Athlete	Country	Time
1	Asafa Powell	Jamaica	9.84
2	Jaysuma Saidy Ndure	Norway	10.11
3	Michael Frater	Jamaica	10.12
4	Marlon Devonish	United Kingdom	10.16
5	Marc Burns	Trinidad and Tobago	10.18
6	Francis Obikwelu	Portugal	10.25
7	Olusoji Fasuba	Nigeria	10.29
8	Darvis Patton	United States	10.30
9	LeRoy Dixon	United States	10.32

=== Men's 200 m ===
Wind: +0.7

Position	Athlete	Country	Time
1	Wallace Spearmon	United States	19.88
2	Xavier Carter	United States	20.04
3	Usain Bolt	Jamaica	20.14
4	Rodney Martin	United States	20.39
5	Johan Wissman	Sweden	20.49
6	Joshua J. Johnson	United States	20.54
7	Paul Hession	Ireland	20.79
8	Guus Hoogmoed	Netherlands	20.85
9	Kristof Beyens	Belgium	20.94

=== Men's 800 m ===
Position	Athlete	Country	Time
1	David Rudisha	Kenya	1:44.15
2	Mbulaeni Mulaudzi	South Africa	1:44.40
3	Yusuf Saad Kamel	Bahrain	1:44.43
4	Belal Mansoor Ali	Bahrain	1:44.89
5	Mohammed Al-Salhi	Saudi Arabia	1:45.30
6	Yuriy Borzakovskiy	Russia	1:45.46
7	Alfred Kirwa Yego	Kenya	1:45.83
8	Thomas Matthys	Belgium	1:47.30
9	Arnoud Okken	Netherlands	1:47.77

=== Men's 1500 m ===
Position	Athlete	Country	Time
1	Daniel Kipchirchir Komen	Kenya	3:32.67
2	Mohamed Moustaoui	Morocco	3:34.38
3	Juan Carlos Higuero	Spain	3:34.72
4	Geoffrey Kipkoech Rono	Kenya	3:35.72
5	Andrew Baddeley	United Kingdom	3:35.94
6	Rashid Ramzi	Bahrain	3:36.20
7	Shedrack Kibet Korir	Kenya	3:36.45
8	Arturo Casado	Spain	3:36.68
9	Elkanah Onkware Angwenyi	Kenya	3:37.23
10	Jon Rankin	United States	3:37.68
11	Suleiman Kipses Simotwo	Kenya	3:38.20
12	Hassan Mourhit	Belgium	3:43.28
13	Asbel Kiprop	Kenya	3:43.98
14	Nicholas Kemboi	Kenya	3:44.17
15	Joeri Jansen	Belgium	3:47.39
-	Timothy Kiptanui	Kenya	DNF
-	John Litei	Kenya	DNF
-	Samson Surum	Kenya	DNF

=== Men's 5,000 m ===
Position	Athlete	Country	Time
1	Sileshi Sihine	Ethiopia	12:50.16
2	Eliud Kipchoge	Kenya	12:50.38
3	Moses Ndiema Kipsiro	Uganda	12:50.72
4	Joseph Ebuya	Kenya	12:51.00
5	Thomas Pkemei Longosiwa	Kenya	12:51.95
6	Yusuf Kibet Biwott	Kenya	12:58.49
7	Abraham Chebii	Kenya	12:59.63
8	Tariku Bekele	Ethiopia	13:01.60
9	Sahle Warga	Ethiopia	13:06.51
10	Mo Farah	United Kingdom	13:07.00
11	Matthew Tegenkamp	United States	13:07.41
12	Leonard Patrick Komon	Kenya	13:08.87
13	Markos Geneti	Ethiopia	13:13.50
14	Kidane Tadese	Eritrea	13:31.69
-	Jonas Cheruiyot	Kenya	DNF
-	Shadrack Kosgei	Kenya	DNF
-	Collins Kosgei	Kenya	DNF
-	Monder Rizki	Belgium	DNF

=== Men's 10,000 m ===
Kenenisa Bekele, the current world record holder, won but failed to make a new world record in this event.

Position	Athlete	Country	Time
1	Kenenisa Bekele	Ethiopia	26:46.19
2	Moses Ndiema Masai	Kenya	26:49.20
3	Micah Kogo	Kenya	26:58.42
4	Bernard Kiprop Kipyego	Kenya	26:59.61
5	Robert Kipngetich	Kenya	27:16.48
6	Dieudonné Disi	Rwanda	27:22.28
7	John Cheruiyot Korir	Kenya	27:26.31
8	Gebregziabher Gebremariam	Ethiopia	27:39.61
9	Habtamu Fikadu	Ethiopia	27:40.64
10	Mebrahtom Keflezighi	United States	27:41.26
11	Reid Coolsaet	Canada	28:14.29
12	Joseph Kiptoo Birech	Kenya	28:28.09
13	Stanley Muiriri Nganga	Kenya	28:37.32
-	Abreham Cherkos	Ethiopia	DNF
-	Bekana Daba	Ethiopia	DNF
-	Hailu Dinku	Ethiopia	DNF
-	Benson Marrianyi Esho	Kenya	DNF
-	Joseph Kosgei	Kenya	DNF
-	Ahmed Baday	Morocco	DNS
-	Leonard Mucheru Maina	Kenya	DNS
-	Cuthbert Nyasango	Zimbabwe	DNS

=== Men's 3,000 m Steeplechase ===
Koech won with a new world lead for this year, and an improvement of 0.62 seconds to the previous lead, that marked in Stockholm in August.

Position	Athlete	Country	Time
1	Paul Kipsiele Koech	Kenya	7:58.80
2	Brimin Kiprop Kipruto	Kenya	8:02.89
3	Willy Rutto Komen	Kenya	8:11.18
4	Bouabdellah Tahri	France	8:11.77
5	Steve Slattery	United States	8:15.69
6	James Kosgei Cheptuiyon	Kenya	8:19.14
7	Julius Nyamu	Kenya	8:23.59
8	Günther Weidlinger	Austria	8:25.87
9	Roba Gary	Ethiopia	8:27.68
10	Brahim Taleb	Morocco	8:28.88
11	Hamid Ezzine	Morocco	8:34.47
12	Ezekiel Kemboi	Kenya	8:36.11
-	Boštjan Buc	Slovenia	DNF
-	Pieter Desmet	Belgium	DNF
-	Simon Vroemen	Netherlands	DNF
-	Tareq Mubarak Taher	Bahrain	DNS

=== Men's 110 m Hurdles ===
Wind: -0.5

Position	Athlete	Country	Time
1	Dayron Robles	Cuba	13.21
2	Anwar Moore	United States	13.25
3	Allen Johnson	United States	13.27
4	Ryan Wilson	United States	13.32
5	Ladji Doucouré	France	13.42
6	David Payne	United States	13.42
7	Andrew Turner	United Kingdom	13.55
8	Jackson Quiñónez	Spain	13.59
9	Maurice Wignall	Jamaica	13.63

=== Men's Triple Jump ===
Position	Athlete	Country	Distance
1	Walter Davis	United States	17.27
2	Aarik Wilson	United States	17.20
3	Nelson Évora	Portugal	17.14
4	Jadel Gregório	Brazil	16.82
5	Aleksandr Petrenko	Russia	16.59
6	Dmitrij Valukevic	Slovakia	16.53
7	Fabrizio Donato	Italy	16.51
8	Alexander Martínez	Switzerland	16.28
9	Julien Kapek	France	16.27
-	Leevan Sands	Bahamas	NM

=== Men's Javelin Throw ===
Position	Athlete	Country	Distance
1	Tero Pitkämäki	Finland	87.30
2	Andreas Thorkildsen	Norway	86.14
3	Magnus Arvidsson	Sweden	83.09
4	Tero Järvenpää	Finland	80.82
5	Aleksandr Ivanov	Russia	79.49
6	Guillermo Martínez	Cuba	78.96
7	Igor Janik	Poland	78.93
8	Ēriks Rags	Latvia	73.99
9	Tom Goyvaerts	Belgium	72.15

=== Women's 100 m ===
Wind: ±0.0

Position	Athlete	Country	Time
1	Veronica Campbell	Jamaica	11.11
2	Christine Arron	France	11.22
3	Torri Edwards	United States	11.22
4	Carmelita Jeter	United States	11.27
5	Aleen Bailey	Jamaica	11.30
6	Mikele Barber	United States	11.30
7	Lauryn Williams	United States	11.34
8	Tezzhan Naimova	Bulgaria	11.37
9	Sheri-Ann Brooks	Jamaica	11.45

=== Women's 200 m ===
Wind: +0.5

Position	Athlete	Country	Time
1	Kim Gevaert	Belgium	22.75
2	Torri Edwards	United States	22.81
3	Sherry Fletcher	Grenada	23.08
4	LaShauntea Moore	United States	23.13
5	Muriel Hurtis-Houairi	France	23.29
6	Debbie Ferguson-McKenzie	Bahamas	23.34
7	Hanna Mariën	Belgium	23.56
8	Cydonie Mothersille	Cayman Islands	23.57
9	Olivia Borlée	Belgium	24.01

=== Women's 400 m ===
Position	Athlete	Country	Time
1	Sanya Richards	United States	49.29
2	Nicola Sanders	United Kingdom	50.34
3	Novlene Williams	Jamaica	50.66
4	Mary Wineberg	United States	50.76
5	Shericka Williams	Jamaica	51.06
6	Amy Mbacke Thiam	Senegal	51.21
7	Ilona Usovich	Belarus	51.23
8	Shereefa Lloyd	Jamaica	51.85
9	Natalya Antyukh	Russia	52.70

=== Women's One Mile ===
Position	Athlete	Country	Time
1	Maryam Yusuf Jamal	Bahrain	4:17.75
2	Yelena Soboleva	Russia	4:21.16
3	Olga Yegorova	Russia	4:24.24
4	Yuliya Fomenko	Russia	4:24.79
5	Agnes Samaria	Namibia	4:25.01
6	Btissam Lakhouad	Morocco	4:25.35
7	Sarah Jamieson	Australia	4:25.95
8	Carmen Douma-Hussar	Canada	4:26.76
9	Erin Donohue	United States	4:27.35
10	Charlene Thomas	United Kingdom	4:27.95
11	Stephanie Twell	United Kingdom	4:28.16
12	Hilary Stellingwerff	Canada	4:28.62
-	Natalya Panteleyeva	Russia	DNF

=== Women's 3,000 m ===
Position	Athlete	Country	Time
1	Meseret Defar	Ethiopia	8:24.51
2	Priscah Jepleting Cherono	Kenya	8:37.92
3	Viola Kibiwot	Kenya	8:43.05
4	Sylvia Jebiwott Kibet	Kenya	8:43.09
5	Jessica Augusto	Portugal	8:44.68
6	Helen Clitheroe	United Kingdom	9:02.14
7	Veerle Dejaeghere	Belgium	9:09.58
8	Mimi Belete	Ethiopia	9:24.53
9	Bizunesh Urgesa	Ethiopia	9:26.50
10	Mahlet Melese	Ethiopia	9:33.55
-	Olga Komyagina	Russia	DNF

=== Women's Two Miles ===
After her 5,000 m event gold medal at the world champs this year, Defar successes to make a new world record in this event - with an improvement of 11.89 seconds to the previous record.

Position	Athlete	Country	Time
1	Meseret Defar	Ethiopia	8:58.58 WR
2	Priscah Jepleting Cherono	Kenya	9:14.09
3	Sylvia Jebiwott Kibet	Kenya	9:16.62
4	Viola Kibiwot	Kenya	9:18.26
5	Jessica Augusto	Portugal	9:22.89
6	Helen Clitheroe	United Kingdom	9:38.39
7	Veerle Dejaeghere	Belgium	9:49.93
8	Mimi Belete	Ethiopia	10:06.60
9	Bizunesh Urgesa	Ethiopia	10:08.10
10	Mahlet Melese	Ethiopia	10:15.25
-	Olga Komyagina	Russia	DNF

=== Women's 100 m Hurdles ===
Wind: +0.5

Position	Athlete	Country	Time
1	Susanna Kallur	Sweden	12.52
2	Delloreen Ennis-London	Jamaica	12.61
3	Michelle Perry	United States	12.61
4	Angela Whyte	Canada	12.69
5	LoLo Jones	United States	12.70
6	Sally McLellan	Australia	13.00
7	Josephine Onyia	Spain	13.08
8	Eline Berings	Belgium	13.25
9	Perdita Felicien	Canada	13.43

=== Women's High Jump ===
Position	Athlete	Country	Mark
1	Blanka Vlašić	Croatia	2.03
2	Yelena Slesarenko	Russia	2.01
3	Vita Palamar	Ukraine	1.99
4	Yekaterina Savchenko	Russia	1.99
5	Ruth Beitia	Spain	1.93
6	Anna Chicherova	Russia	1.90
7	Amy Acuff	United States	1.90
8	Melanie Skotnik	France	1.85
9	Emma Green	Sweden	1.85

=== Women's Pole Vault ===
Position	Athlete	Country	Mark
1	Yelena Isinbaeva	Russia	4.80
2	Svetlana Feofanova	Russia	4.80
3	Kateřina Baďurová	Czech Republic	4.65
4	Monika Pyrek	Poland	4.55
4	Silke Spiegelburg	Germany	4.55
6	Fabiana Murer	Brazil	4.40
6	Tatyana Polnova	Russia	4.40
8	Yuliya Golubchikova	Russia	4.40

=== Jackpot Contenders ===
==== Women ====
400 m: Sanya Richards (United States), Pole Vault: Yelena Isinbayeva (Russia)

== ISTAF ==
The 15th edition of the Internationales Stadionfest (ISTAF) took place at the Berlin Olympiastadion, in Berlin, Germany, on 16 September 2007.

The sixth Golden League meet ended with two jackpot winners: Sanya Richards from United States, in the women's 400m event, and Yelena Isinbayeva from Russia, in the women's Pole Vault event.

=== Men's 100 m ===
Wind: -0.5

Position	Athlete	Country	Time
1	Jaysuma Saidy Ndure	Norway	10.14
2	Marlon Devonish	United Kingdom	10.15
3	Rikki Fifton	United Kingdom	10.17
4	Michael Frater	Jamaica	10.23
5	Francis Obikwelu	Portugal	10.25
6	Marc Burns	Trinidad and Tobago	10.25
7	Joshua J. Johnson	United States	10.37
8	Leroy Dixon	United States	10.37
9	Mark Lewis-Francis	United Kingdom	10.45

=== Men's 200 m ===
Wind: -0.8

Position	Athlete	Country	Time
1	Wallace Spearmon	United States	20.22
2	Rodney Martin	United States	20.54
3	Marvin Anderson	Jamaica	20.61
4	Daniel Schnelting	Germany	20.78
5	Paul Hession	Ireland	20.79
6	Guus Hoogmoed	Netherlands	20.94
7	Till Helmke	Germany	21.08
8	Alexander Kosenkow	Germany	21.23

=== Men's 400 m ===
Position	Athlete	Country	Time
1	Jeremy Wariner	United States	44.05
2	Tyler Christopher	Canada	45.10
3	Angelo Taylor	United States	45.21
4	Darold Williamson	United States	45.38
5	Johan Wissman	Sweden	45.41
6	Leslie Djhone	France	45.56
7	Bastian Swillims	Germany	46.54
8	Ingo Schultz	Germany	46.58

=== Men's 1500 m ===
Position	Athlete	Country	Time
1	Daniel Kipchirchir Komen	Kenya	3:34.09
2	Bernard Lagat	United States	3:34.79
3	Shedrack Kibet Korir	Kenya	3:35.55
4	Suleiman Kipses Simotwo	Kenya	3:35.73
5	Geoffrey Kipkoech Rono	Kenya	3:37.12
6	Nicholas Kemboi	Kenya	3:37.80
7	Wolfram Müller	Germany	3:37.91
8	Bernard Kiptanui Kiptum	Kenya	3:38.31
9	Carsten Schlangen	Germany	3:38.34
10	Yusuf Kibet Biwott	Kenya	3:38.38
11	Kevin Sullivan	Canada	3:38.75
12	Mbulaeni Mulaudzi	South Africa	3:40.82
13	Craig Mottram	Australia	3:40.93
14	Diego Ruiz	Spain	3:41.19
-	Youcef Abdi	Australia	DNF
-	Youssef Baba	Morocco	DNF
-	Christopher Lukezic	United States	DNF
-	Samson Surum	Kenya	DNF

=== Men's 110 m Hurdles ===
Wind: -0.5

Position	Athlete	Country	Time
1	Allen Johnson	United States	13.33
2	Sergiy Demidyuk	Ukraine	13.38
3	Ryan Wilson	United States	13.40
4	Anwar Moore	United States	13.46
5	David Payne	United States	13.49
6	Maurice Wignall	Jamaica	13.55
7	Jackson Quiñónez	Spain	13.60
8	Joel Brown	United States	13.62
9	Thomas Blaschek	Germany	13.64

=== Men's 400 m Hurdles ===
Position	Athlete	Country	Time
1	Marek Plawgo	Poland	49.01
2	James Carter	United States	49.02
3	Kenneth Ferguson	United States	49.05
4	Félix Sánchez	Dominican Republic	49.93
5	L.J. van Zyl	South Africa	50.24
6	Ibrahim Maïga	Mali	51.36
7	Michael Tinsley	United States	52.35
-	Gianni Carabelli	Italy	DNF

=== Men's Pole Vault ===
Position	Athlete	Country	Mark
1	Danny Ecker	Germany	5.86
2	Björn Otto	Germany	5.81
3	Brad Walker	United States	5.81
4	Alexander Straub	Germany	5.71
5	Jeff Hartwig	United States	5.61
6	Yevgeniy Lukyanenko	Russia	5.51
6	Igor Pavlov	Russia	5.51
8	Fábio Gomes da Silva	Brazil	5.51
9	Tim Lobinger	Germany	5.51
-	Steven Hooker	Australia	NM

=== Men's Triple Jump ===
Position	Athlete	Country	Distance
1	Aarik Wilson	United States	17.07
2	Nelson Évora	Portugal	17.07
3	Jadel Gregório	Brazil	16.99
4	Walter Davis	United States	16.84
5	Leevan Sands	Bahamas	16.82
6	Randy Lewis	Grenada	16.77
7	Aleksandr Petrenko	Russia	16.45
8	Dmitrij Valukevic	Slovakia	15.91
9	Alexander Martínez	Switzerland	15.86
10	Fabrizio Donato	Italy	15.69
11	Anton Andersson	Sweden	15.48
12	Olaf Pusch	Germany	14.93

=== Men's Javelin Throw ===
Position	Athlete	Country	Distance
1	Tero Pitkämäki	Finland	88.58
2	Magnus Arvidsson	Sweden	84.50
3	Teemu Wirkkala	Finland	82.54
4	Andreas Thorkildsen	Norway	80.71
5	Igor Janik	Poland	79.17
6	Tero Järvenpää	Finland	78.15
7	Peter Esenwein	Germany	76.85
8	Aleksandr Ivanov	Russia	75.93
9	Guillermo Martínez	Cuba	74.34

=== Women's 100 m ===
Wind: -0.3 m/s

Position	Country	Athlete	Time
1	United States	Carmelita Jeter	11.15
2	United States	Lauryn Williams	11.24
3	France	Christine Arron	11.24
4	United States	Mikele Barber	11.30
5	Jamaica	Sheri-Ann Brooks	11.33
6	Bahamas	Chandra Sturrup	11.40
7	Bulgaria	Tezzhan Naimova	11.43
8	United Kingdom	Montell Douglas	11.45
9	Germany	Verena Sailer	11.52

=== Women's 200 m ===
The American female sprinter Lauryn Williams won this event with a time of 22.95.

Wind: -0.3 m/s

Position	Country	Athlete	Time
1	United States	Lauryn Williams	22.95
2	Bahamas	Debbie Ferguson-McKenzie	23.07
3	Jamaica	Aleen Bailey	23.08
4	United States	LaShauntea Moore	23.10
5	Cayman Islands	Cydonie Mothersille	23.10
6	France	Muriel Hurtis-Houairi	23.13
7	United States	Stephanie Durst	23.15
8	Germany	Cathleen Tschirch	23.45

=== Women's 400 m ===
Position	Athlete	Country	Time
1	Sanya Richards	United States	49.27
2	Christine Ohuruogu	United Kingdom	50.40
3	Nicola Sanders	United Kingdom	50.70
4	Amy Mbacke Thiam	Senegal	50.75
5	Novlene Williams	Jamaica	51.36
6	Ilona Usovich	Belarus	51.63
7	Natalya Antyukh	Russia	51.71
8	Jana Rawlinson	Australia	52.49

=== Women's 800 m ===
Position	Athlete	Country	Time
1	Janeth Jepkosgei	Kenya	1:58.62
2	Mayte Martínez	Spain	1:59.83
3	Yelena Soboleva	Russia	2:00.20
4	Sviatlana Usovich	Belarus	2:00.28
5	Brigita Langerholc	Slovenia	2:01.01
6	Svetlana Cherkasova	Russia	2:01.34
7	Svetlana Klyuka	Russia	2:02.25
8	Natallia Kareiva	Belarus	2:02.42
-	Elisa Cusma Piccione	Italy	DNF
-	Faith Macharia	Kenya	DNF

=== Women's 5,000 m ===
Position	Athlete	Country	Time
1	Vivian Cheruiyot	Kenya	14:50.78
2	Meselech Melkamu	Ethiopia	14:53.89
3	Kara Goucher	United States	14:55.02
4	Kimberley Smith	New Zealand	14:58.90
5	Linet Chepkwemoi Masai	Kenya	15:00.67
6	Silvia Weissteiner	Italy	15:02.65
7	Jennifer Rhines	United States	15:16.43
8	Beylanesh Fekadu	Ethiopia	15:18.36
9	Irene Kwambai Kipchumba	Kenya	15:18.70
10	Veronica Nyaruai Wanjiru	Kenya	15:23.37
11	Ruth Bisibori Nyangau	Kenya	15:26.65
12	Kseniya Agafonova	Russia	15:44.25
13	Zakia Mrisho Mohamed	Tanzania	16:17.32
-	Olga Komyagina	Russia	DNF
-	Regina Rakhimkulova	Russia	DNF

=== Women's 100 m Hurdles ===
The Sweden female athlete Susanna Kallur beat the American world champion Michelle Perry with a time of 12.49, very close to Perry's world lead for this year, 12.44.

- Wind: +0.9m/s

Position	Country	Athlete	Time
1	Sweden	Susanna Kallur	12.49
2	United States	Michelle Perry	12.67
3	Jamaica	Delloreen Ennis-London	12.69
4	Australia	Sally McLellan	12.74
5	Canada	Angela Whyte	12.75
6	Spain	Josephine Onyia	12.76
7	United States	LoLo Jones	12.78
8	Jamaica	Vonette Dixon	12.85
9	Canada	Perdita Felicien	12.89

=== Women's High Jump ===
Blanka Vlašić, the Croatian world champion for this event this year, won the event with a good high of 2.00 m.

Position	Country	Athlete	Height
1	Croatia	Blanka Vlašić	2.00
2	Russia	Yekaterina Savchenko	1.97
2	Russia	Yelena Slesarenko	1.97
4	Spain	Ruth Beitia	1.94
5	Russia	Anna Chicherova	1.94
5	Ukraine	Vita Palamar	1.94
7	Germany	Ariane Friedrich	1.90
8	Kazakhstan	Marina Aitova	1.85
8	Sweden	Emma Green	1.85
10	United States	Amy Acuff	1.85
-	Canada	Nicole Forrester	NM

=== Women's Pole Vault ===
Olympic, World, and European Champion, Yelena Isinbayeva, completed her 6 wins in 2007 Golden League in this meet.

Position	Country	Athlete	Height
1	Russia	Yelena Isinbayeva	4.82
2	Poland	Monika Pyrek	4.72
3	Russia	Svetlana Feofanova	4.72
4	France	Vanessa Boslak	4.62
5	Czech Republic	Kateřina Baďurová	4.52
6	Germany	Silke Spiegelburg	4.52
7	Russia	Yuliya Golubchikova	4.42
7	Brazil	Fabiana Murer	4.42

=== Women's Javelin Throw ===
Position	Athlete	Country	Distance
1	Christina Obergföll	Germany	64.58
2	Barbora Špotáková	Czech Republic	64.51
3	Steffi Nerius	Germany	64.49
4	Mariya Abakumova	Russia	60.40
5	Sávva Líka	Greece	60.40
6	Sonia Bisset	Cuba	60.03
7	Barbara Madejczyk	Poland	59.36
8	Nikola Brejchová	Czech Republic	59.17
9	Linda Stahl	Germany	57.72
10	Lada Chernova	Russia	56.06

== Jackpot Winners ==
Yelena Isinbaeva from Russia, in the women's Pole Vault event; and Sanya Richards from United States, in the women's 400 m event. Each of them got a prize of $500,000.
