= 2011 Doha Diamond League =

- Dates: 6 May 2011
- Host city: Doha, Qatar
- Venue: Suheim bin Hamad Stadium
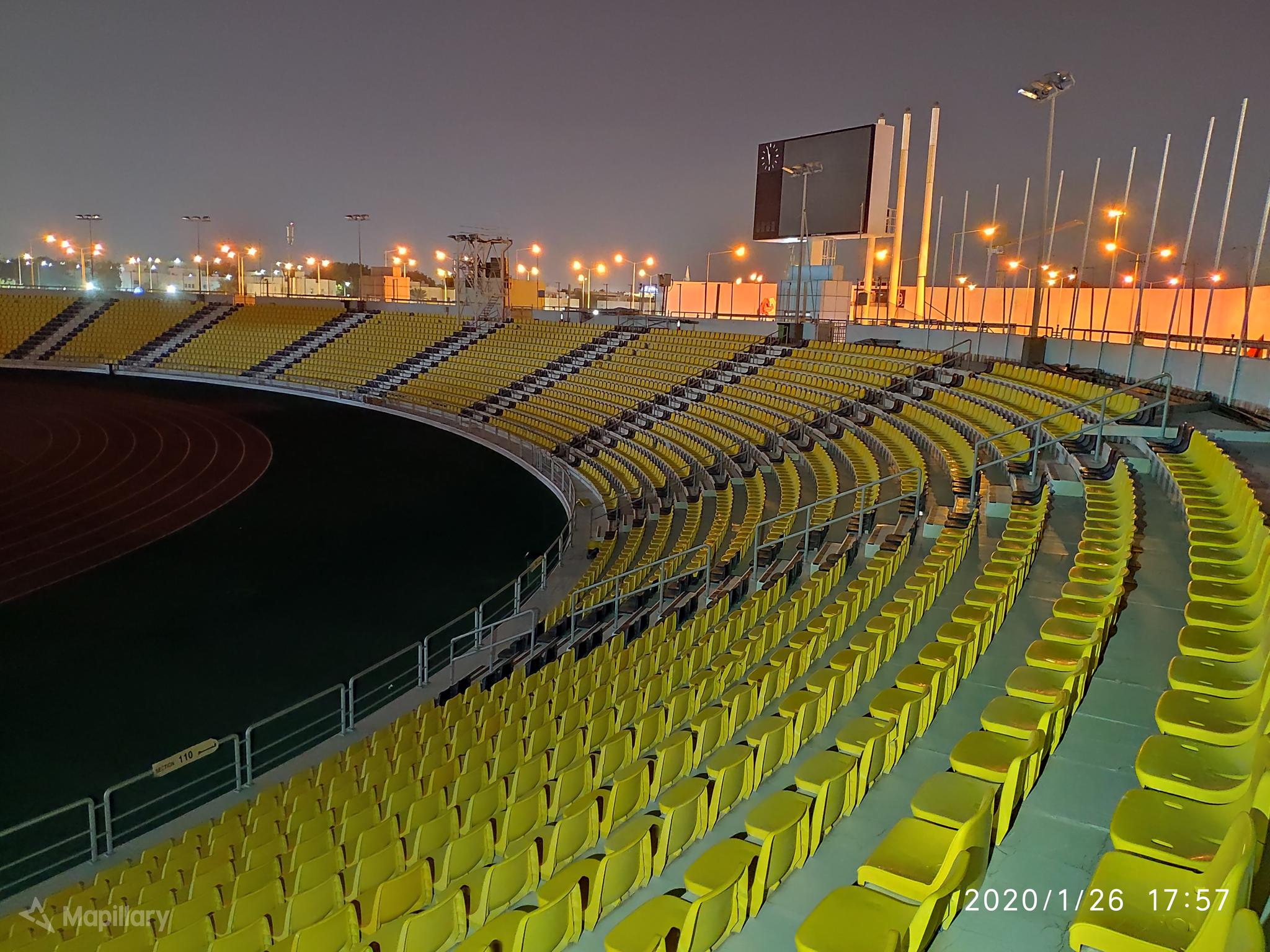
- Level: 2011 Diamond League

The 2011 Doha Diamond League was the 13th edition of the annual outdoor track and field meeting in Doha, Qatar. Held on 6 May at Suheim bin Hamad Stadium, it was the opening leg of the 2011 Diamond League – the highest level international track and field circuit.

== Diamond discipline results ==
Podium finishers earned points towards a season leaderboard (4-2-1 respectively), points per event were then doubled in the Diamond League Finals. Athletes had to take part in the Diamond race during the finals to be eligible to win the Diamond trophy which is awarded to the athlete with the most points at the end of the season.

=== Men's ===
200 Metres
Rank	Athlete	Nation	Time	Points	Notes
1st place, gold medalist(s)	Walter Dix	United States	20.06	4	MR, WL
2nd place, silver medalist(s)	Femi Ogunode	Qatar	20.30	2	NR
3rd place, bronze medalist(s)	Jaysuma Saidy Ndure	Norway	20.55	1	
4	Jordan Boase	United States	20.60		
5	Mario Forsythe	Jamaica	20.86		SB
6	Ainsley Waugh	Jamaica	20.90		
7	Omar Juma Al-Salfa	United Arab Emirates	21.32		
			Wind: (+0.5 m/s)		

800 Metres
Rank	Athlete	Nation	Time	Points	Notes
1st place, gold medalist(s)	Asbel Kiprop	Kenya	1:44.74	4	SB
2nd place, silver medalist(s)	Michael Rimmer	Great Britain	1:45.12	2	
3rd place, bronze medalist(s)	Alfred Kirwa Yego	Kenya	1:45.17	1	
4	Richard Kiplagat	Kenya	1:45.48		
5	Antonio Reina	Spain	1:45.55		
6	Marcin Lewandowski	Poland	1:46.42		
7	Hamza Driouch	Qatar	1:50.25		
—	Sammy Tangui	Kenya	DNF		

3000 Metres
Rank	Athlete	Nation	Time	Points	Notes
1st place, gold medalist(s)	Yenew Alamirew	Ethiopia	7:27.26	4	MR, WL
2nd place, silver medalist(s)	Edwin Soi	Kenya	7:27.55	2	PB
3rd place, bronze medalist(s)	Eliud Kipchoge	Kenya	7:27.66	1	PB
4	Augustine Kiprono Choge	Kenya	7:28.76		PB
5	Vincent Chepkok	Kenya	7:30.15		PB
6	Daniel Kipchirchir Komen	Kenya	7:31.41		PB
7	Moses Ndiema Kipsiro	Uganda	7:31.83		
8	Tariku Bekele	Ethiopia	7:33.50		
9	Thomas Longosiwa	Kenya	7:33.93		
10	Essa Ismail Rashed	Qatar	7:34.70		PB
11	Mark Kiptoo	Kenya	7:34.82		
12	John Kipkoech	Kenya	7:34.82		
13	Lucas Rotich	Kenya	7:35.57		PB
14	Yusuf Biwott	Kenya	7:36.84		
15	Hais Welday	Eritrea	7:37.23		
16	James Kwalia	Qatar	7:37.52		
17	Joseph Ebuya	Kenya	7:55.01		
—	Gideon Gathimba	Kenya	DNF		PM
—	Suleiman Simotwo	Kenya	DNF		PM

400 Metres hurdles
Rank	Athlete	Nation	Time	Points	Notes
1st place, gold medalist(s)	L. J. van Zyl	South Africa	48.11	4	MR
2nd place, silver medalist(s)	Cornel Fredericks	South Africa	48.43	2	
3rd place, bronze medalist(s)	Bershawn Jackson	United States	48.44	1	SB
4	Kurt Couto	Mozambique	50.03		SB
5	LaRon Bennett	United States	50.28		
6	Richard Yates	Great Britain	50.34		
7	Georg Fleischhauer	Germany	50.46		

High jump
Rank	Athlete	Nation	Height	Points	Notes
1st place, gold medalist(s)	Jesse Williams	United States	2.33 m	4	=MR
2nd place, silver medalist(s)	Kyriakos Ioannou	Cyprus	2.33 m	2	MR
3rd place, bronze medalist(s)	Mutaz Barsham	Qatar	2.31 m	1	NR
4	Donald Thomas	Bahamas	2.29 m		
5	Dusty Jonas	United States	2.29 m		
6	Aleksey Dmitrik	Russia	2.29 m		
7	Konstadinos Baniotis	Greece	2.26 m		
8	Tom Parsons	Great Britain	2.23 m		
9	Alessandro Talotti	Italy	2.23 m		
10	Rashid Al-Mannai	Qatar	2.20 m		SB
10	Wojciech Theiner	Poland	2.20 m		
10	Andra Manson	United States	2.20 m		

Pole vault
Rank	Athlete	Nation	Height	Points	Notes
1st place, gold medalist(s)	Malte Mohr	Germany	5.81 m	4	MR, WL
2nd place, silver medalist(s)	Maksym Mazuryk	Ukraine	5.70 m	2	
3rd place, bronze medalist(s)	Lázaro Borges	Cuba	5.60 m	1	=SB
4	Renaud Lavillenie	France	5.50 m		
5	Fabian Schulze	Germany	5.40 m		
5	Mateusz Didenkow	Poland	5.40 m		
5	Alhaji Jeng	Sweden	5.40 m		
5	Mark Hollis	United States	5.40 m		
9	Tim Lobinger	Germany	5.40 m		
—	Brad Walker	United States	NM		
—	Igor Pavlov	Russia	NM		

Triple jump
Rank	Athlete	Nation	Distance	Points	Notes
1st place, gold medalist(s)	Teddy Tamgho	France	17.49 m (+1.0 m/s)	4	MR, WL
2nd place, silver medalist(s)	Leevan Sands	Bahamas	17.09 m (+1.9 m/s)	2	SB
3rd place, bronze medalist(s)	Alexis Copello	Cuba	17.05 m (+1.0 m/s)	1	
4	Yoann Rapinier	France	16.21 m (+2.0 m/s)		
5	Sief El Islem Temacini	Algeria	16.03 m (+1.3 m/s)		PB
6	Mohamed Abbas Darwish	United Arab Emirates	15.90 m (+1.0 m/s)		
7	Randy Lewis	Grenada	15.83 m (+0.8 m/s)		

Shot put
Rank	Athlete	Nation	Distance	Points	Notes
1st place, gold medalist(s)	Dylan Armstrong	Canada	21.38 m	4	
2nd place, silver medalist(s)	Reese Hoffa	United States	21.27 m	2	
3rd place, bronze medalist(s)	Ryan Whiting	United States	21.23 m	1	SB
4	Māris Urtāns	Latvia	20.82 m		
5	Christian Cantwell	United States	20.79 m		
6	Tomasz Majewski	Poland	20.68 m		
7		Russia	20.17 m		SB
8	Pavel Lyzhyn	Belarus	20.11 m		
9		United States	17.62 m		

Discus throw
Rank	Athlete	Nation	Distance	Points	Notes
1st place, gold medalist(s)	Gerd Kanter	Estonia	67.49 m	4	WL
2nd place, silver medalist(s)	Virgilijus Alekna	Lithuania	65.92 m	2	
3rd place, bronze medalist(s)	Frank Casañas	Spain	64.22 m	1	SB
4	Ehsan Haddadi	Iran	64.16 m		
5	Piotr Małachowski	Poland	63.59 m		
6	Bogdan Pishchalnikov	Russia	61.08 m		
7	Jason Young	United States	60.45 m		
8	Zoltán Kővágó	Hungary	60.24 m		
9	Jarred Rome	United States	59.48 m		
10	Rashid Shafi Al-Dosari	Qatar	57.27 m		

Javelin throw
Rank	Athlete	Nation	Distance	Points	Notes
1st place, gold medalist(s)	Petr Frydrych	Czech Republic	85.32 m	4	
2nd place, silver medalist(s)	John Robert Oosthuizen	South Africa	84.38 m	2	SB
3rd place, bronze medalist(s)	Tero Pitkämäki	Finland	83.91 m	1	
4	Sergey Makarov	Russia	83.78 m		
5	Andreas Thorkildsen	Norway	83.63 m		
6	Vítězslav Veselý	Czech Republic	83.59 m		
7	Vadims Vasiļevskis	Latvia	82.65 m		
8	Matthias de Zordo	Germany	82.45 m		
9	Oleksandr Pyatnytsya	Ukraine	81.73 m		
10	Ilya Korotkov	Russia	74.44 m		

=== Women's ===
200 Metres
Rank	Athlete	Nation	Time	Points	Notes
1st place, gold medalist(s)	LaShauntea Moore	United States	22.83	4	
2nd place, silver medalist(s)	Charonda Williams	United States	22.95	2	
3rd place, bronze medalist(s)	Patricia Hall	Jamaica	23.16	1	PB
4	Blessing Okagbare	Nigeria	23.19		
5	Aleksandra Fedoriva	Russia	23.31		
6	Consuella Moore	United States	23.85		
7	Yelizaveta Demirova	Russia	23.98		
			Wind: (+0.3 m/s)		

400 Metres
Rank	Athlete	Nation	Time	Points	Notes
1st place, gold medalist(s)	Allyson Felix	United States	50.33	4	WL
2nd place, silver medalist(s)	Amantle Montsho	Botswana	50.41	2	
3rd place, bronze medalist(s)	Patricia Hall	Jamaica	51.74	1	SB
4	Muriel Hurtis-Houairi	France	52.30		
5	Davita Prendergast	Jamaica	52.43		SB
6	Monica Hargrove	United States	52.49		
7	Amy Mbacké Thiam	Senegal	52.82		
8	Floria Gueï	France	54.00		

1500 Metres
Rank	Athlete	Nation	Time	Points	Notes
1st place, gold medalist(s)	Anna Mishchenko	Ukraine	4:03.00	4	WL
2nd place, silver medalist(s)	Irene Jelagat	Kenya	4:04.89	2	
3rd place, bronze medalist(s)	Siham Hilali	Morocco	4:05.18	1	
4	Viola Kibiwot	Kenya	4:05.54		
5	Kalkidan Gezahegne	Ethiopia	4:06.52		
6	Btissam Lakhouad	Morocco	4:07.60		
7	Renata Pliś	Poland	4:09.51		
8	Malika Akkaoui	Morocco	4:09.88		PB
9	Malindi Elmore	Canada	4:11.79		
10	Eunice Sum	Kenya	4:12.41		PM
11	Tizita Bogale	Ethiopia	4:12.78		
12	Betlhem Desalegn	United Arab Emirates	4:18.67		NR
—	Tamara Tverdostup	Ukraine	DNF		PM

100 Metres hurdles
Rank	Athlete	Nation	Time	Points	Notes
1st place, gold medalist(s)	Kellie Wells	United States	12.58	4	WL
2nd place, silver medalist(s)	Danielle Carruthers	United States	12.64	2	
3rd place, bronze medalist(s)	Lolo Jones	United States	12.67	1	
4	Ginnie Crawford	United States	12.73		SB
5	Nichole Denby	United States	12.98		
6	Yvette Lewis	United States	13.07		SB
7	Celriece Law	United States	13.19		SB
8	Sandra Gomis	France	13.23		
			Wind: (+1.3 m/s)		

3000 Metres steeplechase
Rank	Athlete	Nation	Time	Points	Notes
1st place, gold medalist(s)	Milcah Chemos Cheywa	Kenya	9:16.44	4	MR, WL
2nd place, silver medalist(s)	Mercy Wanjiku	Kenya	9:16.94	2	PB
3rd place, bronze medalist(s)	Lydia Rotich	Kenya	9:19.20	1	
4	Sofia Assefa	Ethiopia	9:25.08		
5	Birtukan Fente	Ethiopia	9:38.29		PB
6	Mardrea Hyman	Jamaica	10:04.57		SB
7	Cristina Casandra	Romania	10:06.45		
—	Oxana Juravel	Moldova	DNF		PM

Long jump
Rank	Athlete	Nation	Distance	Points	Notes
1st place, gold medalist(s)	Funmi Jimoh	United States	6.88 m (+1.6 m/s)	4	WL
2nd place, silver medalist(s)	Maurren Maggi	Brazil	6.87 m (+1.5 m/s)	2	SB
3rd place, bronze medalist(s)	Anna Nazarova	Russia	6.77 m (+1.2 m/s)	1	
4	Tatyana Kotova	Russia	6.74 m (+2.0 m/s)		
5	Éloyse Lesueur-Aymonin	France	6.66 m (+1.3 m/s)		
6	Ivana Španović	Serbia	6.63 m (+2.2 m/s)		
7	Yuliya Pidluzhnaya	Russia	6.59 m (+0.8 m/s)		
8	Ineta Radēviča	Latvia	6.55 m (+2.5 m/s)		
9	Keila Costa	Brazil	6.36 m (+1.5 m/s)		
—	Yelena Sokolova	Russia	NM		
Best wind-legal performances
—	Ivana Španović	Serbia	6.62 m (+0.3 m/s)		
—	Ineta Radēviča	Latvia	6.53 m (+2.0 m/s)		

== Promotional events results ==
=== Men's ===
1500 Metres
Rank	Athlete	Nation	Time	Notes
1st place, gold medalist(s)	Nixon Chepseba	Kenya	3:31.84	WL
2nd place, silver medalist(s)	Silas Kiplagat	Kenya	3:32.15	
3rd place, bronze medalist(s)	Mekonnen Gebremedhin	Ethiopia	3:32.28	
4	Caleb Ndiku	Kenya	3:33.05	SB
5	Haron Keitany	Kenya	3:33.39	
6	Abdalaati Iguider	Morocco	3:33.50	
7	Remmy Limo Ndiwa	Kenya	3:33.65	
8	Ismael Kombich	Kenya	3:34.38	
9	Geoffrey Rono	Kenya	3:35.28	
10	Taoufik Makhloufi	Algeria	3:44.78	
—	Collins Cheboi	Kenya	DNF	
—	Vickson Naran Polonet	Kenya	DNF	

== See also ==
- 2011 Diamond League
