= 2007 in the sport of athletics =

2007 in athletics
- Major world events: World Championships
- IAAF Athletes of the Year: Tyson Gay; Meseret Defar

This article contains an overview of the sport of athletics, including track and field, cross country and road running, in the year 2007.

== Major events ==
=== World ===
- World Championships in Athletics
- World Athletics Final
- World Cross Country Championships
- World Road Running Championships
- World Youth Championships
- World Student Games
- Military World Games
- Golden League
- World Marathon Majors

=== Regional ===
- All-Africa Games
- African Junior Championships
- Asian Championships
- Asian Cross Country Championships
- Asian Indoor Games
- Pan Arab Games
- Southeast Asian Games
- NACAC Athletics Championships
- NACAC Cross Country Championships
- Pan American Games
- South American Athletics Championships
- South American Cross Country Championships
- European Cross Country Championships
- European Cup
- European Indoor Championships
- European Junior Championships
- European U23 Championships
- European Youth Olympic Festival
- European Mountain Running Championships

== World records ==
=== Men ===
EVENT	ATHLETE	MARK/DISTANCE	DATE	VENUE
Half marathon	Samuel Kamau Wanjiru (KEN)	58:53 (Note: Not ratified due to inadequate drug testing)	February 9	Ras al Khaimah, United Arab Emirates
2000 metres (indoor)	Kenenisa Bekele (ETH)	4:49.99	February 17	Birmingham, UK
20 kilometres (road)	Samuel Kamau Wanjiru (KEN)	55:31+ (Note: Not submitted for ratification as no official time taken)	March 17	The Hague, Netherlands
Half marathon	Samuel Kamau Wanjiru (KEN)	58:33	March 17	The Hague, Netherlands
20,000 m	Haile Gebrselassie (ETH)	56:26.0+	June 27	Ostrava, Czech Republic
Hour run	Haile Gebrselassie (ETH)	21.285 km	June 27	Ostrava, Czech Republic
100 metres	Asafa Powell (JAM)	9.74	September 9	Rieti, Italy
20 kilometres walking (road)	Vladimir Kanaykin (RUS)	1:17:16	September 29	Saransk, Russia
Marathon	Haile Gebrselassie (ETH)	2:04:26	September 30	Berlin, Germany

=== Women ===
EVENT	ATHLETE	MARK	DATE	VENUE
5000 m (indoor)	Tirunesh Dibaba (ETH)	14:27.42	January 27	Boston, Massachusetts, USA
3000 m (indoor)	Meseret Defar (ETH)	8:23.72	February 3	Stuttgart, Germany
4 × 800 m relay (indoor)	Moscow Oblast (RUS); Anna Balakshina, Natalya Panteleyeva, Anna Yemashova, Olesya Chumakova	8:18.54	February 11	Volgograd, Russia
Pole vault (indoor)	Yelena Isinbayeva (RUS)	4.93 m	February 16	Donetsk, Ukraine
Two miles	Meseret Defar (ETH)	9:10.47 (Note: The 2 mile run is not an official event for record purposes, however, this is the best performance)	May 20	Carson, California, USA
5000 m	Meseret Defar (ETH)	14:16.63	June 15	Oslo, Norway
Two miles	Meseret Defar (ETH)	8:58.58	September 14	Brussels, Belgium
20 kilometres (road)	Lornah Kiplagat (NED)	1:02:57+	October 14	Udine, Italy
Half marathon	Lornah Kiplagat (NED)	1:06:25	October 14	Udine, Italy

== Awards ==
=== Men ===
2007 TRACK & FIELD AWARDS	WINNER
IAAF World Athlete of the Year	Tyson Gay (USA)
Track & Field Athlete of the Year	Tyson Gay (USA)
European Athlete of the Year Award	Tero Pitkämäki (FIN)
Best Male Track Athlete ESPY Award	Jeremy Wariner (USA)

=== Women ===
2007 TRACK & FIELD AWARDS	WINNER
IAAF World Athlete of the Year	Meseret Defar (ETH)
Track & Field Athlete of the Year	Meseret Defar (ETH)
European Athlete of the Year Award	Blanka Vlašić (CRO)
Best Female Track Athlete ESPY Award	Not Rewarded

== Men's Best Year Performers ==
=== 100 metres ===
RANK	2007 WORLD BEST PERFORMERS	TIME
1.	Asafa Powell (JAM)	9.74 WR
2.	Tyson Gay (USA)	9.84
3.	Derrick Atkins (BAH)	9.91
4.	Walter Dix (USA)	9.93
5.	Wallace Spearmon (USA)	9.96

=== 200 metres ===
RANK	2007 WORLD BEST PERFORMERS	TIME
1.	Tyson Gay (USA)	19.62
2.	Walter Dix (USA)	19.69
3.	Usain Bolt (JAM)	19.75
4.	Wallace Spearmon (USA)	19.82
5.	Jaysuma Saidy Ndure (NOR)	19.89

=== 400 metres ===
RANK	2007 WORLD BEST PERFORMERS	TIME
1.	Jeremy Wariner (USA)	43.45
2.	LaShawn Merritt (USA)	43.96
3.	Angelo Taylor (USA)	44.05
4.	Christopher Brown (BAH)	44.45
5.	Leslie Djhone (FRA)	44.46

=== 800 metres ===
RANK	2007 WORLD BEST PERFORMERS	TIME
1.	Mbulaeni Mulaudzi (RSA)	1:43.74
2.	Alan Webb (USA)	1:43.84
3.	Yusuf Saad Kamel (BHR)	1:43.87
4.	Abubaker Kaki Khamis (SUD)	1:43.90
5.	Amine Laâlou (MAR)	1:43.94

=== 1500 metres ===
RANK	2007 WORLD BEST PERFORMERS	TIME
1.	Alan Webb (USA)	3:30.54
2.	Tarek Boukensa (ALG)	3:30.92
3.	Mehdi Baala (FRA)	3:31.01
4.	Shedrack Kibet Korir (KEN)	3:31.18
5.	Belal Mansoor Ali (BHR)	3:31.49

=== 3000 metres ===
RANK	2007 WORLD BEST PERFORMERS	TIME
1.	Kenenisa Bekele (ETH)	7:25.79
2.	Moses Kipsiro (UGA)	7:32.03
3.	Alistair Cragg (IRL)	7:32.49
4.	Thomas Longosiwa (KEN)	7:32.79
5.	Eliud Kipchoge (KEN)	7:33.06

=== 5000 metres ===
RANK	2007 WORLD BEST PERFORMERS	TIME
1.	Kenenisa Bekele (ETH)	12:49.53
2.	Sileshi Sihine (ETH)	12:50.16
3.	Eliud Kipchoge (KEN)	12:50.38
4.	Moses Kipsiro (UGA)	12:50.72
5.	Joseph Ebuya (KEN)	12:51.00

=== 10,000 metres ===
RANK	2007 WORLD BEST PERFORMERS	TIME
1.	Kenenisa Bekele (ETH)	26:48.73
2.	Sileshi Sihine (ETH)	26:48.73
3.	Eliud Kipchoge (KEN)	26.49.02
4.	Moses Masai (KEN)	26:49.20
5.	Moses Mosop (KEN)	26:49.55

=== 110 metres hurdles ===
RANK	2007 WORLD BEST PERFORMERS	TIME
1.	Liu Xiang (CHN)	12.92
1.	Dayron Robles (CUB)	12.92
3.	Terrence Trammell (USA)	12.95
4.	Ryan Wilson (USA)	13.02
4.	David Payne (USA)	13.02

=== 400 metres hurdles ===
RANK	2007 WORLD BEST PERFORMERS	TIME
1.	Kerron Clement (USA)	47.61
2.	James Carter (USA)	47.72
3.	Félix Sánchez (DOM)	48.01
4.	Michael Tinsley (USA)	48.02
5.	Marek Plawgo (POL)	48.12

=== 3000 metres steeplechase ===
RANK	2007 WORLD BEST PERFORMERS	TIME
1.	Paul Kipsiele Koech (KEN)	7:58.80
2.	Brimin Kipruto (KEN)	8:02.89
3.	Ezekiel Kemboi (KEN)	8:05.50
4.	Mustafa Mohamed (SWE)	8:05.75
5.	Richard Mateelong (KEN)	8:06.66

=== Half Marathon ===
RANK	2007 WORLD BEST PERFORMERS	TIME
1.	Samuel Wanjiru (KEN)	58:35 WR
2.	Patrick Makau (KEN)	58:56
3.	Zersenay Tadese (ERI)	58:59
4.	Evans Cheruiyot (KEN)	59:05
5.	Deribe Mergia (ETH)	59:16

=== Marathon ===
RANK	2007 WORLD BEST PERFORMERS	TIME
1.	Haile Gebrselassie (ETH)	2:04:26 WR
2.	Emanuel Mutai (KEN)	2:06:28
3.	Samuel Wanjiru (KEN)	2:06:39
4.	Richard Limo (KEN)	2:06:44
5.	Deribe Mergia (ETH)	2:06:50

=== High jump ===
RANK	2007 WORLD BEST PERFORMERS	TIME
1.	Donald Thomas (BAH)	2.35
1.	Stefan Holm (SWE)	2.35
1.	Yaroslav Rybakov (RUS)	2.35
1.	Kyriacos Ioannou (CYP)	2.35
5.	Eike Onnen (GER)	2.34
5.	Andrey Tereshin (RUS)	2.34

=== Pole Vault ===
RANK	2007 WORLD BEST PERFORMERS	HEIGHT
1.	Brad Walker (USA)	5.95 m
2.	Steven Hooker (AUS)	5.91 m
2.	Paul Burgess (AUS)	5.91 m
4.	Björn Otto (GER)	5.90 m
5.	Danny Ecker (GER)	5.87 m

=== Long jump ===
RANK	2007 WORLD BEST PERFORMERS	Distance/m
1.	Louis Tsatoumas (GRE)	8.66
2.	Irving Saladino (PAN)	8.57
3.	Andrew Howe (ITA)	8.47
4.	James Beckford (JAM)	8.37
5.	Godfrey Khotso Mokoena (RSA)	8.34

=== Triple jump ===
RANK	2007 WORLD BEST PERFORMERS	Distance/m
1.	Jadel Gregório (BRA)	17.90
2.	Nelson Évora (POR)	17.74
3.	Aarik Wilson (USA)	17.58
4.	Christian Olsson (SWE)	17.56
5.	Osniel Tosca (CUB)	17.52

=== Shot put ===
RANK	2007 WORLD BEST PERFORMERS	Distance/m
1.	Reese Hoffa (USA)	22.43
2.	Christian Cantwell (USA)	21.96
3.	Joachim Olsen (DEN)	21.61
3.	Adam Nelson (USA)	21.61
5.	Andrey Mikhnevich (BLR)	21.27

=== Javelin throw ===
RANK	2007 WORLD BEST PERFORMERS	Distance/m
1.	Breaux Greer (USA)	91.29
2.	Tero Pitkämäki (FIN)	91.23
3.	Vadims Vasilevskis (LAT)	90.73
4.	Andreas Thorkildsen (NOR)	89.51
5.	Sergey Makarov (RUS)	87.46

=== Discus throw ===
RANK	2007 WORLD BEST PERFORMERS	Distance/m
1.	Gerd Kanter (EST)	72.02
2.	Virgilijus Alekna (LTU)	71.56
3.	Frantz Kruger (FIN)	69.97
4.	Jarred Rome (USA)	68.37
5.	Mario Pestano (ESP)	68.26

=== Hammer throw ===
RANK	2007 WORLD BEST PERFORMERS	Distance/m
1.	Ivan Tikhon (BLR)	83.63
2.	Vadim Devyatovskiy (BLR)	82.94
3.	Koji Murofushi (JPN)	82.62
4.	Primož Kozmus (SLO)	82.30
5.	Libor Charfreitag (SVK)	81.60

=== Decathlon ===
RANK	2007 WORLD BEST PERFORMERS	POINTS
1.	Roman Šebrle (CZE)	8697
2.	Maurice Smith (JAM)	8644
3.	Andrei Krauchanka (BLR)	8617
4.	Dmitriy Karpov (KAZ)	8586
5.	Bryan Clay (USA)	8493

== Women's Best Year Performers ==
=== 100 metres ===
RANK	2007 WORLD BEST PERFORMERS	TIME
1.	Veronica Campbell (JAM)	10.89
2.	Torri Edwards (USA)	10.90
3.	Me'Lisa Barber (USA)	10.95
4.	Sanya Richards (USA)	10.97
5.	Allyson Felix (USA)	11.01
5.	Lauryn Williams (USA)	11.01

=== 200 metres ===
RANK	2007 WORLD BEST PERFORMERS	TIME
1.	Allyson Felix (USA)	21.81
2.	Rachelle Smith (USA)	22.31
2.	Sanya Richards (USA)	22.31
4.	Ebonie Floyd (USA)	22.32
5.	Veronica Campbell (JAM)	22.34

=== 400 metres ===
RANK	2007 WORLD BEST PERFORMERS	TIME
1.	Sanya Richards (USA)	49.27
2.	Christine Ohuruogu (GBR)	49.61
3.	DeeDee Trotter (USA)	49.64
4.	Nicola Sanders (GBR)	49.65
5.	Novlene Williams (JAM)	49.66

=== 800 metres ===
RANK	2007 WORLD BEST PERFORMERS	TIME
1.	Janeth Jepkosgei (KEN)	1:56.04
2.	Hasna Benhassi (MAR)	1:56.84
3.	Maria de Lurdes Mutola (MOZ)	1:56.98
4.	Mayte Martínez (ESP)	1:57.62
5.	Yuliya Krevsun (UKR)	1:57.63

=== 1,500 metres ===
RANK	2007 WORLD BEST PERFORMERS	TIME
1.	Yelena Soboleva (RUS)	3:57.30
2.	Maryam Yusuf Jamal (BHR)	3:58.75
3.	Gelete Burka (ETH)	4:00.48
4.	Irina Lishchinskaya (UKR)	4:00.69
5.	Yuliya Fomenko (RUS)	4:00.7

=== Mile ===
RANK	2007 WORLD BEST PERFORMERS	TIME
1.	Yelena Soboleva (RUS)	4:15.63
2.	Maryam Yusuf Jamal (BHR)	4:17.75
3.	Olga Yegorova (RUS)	4:20.10
4.	Gulnara Samitova-Galkina (RUS)	4:20.23
5.	Anna Alminova (RUS)	4:20.86

=== Half Marathon ===
RANK	2007 WORLD BEST PERFORMERS	TIME
1.	Lornah Kiplagat (NED)	1:06:25 WR
2.	Mary Keitany (KEN)	1:06:48
3.	Kara Goucher (USA)	1:06:57
4.	Rita Cheptoo (KEN)	1:07:05
5.	Paula Radcliffe (GBR)	1:07:53

=== Marathon ===
RANK	2007 WORLD BEST PERFORMERS	TIME
1.	Zhou Chunxiu (CHN)	2:20:38
2.	Mizuki Noguchi (JPN)	2:21:37
3.	Getenesh Wami (ETH)	2:21:45
4.	Paula Radcliffe (GBR)	2:23:09
5.	Wei Yanan (CHN)	2:23:12

=== 100m Hurdles ===
RANK	2007 WORLD BEST PERFORMERS	TIME
1.	Michelle Perry (USA)	12.44
2.	Ginnie Powell (USA)	12.45
3.	Perdita Felicien (CAN)	12.49
3.	Susanna Kallur (SWE)	12.49
5.	Delloreen Ennis-London (JAM)	12.50

=== 400m Hurdles ===
RANK	2007 WORLD BEST PERFORMERS	TIME
1.	Tiffany Williams (USA)	53.28
2.	Sheena Johnson (USA)	53.29
3.	Jana Rawlinson (AUS)	53.31
4.	Yuliya Pechonkina (RUS)	53.50
5.	Anna Jesień (POL)	53.86

=== 3,000m Steeplechase ===
RANK	2007 WORLD BEST PERFORMERS	TIME
1.	Yekaterina Volkova (RUS)	9:06.57
2.	Tatyana Petrova (RUS)	9:09.19
3.	Gulnara Samitova-Galkina (RUS)	9:11.68
4.	Eunice Jepkorir (KEN)	9:14.52
5.	Ruth Bisibori (KEN)	9:24.51

=== High Jump ===
RANK	2007 WORLD BEST PERFORMERS	HEIGHT
1.	Blanka Vlašić (CRO)	2.07 m
2.	Antonietta Di Martino (ITA)	2.03 m
2.	Anna Chicherova (RUS)	2.03 m
4.	Kajsa Bergqvist (SWE)	2.02 m
4.	Yelena Slesarenko (RUS)	2.02 m
4.	Ruth Beitia (ESP)	2.02 m

=== Pole Vault ===
RANK	2007 WORLD BEST PERFORMERS	HEIGHT
1.	Yelena Isinbayeva (RUS)	4.91 m
2.	Jennifer Stuczynski (USA)	4.88 m
3.	Monika Pyrek (POL)	4.82 m
3.	Svetlana Feofanova (RUS)	4.82 m
5.	Katerina Badurová (CZE)	4.75 m

=== Heptathlon ===
RANK	2007 WORLD BEST PERFORMERS	POINTS
1.	Carolina Klüft (SWE)	7032
2.	Lyudmila Blonska (UKR)	6832
3.	Kelly Sotherton (GBR)	6510
4.	Jessica Ennis (GBR)	6469
5.	Lilli Schwarzkopf (GER)	6439

== Deaths ==
- January 21 — Maria Cioncan (29), Romanian runner (b. 1977)
- January 27 — Yang Chuan-kwang (73), Taiwanese decathlete (b. 1933)
- January 27 — Yelena Romanova (43), Russian runner (b. 1963)
- April 2 — Satymkul Dzhumanazarov (56), Kyrgyzstani long-distance runner (b. 1951)
- August 1 — Veikko Karvonen (81), Finnish long-distance runner (b. 1926)
- September 29 — Gyula Zsivótzky (70), Hungarian hammer thrower (b. 1937)
- October 1 — Al Oerter (71), American discus thrower (b. 1936)
- November 3 — Ryan Shay (28), American long-distances runner (b. 1979)
- November 13 — Robert Taylor (59), American sprinter (b. 1948)
- November 26 — Herb McKenley (85), Jamaican sprinter (b. 1922)
