= Melese (name) =

Melese is both a masculine given name and a surname that occur primarily in Ethiopia. Notable people with the name include:

== Given name ==
- Melese Feissa (born 1967), Ethiopian cross country runner
- Melese Nberet (born 2001), Ethiopian middle-distance runner

== Surname ==
- Mahlet Melese (born 1990), Ethiopian long-distance runner
- Yebrgual Melese (1990–2026), Ethiopian long-distance runner

== See also ==
- Gashaw Asfaw Melese (born 1978), Ethiopian long-distance runner
- Muluken Melesse (1954–2024), Ethiopian singer and drummer
