= Mahlet Melese =

Ethiopian long-distance runner

Mahlet Melese (born 20 May 1990) is an Ethiopian female long-distance runner. She was the 3000 metres silver medallist at the 2007 World Youth Championships in Athletics, where she ran a personal best of 8:56.98 minutes to place behind Mercy Cherono. She was the Ethiopian national champion at that distance that year at the age of seventeen.

Melese competed over two miles at the Memorial Van Damme in her 2007 IAAF Golden League debut, and placed tenth at the 2007 IAAF World Athletics Final. Following this she converted to road running and began entering European races in 2009. She came third at the Amatrice-Configno and fourth at the Corribianco. She took a break from competing and re-emerged in 2011 with a marathon debut in Toulouse, recording 2:44:43 hours for fifth place. She won the 2012 Luxembourg Marathon and was runner-up the following year. She ran a lifetime best of 2:37:23 hours at the 2013 Münster Marathon, but this was only enough for fourth. She travelled to the United States in 2014 and won 10K run and half marathon races in Atlantic City, as well as placing second at the Richmond Marathon.

== International competitions ==
Year	Competition	Venue	Position	Event	Notes
2007	World Youth Championships	Ostrava, Czech Republic	2nd	3000 m	8:56.98
2007	World Athletics Final	Stuttgart, Germany	10th	3000 m	9:25.74

== National titles ==
- Ethiopian Athletics Championships
  - 3000 m: 2007
