= Ryan Wilson (hurdler) =

American sprint hurdler (born 1980)

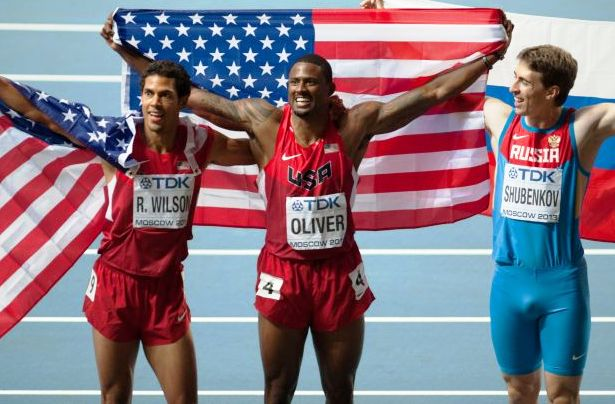
- Ryan Wilson (left) during 2013 World Championships in Athletics in Moscow.

Personal information
- Nationality: American
- Born: December 19, 1980 (age 45) Columbus, Ohio, U.S.
- Height: 6 ft 2 in (1.88 m)
- Weight: 175 lb (79 kg)

Sport
- Sport: Track and Field
- Event: 110 m hurdles
- College team: USC Trojans
Medal record
Men's athletics
Representing the United States
World Championships
Silver medal – second place	2013 Moscow	110 m hurdles
World Athletics Final
Bronze medal – third place	2008 Stuttgart	110 m hurdles

Ryan Wilson (born December 19, 1980) is an American track and field athlete who specializes in the 110 meters hurdles. He is a previous national champion after winning at the 2013 USA Outdoor Track and Field Championships, and the current national silver medal holder at the 2014 USA Outdoor Track and Field Championships. He was the 2003 NCAA champion in the event and won four hurdles titles in the Pacific-10 Conference. He was the bronze medalist at the 2008 IAAF World Athletics Final and was the runner-up at the 2010 USA Outdoor Track and Field Championships. His personal best time of 13.02 seconds, set in 2007 at the Reebok Grand Prix, ranks him within the top twenty fastest of all time in the event.

== Career ==
=== College ===
Born in Columbus, Ohio, he competed in a variety of sports while at The Columbus Academy and later at Westerville North High School. He earned Academic All-Ohio honours for his studies. He graduated in 1999, and moved on to attend the University of Southern California. Competing for the USC Trojans, he won the high hurdles competition in the Pacific-10 Conference on three occasions. He came third at the NCAA Men's Outdoor Track and Field Championship in his second year. In his final year of college athletics he won the NCAA title in the 110 m hurdles, as well as claiming both 110 and 400 meters hurdles titles in the Pac-10 outdoor competition.

=== Professional ===
After turning professional in 2004 he ran at the United States Olympic Trials but did not make it past the quarter-finals. After an uneventful 2005, he took third place at the 2006 USA Outdoor Track and Field Championships and improved his personal best to 13.22 seconds. He won the 110 m hurdles for the United States at that year's DecaNation event in France. He began 2007 with a win at the FBK Games and then set a career best at the Reebok Grand Prix in New York City, taking third behind Liu Xiang and Terrence Trammell in a time of 13.02 seconds. He was a regular fixture on the 2007 IAAF Golden League circuit and reached the top three at top European meets including Herculis, the British Grand Prix, ISTAF, and a win at the London Grand Prix.

Wilson reached the hurdles final at that year's national championships, but did not finish the race and missed a chance to compete at the 2007 World Championships in Athletics. Wilson ended the year as the fourth fastest hurdler of 2007.

He failed to follow up on his breakthrough year in 2008 as he was knocked out in the semi-final round of the Olympic Trials and ended the season with a best run of 13.28 seconds. He did manage to win the bronze medal at the 2008 IAAF World Athletics Final, coming behind fellow American David Oliver. He started 2009 by posting a fast early season time of 13.21 seconds at the 100th anniversary of the Drake Relays in April, setting a meet record in the process. He won at the Grande Premio Brasil Caixa de Atletismo in May and then came third at the FBK Games. He performed poorly at the major meets that year, finishing last in four of his five outings, and also came last at the 2009 IAAF World Athletics Final. He was eliminated in the first round of the USA Outdoors that year.

The 2010 season marked a resurgence in Wilson's form as he came runner-up behind Oliver at the 2010 USA Outdoor Track and Field Championships. He claimed three successive second places behind his compatriot on the 2010 IAAF Diamond League that July, at the Prefontaine Classic, Meeting Areva and Herculis meets. He won the ISTAF Berlin meeting in August His season's best time of 13.12 seconds, set in Paris, saw him return to the top four in the annual hurdles rankings. He performed less well in 2011: although he competed on the 2011 IAAF Diamond League circuit, his best run was 13.36 seconds for sixth at the Bislett Games. He missed a spot on the world championships team as he was eliminated in the semi-finals at the national championships.

He broke the meet record at the 2012 Drake Relays with a run of 13.20 seconds.

He won the 2013 USA Outdoor Track and Field Championships with a time of 13.08 beating out David Oliver, Aries Merritt and Jason Richardson. He finished second behind David Oliver at the 2013 World Championships in Moscow. At the age of 32, it was Wilson's first appearance on the US National Team.
