= Kseniya Agafonova =

Russian long-distance runner

Kseniya Mikhailovna Agafonova (Russian: Ксения Михайловна Агафонова; born 25 June 1983) is a Russian long-distance runner.

She finished fifth in 5000 metres at the 2007 World Athletics Final. She was the 2009 winner of the Fukuoka International Cross Country meeting.

Agafonova competed at the 2009 World Championships in Athletics and she finished 15th in the 10,000 metres final. She closed the year with an appearance at the 2009 IAAF World Athletics Final.

== Personal bests ==
- 1500 metres - 4:11.10 min (2006)
- 3000 metres - 8:53.30 min (2007)
- 5000 metres - 15:23.17 min (2007)
- 10,000 metres - 31:47.14 min (2007)
