= Stephanie Durst =

American sprinter (born 1982)

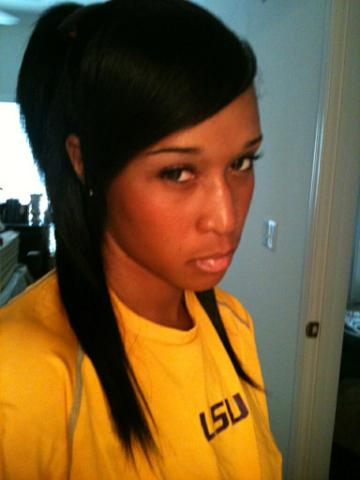
Stephanie Durst

Stephanie Durst (born April 11, 1982) is an American sprinter. She was a 13-time All-American at Louisiana State University (LSU) and finished her career among the top ten all-time in the 60-meter dash and both the indoor and outdoor 200 meters. She also helped lead the Lady Tigers to four National Titles - three indoor and one outdoor.

Following her collegiate career she made her professional debut in 2003. Since beginning her professional career she has set personal bests in the 100 meters (11.09 Indianapolis 2007), and 300 meters (36.64 Glasgow 2007).

At the 2006 World Athletics Final she made her international debut, finishing sixth in the 100 meters and fifth in the 200 meters. She returned at the 2007 World Athletics Final, finishing seventh in the 200 m event.

In 2009, she started the season strong running 11.10 in Dakar, Senegal and twice ran 11.13, but was hampered in the late season with an ankle injury. Stephanie Durst ended the season ranked third amongst women sprinters in the US by Track and Field News.

== Personal bests ==
- 100 metres - 11.09 s (2006)
- 200 metres - 22.48 s (2002)
