= Jonas Cheruiyot =

Kenyan long-distance runner

Jonas Cheruiyot (born 11 January 1984) is a Kenyan long-distance runner who specializes in the 5000 metres.

== Achievements ==
Year	Tournament	Venue	Result	Extra
2006	World Athletics Final	Stuttgart, Germany	9th	5000 m
2007	World Athletics Final	Stuttgart, Germany	8th	3000 m

=== Personal bests ===
- 3000 metres - 7:34.37 min (2007)
- 5000 metres - 12:59.08 min (2006)
