= Josephine Onyia =

Spanish hurdler (born 1986)

Personal information
- Full name: Josephine Onyia Nnkiruka
- Born: 15 July 1986 (age 40) Lagos, Nigeria

Josephine Onyia Nnkiruka (born 15 July 1986) is a Nigerian-born, Spanish track and field former athlete who specialized in the 100 metres hurdles.

In 2016, Onyia was issued with a lifetime ban after received a third anti-doping sanction.

== Career ==
She changed nationality from Nigeria to Spain in April 2007, following in the footsteps of another hurdler Glory Alozie. Her first medal as a Spaniard came at the 2007 IAAF World Athletics Final, where she took the hurdles silver medal. She started the following season with a gold medal at the 2008 European Athletics Indoor Cup, but tripped at the last hurdle at the 2008 IAAF World Indoor Championships and finished in last place. Onyia set a Spanish national record at the 2008 IAAF Golden League meet in ISTAF Berlin meeting, recording 12.50 seconds and improving upon her previous best by 14 hundredths of a second. She competed in the hurdles at the Summer Olympics and just missed the final after finishing fifth in the semi-finals. In 2016, she was disqualified from the 2008 Olympics for doping, and her result was annulled after her 2008 sample was re-tested and failed.

She was the gold medalist at the 2008 IAAF World Athletics Final later that season. However, she tested positive for methylhexaneamine at the 2008 Athletissima meeting and also clenbuterol at the World Athletics Final. Real Federación Española de Atletismo, the Spanish athletics body, decided not to sanction the athlete as she had tested negative twice around the time of the positive clenbuterol test. However, the IAAF intervened and took the case to the Court of Arbitration for Sport (CAS). The CAS upheld the IAAF's appeal and Onyia was suspended for two years and her recent past results were annulled, effectively removing her of all her achievements as a senior athlete. The two separate positive tests were treated as one single breach of the doping rules as she had not been informed of the first until after the second positive test. She received a two-year competitive ban, set to expire on 10 November 2010.

She returned to competition in January 2011, taking an indoor win in Zaragoza. She received a further doping suspension of two years after a failed test for dimethylpentylamine in July 2011.

In August 2015 it was reported that Onyia had tested positive for anabolic steroids at the Spanish athletics championships and that she was pulled from the 2015 World Championships in Athletics and subsequently received a lifetime ban.

== Achievements ==
Year	Competition	Venue	Position	Notes
2003	World Youth Championships	Sherbrooke, Canada	4th	100 m hurdles
2007	World Athletics Final	Stuttgart, Germany	2nd	100 m hurdles
2008	European Indoor Cup	Moscow, Russia	1st	60 m hurdles
2008	World Indoor Championships	Valencia, Spain	8th	60 m hurdles
2008	Olympic Games	Beijing, China	DQ (5th (semis))	100 m hurdles
2008	World Athletics Final	Stuttgart, Germany	DQ (1st)	100 m hurdles
