= Rodney Martin (sprinter) =

American sprinter (born 1982)

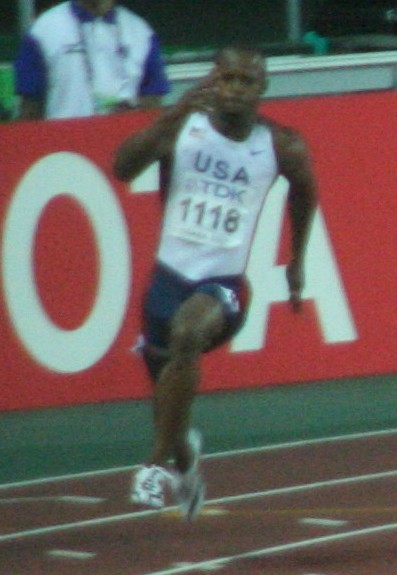
- Rodney Martin in 2007

Personal information
- Nationality: United States
- Born: December 22, 1982 (age 43) Las Vegas, Nevada, U.S.
- Height: 5 ft 9 in (1.75 m)
- Weight: 165 lb (75 kg)

Sport
- Sport: Running
- Event(s): 100 metres, 200 metres

Achievements and titles
- Personal best(s): 100 m: 9.95 s (Eugene 2008); 200 m: 19.99 s (Eugene 2008)
Medal record
2007 4 × 100 m Gold
Men's athletics
Representing United States
World Athletics Final
Bronze medal – third place	2007 Stuttgart	200 m

Rodney Martin (born December 22, 1982) is an American sprinter. Martin is a native of Las Vegas, Nevada. He attended Western High School, where he played football and ran track. At the University of South Carolina Rodney became a three-time All-American and broke the indoor and outdoor 200 m school records. Martin ran 4th place at the 2007 World Championships in Osaka, Japan in the 200 m dash, missing the bronze medal to Wallace Spearmon Jr. by 100th of a second. The Americans placed 1st (Tyson Gay), 3rd place (Wallace Spearmon Jr) and 4th place (Rodney Martin). Martin obtained the gold medal as an alternate running on the gold medal USA 4 × 100 m relay that year. Martin made his first Olympic Team in 2008 in Beijing China, where he ran the first leg of the 4 × 100 metre relay. Rodney has now turned his sights on Music, forming King Martin Music Group out of Houston Tx.

United States at the 2008 Summer Olympics in Beijing. He competed in the 4 × 100 metres relay together with Travis Padgett, Darvis Patton and Tyson Gay. In their qualification heat Martin ran the first leg of the race. They did not finish due to a mistake in the baton exchange and they were eliminated.

As of 2014, Martin was serving in the United States Navy.

== Personal bests ==
=== Outdoor ===
Distance	Time	Wind	Location / Date
100 m	9.95 sec	+1.6 m/s	Eugene / June 28, 2008
200 m	19.99 sec	+1.7 m/s	Eugene / July 6, 2008

=== Indoor ===
Distance	Time	Location / Date
60 m	6.75 sec	Fayetteville / February 27, 2005
200 m	20.38 sec	Fayetteville / March 11, 2005
