= Yusuf Biwott =

Kenyan long-distance runner

Yusuf Kibet Biwott (born 12 November 1986) is a Kenyan long-distance runner. Biwott finished fourth at the 2006 IAAF World Athletics Finals in the 3000m event.

== Achievements ==
| Year | Tournament | Venue | Result | Extra |
|---|---|---|---|---|
| 2006 | World Athletics Final | Stuttgart, Germany | 4th | 3000 m |
| 2007 | World Athletics Final | Stuttgart, Germany | 9th | 3000 m |

=== Personal bests ===
- 1500 metres - 3:34.04 min (2006)
- 3000 metres - 7:33.39 min (2007)
- 5000 metres - 12:58.49 min (2007)
