= Suleiman Simotwo =

Kenyan middle-distance runner

Suleiman Kipses Simotwo (born 21 April 1980) is a Kenyan middle-distance runner who specializes in the 1500 metres. His indoor personal best over 1500 m of 3:35.24 minutes, achieved in 2006, was the second best time in the world that season, only behind Daniel Kipchirchir Komen.

He is from Kaptama in Mount Elgon District. Prominent runner Edith Masai is from the same area.

Simotwo has competed at the IAAF World Athletics Final twice, winning a bronze medal over 1500 m in the 2007 edition. He reached the finals of the 1500 m at the 2008 IAAF World Indoor Championships, finishing in seventh place. Simotwo scored a significant personal best over the 3000 metres distance at the Meeting Grand Prix IAAF de Dakar in 2010, upsetting favourite Tariku Bekele to win in at time of 7:45.15.

== Achievements ==
Year	Competition	Venue	Position	Event
2005	World Athletics Final	Monte Carlo, Monaco	4th	1500 m
2007	World Athletics Final	Stuttgart, Germany	3rd	1500 m
2008	World Indoor Championships	Valencia, Spain	7th	1500 m

=== Personal bests ===
- 800 metres - 1:45.5 min (2005)
- 1500 metres - 3:31.67 min (2006)
- Mile run - 3:50.82 min (2005)
- 3000 metres - 7:45.15 min (2010)
