= LaShauntea Moore =

American athletics competitor

Personal information
- Born: July 31, 1983 (age 43) Akron, Ohio, U.S.
Medal record
Women's athletics (track and field)
Representing United States
World Athletics Final
Bronze medal – third place	2007 Stuttgart	200 m

LaShauntea Moore (born July 31, 1983) is a retired American track and field sprinter who specialized in the 100- and 200-meter dash. She represented the United States at the 2004 Summer Olympics, reaching the 200 m semi-finals. She was also the NCAA outdoor champion in the event that year.

Moore reached the 200 m final at the 2007 World Championships in Athletics and won a bronze medal in the event at the 2007 IAAF World Athletics Final. Her personal bests include 10.97 seconds over 100 m and 22.46 seconds in the 200 m.

== Career ==
=== Early life ===
Born and raised in Akron, Ohio, Moore attended Archbishop Hoban High School and took part at her first global athletics competition at the age of 15, winning the 200 m gold ahead of Melaine Walker and taking fourth in the 100 m at the 1999 IAAF World Youth Championships.

She began attending Barton County Community College and formed a strong women's track pairing with Veronica Campbell. Moore was runner-up in both the sprints at the USATF Junior Olympic National Championships in 2001, finishing behind Angel Perkins in two occasions. At the junior college outdoor championships she was third in the 100 m and runner-up in the 200 m in both 2002 and 2003. She moved to the University of Arkansas in 2003 along with her Barton teammate Veronica Campbell.

=== Olympic and world debut ===
The 2004 season was a significant breakthrough for Moore, starting with a 100 m personal record of 11.26 seconds at the SEC Championships. Later that year she ran a 200 m best of 22.63 seconds in the semi-finals of the NCAA Women's Outdoor Track and Field Championship before going on to win the final in a wind-assisted 22.37 seconds (2.3 m/s). She was also fourth in the 100 m in 11.31 seconds. In July she took third in the women's 200 m at the 2004 United States Olympic Trials behind Allyson Felix and Muna Lee, gaining her qualification in the event for the 2004 Summer Olympic Games. She reached the Olympic semi-finals of the women's 200 m but could not match her form of earlier in the season, finishing sixth in a time of 22.93 seconds.

Her following two seasons were low profile, with 2005 being highlighted by a 100 m win in Salamanca, and 2006 performances in the 200 m including a win at the Reebok Grand Prix and a fifth-place finish at the USA Track and Field Championships. She began training with Olympic gold medalist Jon Drummond during this period. Her Olympic year form returned in 2007, which she began with personal record-equalling run of 11.26 seconds at the Mt. SAC Relays and an outright 200 m best of 22.46 seconds to finish as runner-up at the Adidas Track Classic. She finished fourth in the 200 m at the 2007 US Outdoor National Championships, but due to the fact that the race winner (Allyson Felix) was automatically qualified for the 2007 World Championships in Athletics as the reigning world champion, Moore gained a position on the US team. She went on to be one of four American women to reach the 2007 World 200 m final (along with Felix, Sanya Richards and Torri Edwards) but she only managed seventh place with a below-peak form run of 22.97 seconds. After making appearances in the 2007 IAAF Golden League, at the ISTAF and Memorial Van Damme meetings, she closed the season by winning a bronze medal at the 2007 IAAF World Athletics Final – her first global senior medal.

=== 2008–2010 ===
Moore's 2008 season peaked at the Olympic Trials, where she recorded a 100 m best of 11.03 seconds in the qualifiers but was eighth in the final with 11.22 seconds. She was knocked out of the 200 m trials at the semi-final stages and did not compete at the 2008 Olympic Games. The following year she reached the 200 m final at the 2009 US National finals, but finished in last place and missed out on qualification for the 2009 World Championships in Athletics.

She had a strong start to the 2010 outdoor season in April, running an early world lead and 100 m meet record of 11.06 seconds at the Drake Relays. She equalled her 200 m best in Baie Mahault in May and went on to win the 100 m at the Grande Prêmio Caixa Maringá de Atletismo in Maringá, Brazil later that month, going sub-11 for the first time in a personal best run of 10.97 seconds. It was the first time any female had broken the 11 second barrier on South American soil. She took second place in the 100 m 2010 USA Outdoor Track and Field Championships, finishing behind Allyson Felix.

== Personal bests ==
Event	Time (sec)	Venue	Date
60 meters	7.36	Carbondale, Illinois, United States	March 8, 2003
100 meters	10.97	Maringá, Brazil	May 30, 2010
200 meters	22.46	Baie Mahault, Guadalupe	May 1, 2010

- All information taken from IAAF profile.

== Competition record ==
Year	Competition	Venue	Position	Event	Notes
2004	Olympic Games	Athens, Greece	6th (semis)	200 m	
2007	World Championships	Osaka, Japan	7th	200 m	
2007	IAAF World Athletics Final	Stuttgart, Germany	3rd	200 m	
