= Daniel Kipchirchir Komen =

Kenyan middle-distance runner

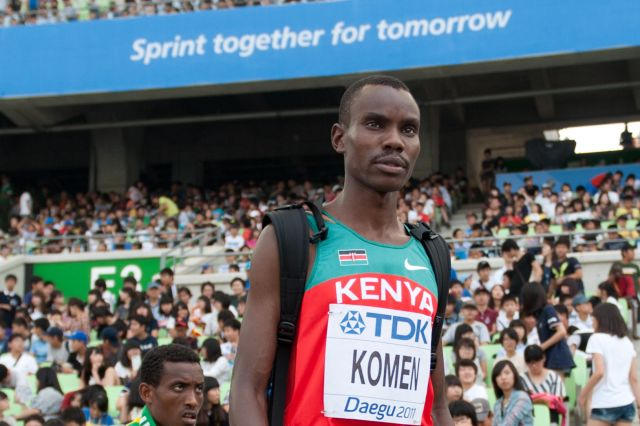
- Komen at the 2011 World championships Athletics in Daegu.

Medal record

Men's Athletics

Representing Kenya

World Indoor Championships
Silver medal – second place	2006 Moscow	1500 m
Silver medal – second place	2008 Valencia	1500 m

Daniel Kipchirchir Komen (born November 27, 1984, in Chemorgong, Koibatek District) is a Kenyan middle-distance runner who specializes in the 1500 metres.

He graduated from Timboroa High School in 2003. He started running seriously while at high school.

In 2003 he finished second at the 2003 African Junior Championships 5000 metres race, behind Boniface Kiprop Toroitich of Uganda. He competed at the 2005 World Championships in Athletics in Helsinki but missed the 1500 metres final.

On June 10, 2007, he ran the fastest mile ever run in the United States, breaking a record that Eamonn Coghlan had held since 1983 with a 3:48.28 in Eugene, Oregon. He competed at the 2007 World Championships in Athletics in Osaka missing the 1500 metres final.

He is coached by Jimmy Beuttah and Joseph Ngure. Komen trains at the IAAF High Altitude Training Centre in Eldoret.

== Achievements ==
Year	Tournament	Venue	Result	Extra
2005	World Athletics Final	Monte Carlo, Monaco	5th	1500 m
2006	World Indoor Championships	Moscow, Russia	2nd	1500 m
2007	World Athletics Final	Stuttgart, Germany	1st	1500 m
2008	World Indoor Championships	Valencia, Spain	2nd	1500 m

=== Personal bests ===
- 1500 metres - 3:29.02 - Rome (ITA) - 14/07/2006
- Mile - 3:48.28 - Eugene (OR) - 10/06/2007
- 3000 metres - 7:31.41 - Doha - 06/05/2011
- 5000 metres - 13:04.02 - Rabat - 06/06/2010
