= Shedrack Kibet Korir =

Kenyan runner (born 1978)

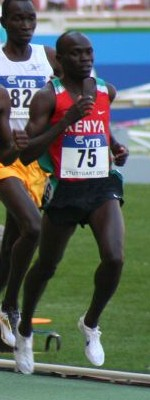

Medal record

Men's athletics

World Championships
Bronze medal – third place	2007 Osaka	1500 m

Shedrack Kibet Korir (born 14 December 1978 in Nandi District) is a Kenyan runner who specializes in the 1500 and 3000 metres.

He won the bronze medal in the 1500m at the 2007 World Championships in Osaka.

He is based at the PACE Sports Management training camp in Kaptagat.

== Competition record ==
Year	Competition	Venue	Position	Event	Notes
Representing Kenya
2005	World Athletics Final	Monte Carlo, Monaco	6th	3000 m	7:40.97
2006	World Indoor Championships	Moscow, Russia	5th	3000 m	7:42.58
2006	African Championships	Bambous, Mauritius	7th	1500 m	3:48.16
2006	World Athletics Final	Stuttgart, Germany	7th	1500 m	3:34.34
2006	World Athletics Final	Stuttgart, Germany	5th	3000 m	7:40.05
2007	World Championships	Osaka, Japan	3rd	1500 m	3:35.04

=== Personal bests ===
- 1500 metres – 3:31.18 min (2007)
- 3000 metres – 7:37.50 min (2006)
- 5000 metres – 13:09.92 min (2005)
