= Aarik Wilson =

American long jumper and triple jumper

Personal information
- Born: October 25, 1982 (age 43) Reno, Nevada, United States

Sport
- Sport: Track and field

Aarik Wilson (born October 25, 1982, in Reno, Nevada) is an American long jumper and triple jumper. He attended Indiana University in Bloomington, Indiana.

US Olympic Trials Triple Jump Champion 2008, US National Indoor Triple Jump Champion 2008, US National Outdoor Triple Jump Champion 2007, US National Indoor Triple Jump Champion 2007(17.28 m), 3rd National Indoor Championships in Long Jump 2007 (8.00 m).

He also finished fifth at the 2003 Pan American Games and sixth at the 2006 World Athletics Final. He competed at the 2006 IAAF World Indoor Championships without reaching the final round.

His performances in 2006 earned him a ninth place on the Track & Field News world ranking; his first ranking among the top ten.

According to his biography page at usatf.org, his personal best triple jump outdoors is 17.58 metres (57.7 ft), achieved in August 2007 in London. His indoor PR in the triple jump is 17.28 metres (56.7 ft). Wilson's PR in the long jump is 8.17 metres (26.8 ft).

He won the 2008 U.S. Olympic Team Trials in Eugene, OR with a best jump of 17.43 metres (57.2 ft).

Wilson also holds the Nevada Interscholastic Athletic Association (NIAA) 4A State Meet record in the triple jump, with a mark of 51-01.25 feet, set in 2001 as a senior at Churchill County High School in Fallon, NV.
