= Michelle Perry =

American athlete (born 1979)

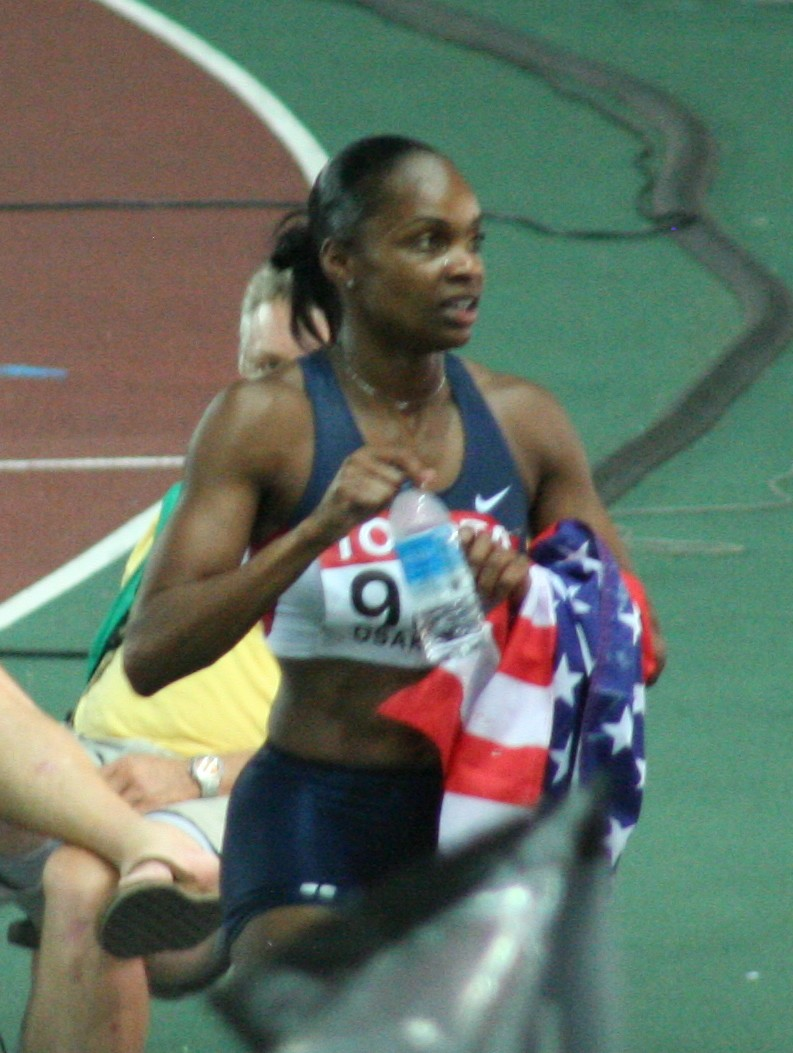
- Perry in 2007

Personal information
- Born: May 1, 1979 (age 47) Los Angeles, California, United States

Sport
- Sport: Track and field
Medal record
Women's athletics
Representing the United States
World Championships
| Gold medal – first place | 2005 Helsinki | 100 m hurdles |
| Gold medal – first place | 2007 Osaka | 100 m hurdles |

Michelle Perry (born May 1, 1979) is an American athlete. At the 2004 Summer Olympics she placed 14th overall in the heptathlon competition. Later, at the 2005 World Championships in Athletics, she earned a gold medal in the 100 m hurdles with a time of 12.66 seconds. Her current personal record in the event is 12.43 seconds.

Perry attended Quartz Hill High School in Lancaster, California and finished second in the 1997 CIF California State Meet in the Long jump. Competing for the UCLA Bruins track and field team, Perry finished runner-up in the heptathlon at the 2001 NCAA Division I Outdoor Track and Field Championships.

At the 2007 World Championships in Athletics in Osaka, Japan she successfully defended her title with another 100 m hurdles gold medal performance; winning in a time of 12.46 seconds. The result was surrounded by some debate since she ran on the next lane (Susanna Kallur's lane) and some think she made contact with the Swede over the last hurdle. Despite television evidence, there was no official decision as the Swedish protest was filed too late.

Perry missed out on a spot for the 2008 Beijing Olympics, but made the team for the 2009 World Championships in Athletics. However, she was unable to defend her title as she entered the competition with a knee injury and was eliminated in the first round. She missed the 2010 and 2011 seasons due to injury and pregnancy.

== Audio interviews ==
- Michelle reflects on her 2007 and second consecutive 100m World Championship gold medal

Sporting positions
| Preceded by (United States) Joanna Hayes | Women's 100m Hurdles Best Year Performance; 2005 — 2007 | Succeeded by (United States) Lolo Jones |
