= 2007 IAAF World Athletics Final =

International track and field competition

The 5th IAAF World Athletics Final was held at the Gottlieb-Daimler-Stadion in Stuttgart, Germany on September 22 and September 23, 2007.

== Results ==
=== Men ===
| Event | Gold | | Silver | | Bronze | |
|---|---|---|---|---|---|---|
| 100 m | Asafa Powell; Jamaica | 9.83 CR | Jaysuma Saidy Ndure; Norway | 10.06 NR | Michael Frater; Jamaica | 10.11 |
| 200 m | Jaysuma Saidy Ndure; Norway | 19.89 NR | Wallace Spearmon; United States | 20.18 | Rodney Martin; United States | 20.27 |
| 400 m | LaShawn Merritt; United States | 44.58 | Tyler Christopher; Canada | 44.87 | Angelo Taylor; United States | 44.92 |
| 800 m | Yusuf Saad Kamel; Bahrain | 1:45.61 CR | Mbulaeni Mulaudzi; South Africa | 1:45.67 | Belal Mansoor Ali; Bahrain | 1:45.93 |
| 1500 m | Daniel Kipchirchir Komen; Kenya | 3:37.96 | Mehdi Baala; France | 3:38.35 | Suleiman Kipses Simotwo; Kenya | 3:38.36 |
| 3000 m | Edwin Soi; Kenya | 7:48.81 | Joseph Ebuya; Kenya | 7:49.70 | Mo Farah; Great Britain | 7:49.89 |
| 5000 m | Edwin Soi; Kenya | 13:38.16 | Micah Kogo; Kenya | 13:39.91 | Moses Ndiema Masai; Kenya | 13:39.96 |
| 3000 m St. | Paul Kipsiele Koech; Kenya | 8:00.67 | Richard Kipkemboi Mateelong; Kenya | 8:07.66 | Brimin Kiprop Kipruto; Kenya | 8:11.05 |
| 110 m H | Dayron Robles; Cuba | 12.92 CR | David Payne; United States | 13.08 | Terrence Trammell; United States | 13.15 |
| 400 m H | Marek Plawgo; Poland | 48.35 | Kerron Clement; United States | 48.35 | James Carter; United States | 48.36 |
| High jump | Donald Thomas; Bahamas | 2.32 | Stefan Holm; Sweden | 2.30 | Linus Thörnblad; Sweden | 2.27 |
| Pole vault | Brad Walker; United States | 5.91 | Björn Otto; Germany | 5.86 | Steven Hooker; Australia | 5.81 |
| Long jump | Andrew Howe; Italy | 8.35 | Brian Johnson; United States | 8.16 | Godfrey Khotso Mokoena; South Africa | 8.12 |
| Triple jump | Walter Davis; United States | 17.35 SB | Aarik Wilson; United States | 17.34 | Nelson Évora; Portugal | 17.30 |
| Shot put | Reese Hoffa; United States | 20.98 | Adam Nelson; United States | 20.95 | Dan Taylor; United States | 20.74 |
| Discus | Gerd Kanter; Estonia | 66.54 | Virgilijus Alekna; Lithuania | 65.94 | Piotr Małachowski; Poland | 65.35 |
| Hammer | Ivan Tsikhan; Belarus | 82.05 | Krisztián Pars; Hungary | 78.42 | Koji Murofushi; Japan | 77.95 |
| Javelin | Tero Pitkämäki; Finland | 88.19 | Andreas Thorkildsen; Norway | 85.06 | Magnus Arvidsson; Sweden | 83.37 |
WR world record | AR area record | CR championship record | GR games record | NR national record | OR Olympic record | PB personal best | SB season best | WL world leading (in a given season)

=== Women ===
| Event | Gold | | Silver | | Bronze | |
|---|---|---|---|---|---|---|
| 100 m | Carmelita Jeter; United States | 11.10 | Allyson Felix; United States | 11.15 | Christine Arron; France | 11.20 |
| 200 m | Muriel Hurtis-Houairi; France | 22.73 | Debbie Ferguson-McKenzie; Bahamas | 22.74 | LaShauntea Moore; United States | 22.78 |
| 400 m | Sanya Richards; United States | 49.27 WL | Novlene Williams; Jamaica | 50.12 | Christine Ohuruogu; Great Britain | 50.20 |
| 800 m | Janeth Jepkosgei; Kenya | 1:57.87 CR | Mayte Martínez; Spain | 1:58.14 | Marilyn Okoro; Great Britain | 1:58.76 PB |
| 1500 m | Maryam Yusuf Jamal; Bahrain | 4:01.23 | Yelena Soboleva; Russia | 4:05.35 | Agnes Samaria; Namibia | 4:05.44 NR |
| 3000 m | Meseret Defar; Ethiopia | 8:27.24 CR | Vivian Cheruiyot; Kenya | 8:28.66 PB | Priscah Jepleting Cherono; Kenya | 29.06 PB |
| 5000 m | Vivian Cheruiyot; Kenya | 14:56.94 | Sylvia Jebiwott Kibet; Kenya | 14:57.37 PB | Priscah Jepleting Cherono; Kenya | 14:58.97 |
| 3000 m St. | Eunice Jepkorir; Kenya | 9:35.03 | Roisin McGettigan; Ireland | 9:35.86 | Cristina Casandra; Romania | 9:36.38 |
| 100 m H | Michelle Perry; United States | 12.68 | Josephine Onyia; Spain | 12.70 | Delloreen Ennis-London; Jamaica | 12.72 |
| 400 m H | Anna Jesień; Poland | 54.17 | Jana Rawlinson; Australia | 54.19 | Melaine Walker; Jamaica | 54.31 |
| High jump | Blanka Vlašić; Croatia | 2.00 | Antonietta Di Martino; Italy | 1.97 | Anna Chicherova; Russia | 1.97 |
| Pole vault | Yelena Isinbayeva; Russia | 4.87 CR | Monika Pyrek; Poland | 4.82 PB | Svetlana Feofanova; Russia | 4.82 SB |
| Long jump | Tatyana Lebedeva; Russia | 6.78 | Grace Upshaw; United States | 6.64 | Oksana Udmurtova; Russia | 6.52 |
| Triple jump | Yargelis Savigne; Cuba | 14.78 | Hrysopiyí Devetzí; Greece | 14.75 | Tatyana Lebedeva; Russia | 14.72 |
| Shot put | Nadzeya Astapchuk; Belarus | 20.45 CR | Valerie Vili; New Zealand | 20.40 | Nadine Kleinert; Germany | 19.36 |
| Discus | Franka Dietzsch; Germany | 62.58 | Věra Pospíšilová-Cechlová; Czech Republic | 62.04 | Nicoleta Grasu; Romania | 61.75 |
| Hammer | Yipsi Moreno; Cuba | 73.76 | Ivana Brkljačić; Croatia | 73.22 | Clarissa Claretti; Italy | 70.34 |
| Javelin | Barbora Špotáková; Czech Republic | 67.12 NR | Steffi Nerius; Germany | 64.90 | Christina Obergföll; Germany | 62.47 |
WR world record | AR area record | CR championship record | GR games record | NR national record | OR Olympic record | PB personal best | SB season best | WL world leading (in a given season)

== See also ==
- 2007 in athletics (track and field)
