= 2005 IAAF World Athletics Final – Results =

The 2005 IAAF World Athletics Final took place in at the Stade Louis II in Monte Carlo, Monaco on 9 to 10 September. The hammer throw events were staged separately on 3 September in Szombathely, Hungary, due to stadium limitations in Monaco.

The year's top seven athletes, based on their points ranking of the 2005 IAAF World Athletics Tour, qualified to compete in each event, with an extra four athletes selected for races of 1500 metres and above. One additional athlete, a wildcard, was allocated to each event by the IAAF and replacement athletes were admitted to replace the qualified athletes that could not attend the final.

== Track ==
Key

Wild card athlete

Events
100 m	200 m	400 m	800 m	1500 m	3000 m	5000 m	110/100 m h	400 m h	3000 m st

=== 100 metres ===
Men's
Rank	Athlete	Nation	Time (sec)	Reaction time	Notes
1	Marc Burns	Trinidad and Tobago (TTO)	10.00	0.143	
2	Aziz Zakari	Ghana (GHA)	10.01	0.141	
3	Dwight Thomas	Jamaica (JAM)	10.01	0.159	
4	Darrel Brown	Trinidad and Tobago (TTO)	10.05	0.127	
5	Ronald Pognon	France (FRA)	10.07	0.145	
6	Francis Obikwelu	Portugal (POR)	10.09	0.181	
7	Leonard Scott	United States (USA)	10.18	0.193	
—	Michael Frater	Jamaica (JAM)	DNS		

Women's
Rank	Athlete	Nation	Time (sec)	Reaction time	Notes
1	Veronica Campbell Brown	Jamaica (JAM)	10.92	0.164	
2	Christine Arron	France (FRA)	10.93	0.130	SB
3	Lauryn Williams	United States (USA)	11.04	0.167	
4	Chandra Sturrup	Bahamas (BAH)	11.07	0.166	
5	Me'Lisa Barber	United States (USA)	11.09	0.172	
6	Sherone Simpson	Jamaica (JAM)	11.21	0.153	
7	Yuliya Nestsiarenka	Belarus (BLR)	11.23	0.137	
8	Kim Gevaert	Belgium (BEL)	11.42	0.129	

=== 200 metres ===
Men's
Rank	Athlete	Nation	Time (sec)	Reaction time	Notes
1	Tyson Gay	United States (USA)	19.96	0.168	CR
2	Christopher Williams	Jamaica (JAM)	20.19	0.138	SB
3	Wallace Spearmon	United States (USA)	20.21	0.164	
4	Justin Gatlin	United States (USA)	20.25	0.208	
5	Stéphane Buckland	Mauritius (MRI)	20.64	0.193	
6	Aaron Armstrong	Trinidad and Tobago (TTO)	20.75	0.179	
7	André da Silva	Brazil (BRA)	20.81	0.142	
8	John Capel	United States (USA)	21.04	0.174	

Women's
Rank	Athlete	Nation	Time (sec)	Reaction time	Notes
1	Allyson Felix	United States (USA)	22.27	0.169	CR
2	Veronica Campbell Brown	Jamaica (JAM)	22.37	0.166	
3	Christine Arron	France (FRA)	22.43	0.188	
4	Cydonie Mothersille	Cayman Islands (CAY)	22.92	0.212	
5	Kim Gevaert	Belgium (BEL)	22.93	0.156	
6	Yulia Gushchina	Russia (RUS)	23.18	0.241	
7	Fabienne Féraez	Benin (BEN)	23.21	0.173	
8	Lucimar Aparecida de Moura	Brazil (BRA)	23.57	0.136	

=== 400 metres ===
Men's
Rank	Athlete	Nation	Time (sec)	Reaction time	Notes
1	Tyree Washington	United States (USA)	44.51	0.175	CR
2	Timothy Benjamin	Great Britain (GBR)	44.56	0.145	PB
3	Chris Brown	Bahamas (BAH)	44.68	0.158	
4	Brandon Simpson	Jamaica (JAM)	44.86	0.152	
5	Michael Blackwood	Jamaica (JAM)	44.88	0.198	
6	Carlos Santa	Dominican Republic (DOM)	45.06	0.174	SB
7	Alleyne Francique	Grenada (GRN)	45.78	0.178	
8	Jeremy Wariner	United States (USA)	46.37	0.223	

Women's
Rank	Athlete	Nation	Time (sec)	Reaction time	Notes
1	Sanya Richards-Ross	United States (USA)	49.52	0.186	
2	Tonique Williams-Darling	Bahamas (BAH)	49.54	0.193	
3	DeeDee Trotter	United States (USA)	50.64	0.291	
4	Amy Mbacké Thiam	Senegal (SEN)	50.69	0.176	SB
5	Christine Amertil	Bahamas (BAH)	51.23	0.189	
6	Monique Hennagan	United States (USA)	51.31	0.148	
7	Svetlana Pospelova	Russia (RUS)	51.50	0.129	
8	Natalya Antyukh	Russia (RUS)	51.90	0.198	

=== 800 metres ===
Men's
Rank	Athlete	Nation	Time (min)	Notes
1	Wilfred Bungei	Kenya (KEN)	1:47.05	
2	Yusuf Saad Kamel	Bahrain (BHR)	1:47.13	
3	Yuriy Borzakovskiy	Russia (RUS)	1:47.18	
4	William Yiampoy	Kenya (KEN)	1:47.20	
5	Mbulaeni Mulaudzi	South Africa (RSA)	1:47.22	
6	Alfred Kirwa Yego	Kenya (KEN)	1:47.39	
7	Antonio Manuel Reina	Spain (ESP)	1:48.18	
8	Gary Reed	Canada (CAN)	1:49.60	

Women's
Rank	Athlete	Nation	Time (min)	Notes
1	Zulia Calatayud	Cuba (CUB)	1:59.07	CR
2	Hasna Benhassi	Morocco (MAR)	1:59.86	
3	Mayte Martínez	Spain (ESP)	2:00.36	
4	Olga Kotlyarova	Russia (RUS)	2:00.94	
5	Larisa Chzhao	Russia (RUS)	2:01.63	
6	Svetlana Cherkasova	Russia (RUS)	2:01.93	
7	Hazel Clark	United States (USA)	2:04.04	
—	Tatyana Andrianova	Russia (RUS)	DQ	

=== 1500 metres ===
Men's
Rank	Athlete	Nation	Time (min)	Notes
1	Ivan Heshko	Ukraine (UKR)	3:33.50	CR
2	Bernard Lagat	United States (USA)	3:33.55	
3	Alex Kipchirchir Rono	Kenya (KEN)	3:33.71	
4	Suleiman Kipses Simotwo	Kenya (KEN)	3:33.71	
5	Daniel Kipchirchir Komen	Kenya (KEN)	3:33.72	
6	Daham Najim Bashir	Qatar (QAT)	3:34.56	
7	Anter Zerguelaine	Algeria (ALG)	3:36.34	
8	Rashid Ramzi	Bahrain (BHR)	3:36.88	
9	Laban Rotich	Kenya (KEN)	3:39.99	
10	Juan Carlos Higuero	Spain (ESP)	3:45.45	
11	Rui Silva	Portugal (POR)	3:50.17	

Women's
Rank	Athlete	Nation	Time (min)	Notes
1	Maryam Yusuf Jamal	Bahrain (BHR)	3:59.35	
2	Tatyana Tomashova	Russia (RUS)	4:00.28	
3	Natalya Yevdokimova	Russia (RUS)	4:00.60	
4	Bouchra Ghézielle	France (FRA)	4:01.28	PB
5	Hind Déhiba Chahyd	France (FRA)	4:02.08	
6	Yuliya Fomenko	Russia (RUS)	4:02.83	
7	Carmen Douma-Hussar	Canada (CAN)	4:03.10	
8	Natalia Rodríguez	Spain (ESP)	4:03.72	
9	Olga Yegorova	Russia (RUS)	4:07.71	
10	Helen Clitheroe	Great Britain (GBR)	4:09.41	
11	Alesia Turava	Belarus (BLR)	4:11.42	
—	Nancy Jebet Langat	Kenya (KEN)	DNS	

=== 3000 metres ===
Men's
Rank	Athlete	Nation	Time (min)	Notes
1	Bernard Lagat	United States (USA)	7:38.00	SB
2	Eliud Kipchoge	Kenya (KEN)	7:38.95	
3	Augustine Kiprono Choge	Kenya (KEN)	7:39.99	
4	Benjamin Limo	Kenya (KEN)	7:40.22	
5	Tariku Bekele	Ethiopia (ETH)	7:40.30	
6	Shedrack Kibet Korir	Kenya (KEN)	7:40.97	
7	Boniface Kiprotich Songok	Kenya (KEN)	7:40.98	
8	Ali Saïdi-Sief	Algeria (ALG)	7:41.61	
9	Markos Geneti	Ethiopia (ETH)	7:41.76	
10	Abderrahim Goumri	Morocco (MAR)	7:43.93	SB
11	Mounir Yemmouni	France (FRA)	8:10.57	

Women's
Rank	Athlete	Nation	Time (min)	Notes
1	Meseret Defar	Ethiopia (ETH)	8:47.26	
2	Gelete Burka	Ethiopia (ETH)	8:48.65	
3	Zakia Mrisho	Tanzania (TAN)	8:49.63	
4	Isabella Ochichi	Kenya (KEN)	8:49.79	
5	Meselech Melkamu	Ethiopia (ETH)	8:50.42	
6	Edith Masai	Kenya (KEN)	8:50.78	
7	Susanne Wigene	Norway (NOR)	8:51.41	
8	Priscah Jepleting Cherono	Kenya (KEN)	8:53.18	
9	Carmen Douma-Hussar	Canada (CAN)	8:53.83	PB
10	Liliya Shobukhova	Russia (RUS)	9:02.23	
11	Deriba Alemu	Ethiopia (ETH)	9:04.98	

=== 5000 metres ===
Men's
Rank	Athlete	Nation	Time (min)	Notes
1	Sileshi Sihine	Ethiopia (ETH)	13:39.40	
2	Boniface Toroitich Kiprop	Uganda (UGA)	13:40.03	
3	Isaac Kiprono Songok	Kenya (KEN)	13:40.24	
4	Gebregziabher Gebremariam	Ethiopia (ETH)	13:40.59	
5	Sammy Kipketer	Kenya (KEN)	13:41.06	
6	James Kwalia C'Kurui	Qatar (QAT)	13:41.10	
7	Boniface Kiprotich Songok	Kenya (KEN)	13:42.25	
8	John Kemboi Kibowen	Kenya (KEN)	13:44.81	
9	Abebe Dinkesa	Ethiopia (ETH)	13:46.51	
10	Mark Bett Kipkinyor	Kenya (KEN)	13:50.94	
11	Robert Kipngetich	Kenya (KEN)	13:59.65	
—	Dejene Berhanu	Ethiopia (ETH)	DNS	

Women's
Rank	Athlete	Nation	Time (min)	Notes
1	Meseret Defar	Ethiopia (ETH)	14:45.87	CR
2	Tirunesh Dibaba	Ethiopia (ETH)	14:46.84	
3	Berhane Adere	Ethiopia (ETH)	14:46.91	
4	Iness Chepkesis Chenonge	Kenya (KEN)	14:54.43	PB
5	Lucy Wangui Kabuu	Kenya (KEN)	15:00.20	SB
6	Sabrina Mockenhaupt	Germany (GER)	15:12.43	
7	Kim Smith	New Zealand (NZL)	15:14.91	
8	Deriba Alemu	Ethiopia (ETH)	15:17.13	
9	Irene Kwambai Kipchumba	Kenya (KEN)	15:23.22	
10	Krisztina Papp	Hungary (HUN)	15:43.19	
—	Ejegayehu Dibaba	Ethiopia (ETH)	DNF	

=== 110/100 metres hurdles ===
Men's
Rank	Athlete	Nation	Time (sec)	Reaction time	Notes
1	Allen Johnson	United States (USA)	13.09	0.157	CR
2	Dominique Arnold	United States (USA)	13.10	0.135	
3	Terrence Trammell	United States (USA)	13.17	0.136	
4	Stanislavs Olijars	Latvia (LAT)	13.17	0.159	
5	Maurice Wignall	Jamaica (JAM)	13.20	0.139	SB
6	Ladji Doucouré	France (FRA)	13.27	0.127	
7	Joel Brown	United States (USA)	13.28	0.117	
8	Ron Bramlett	United States (USA)	13.32	0.151	

Women's
Rank	Athlete	Nation	Time (sec)	Reaction time	Notes
1	Michelle Perry	United States (USA)	12.54	0.145	
2	Brigitte Foster-Hylton	Jamaica (JAM)	12.55	0.139	SB
3	Delloreen Ennis-London	Jamaica (JAM)	12.57	0.158	SB
4	Susanna Kallur	Sweden (SWE)	12.74	0.202	
5	Glory Alozie	Spain (ESP)	12.76	0.186	
6	Joanna Hayes	United States (USA)	12.78	0.175	
7	Perdita Felicien	Canada (CAN)	12.80	0.163	
8	Kirsten Bolm	Germany (GER)	12.84	0.193	

=== 400 metres hurdles ===
Men's
Rank	Athlete	Nation	Time (sec)	Reaction time	Notes
1	Bershawn Jackson	United States (USA)	48.05	0.173	
2	Kemel Thompson	Jamaica (JAM)	48.09	0.182	SB
3	L.J. van Zyl	South Africa (RSA)	48.11	0.174	PB
4	Naman Keïta	France (FRA)	48.36	0.188	
5	James Carter	United States (USA)	48.62	0.162	
6	Bayano Kamani	Panama (PAN)	49.30	0.157	
7	Gianni Carabelli	Italy (ITA)	49.84	0.220	
8	Ian Weakley	Jamaica (JAM)	50.72	0.210	

Women's
Rank	Athlete	Nation	Time (sec)	Reaction time	Notes
1	Lashinda Demus	United States (USA)	53.37	0.191	CR
2	Yuliya Pechenkina	Russia (RUS)	53.80	0.153	
3	Sandra Glover	United States (USA)	54.09	0.226	
4	Anna Jesień	Poland (POL)	55.22	0.188	
5	Andrea Blackett	Barbados (BAR)	55.25	0.172	
6	Malgorzata Pskit	Poland (POL)	55.72	0.196	
7	Tetiana Tereschuk-Antipova	Ukraine (UKR)	56.28	0.271	
8	Surita Febbraio	South Africa (RSA)	56.83	0.158	

=== 3000 metres steeplechase ===
Men's
Rank	Athlete	Nation	Time (min)	Notes
1	Paul Kipsiele Koech	Kenya (KEN)	8:07.91	
2	Ezekiel Kemboi	Kenya (KEN)	8:09.04	SB
3	Brimin Kiprop Kipruto	Kenya (KEN)	8:09.20	
4	Wesley Kiprotich	Kenya (KEN)	8:09.43	SB
5	Bouabdellah Tahri	France (FRA)	8:10.13	
6	Brahim Boulami	Morocco (MAR)	8:14.43	
7	Musa Amer Obaid	Qatar (QAT)	8:14.92	
8	Kipkirui Misoi	Kenya (KEN)	8:21.01	
9	Simon Vroemen	Netherlands (NED)	8:23.97	
10	Richard Kipkemboi Mateelong	Kenya (KEN)	8:29.00	
11	Antonio David Jiménez	Spain (ESP)	8:29.28	
—	Saif Saaeed Shaheen	Qatar (QAT)	DNS	

Women's
Rank	Athlete	Nation	Time (min)	Notes
1	Docus Inzikuru	Uganda (UGA)	9:21.80	
2	Wioletta Frankiewicz	Poland (POL)	9:25.47	
3	Mardrea Hyman	Jamaica (JAM)	9:27.21	AR
4	Lívia Tóth	Hungary (HUN)	9:30.20	NR
5	Yelena Zadorozhnaya	Russia (RUS)	9:32.41	PB
6	Korene Hinds	Jamaica (JAM)	9:33.46	
7	Cristina Casandra	Romania (ROU)	9:46.06	
8	Elizabeth Jackson	United States (USA)	9:46.10	
9	Roisin McGettigan	Ireland (IRL)	9:46.12	SB
10	Salome Chepchumba	Kenya (KEN)	9:53.83	
11	Jo Ankier	Great Britain (GBR)	9:56.16	
12	Lisa Aguilera	United States (USA)	10:05.01	

== Field ==
Events
High jump	Pole vault	Long jump	Triple jump	Shot put	Discus	Hammer	Javelin

=== High jump ===
Men's
Rank	Athlete	Nation	Result (m)	Notes	2.15	2.20	2.25	2.29	2.32	2.35
1	Víctor Moya	Cuba (CUB)	2.35	CR	O	O	O	O	XXO	O
2	Vyacheslav Voronin	Russia (RUS)	2.32		O	O	O	XXO	O	XXX
3	Yaroslav Rybakov	Russia (RUS)	2.32		–	O	O	O	XO	XXX
3	Stefan Holm	Sweden (SWE)	2.32		O	O	O	O	XO	XXX
5	Andriy Sokolovskyy	Ukraine (UKR)	2.29		O	XO	XO	XO	XXX	
6	Jacques Freitag	South Africa (RSA)	2.29		O	O	XO	XXO	XXX	
7	Jaroslav Bába	Czech Republic (CZE)	2.20		O	XO	XXX			
8	Yuriy Krimarenko	Ukraine (UKR)	2.20		O	XXO	XXX			

Women's
Rank	Athlete	Nation	Result (m)	Notes	1.80	1.85	1.89	1.93	1.96	2.00	2.07
1	Kajsa Bergqvist	Sweden (SWE)	2.00		–	O	–	O	O	XXO	XXX
2	Iryna Mykhalchenko	Ukraine (UKR)	1.93		O	O	O	O	XXX		
2	Vita Palamar	Ukraine (UKR)	1.93		–	O	O	O	XXX		
4	Chaunté Lowe	United States (USA)	1.93		XO	O	XXO	O	XXX		
5	Vita Styopina	Ukraine (UKR)	1.93	SB	O	O	O	XXO	XXX		
6	Tatyana Kivimyagi	Russia (RUS)	1.93		O	O	XO	XXO	XXX		
7	Ruth Beitia	Spain (ESP)	1.89		O	O	O	XXX			
7	Anna Chicherova	Russia (RUS)	1.89		O	O	O	XXX			

=== Pole vault ===
Men's
Rank	Athlete	Nation	Result (m)	Notes	5.45	5.60	5.70	5.78	5.86	6.04
1	Brad Walker	United States (USA)	5.86		–	O	O	–	O	XXX
2	Tim Lobinger	Germany (GER)	5.70		–	O	O	XXX		
3	Giuseppe Gibilisco	Italy (ITA)	5.60		–	O	–	XXX		
3	Igor Pavlov	Russia (RUS)	5.60		O	O	XXX			
5	Derek Miles	United States (USA)	5.60		XO	O	XX-	X		
6	Timothy Mack	United States (USA)	5.60		XXO	O	XXX			
7	Toby Stevenson	United States (USA)	5.60		–	XXO	–	XXX		
8	Rens Blom	Netherlands (NED)	5.45		XXO	XX				

Women's
Rank	Athlete	Nation	Result (m)	Notes	4.20	4.35	4.50	4.62	4.74	5.02
1	Elena Isinbaeva	Russia (RUS)	4.74		–	–	–	O	XO	XXX
2	Monika Pyrek	Poland (POL)	4.62		–	O	XXO	XXO	XXX	
3	Tatyana Polnova	Russia (RUS)	4.50		O	O	O	XXX		
4	Vanessa Boslak	France (FRA)	4.50		O	XO	XO	XXX		
5	Pavla Rybová	Czech Republic (CZE)	4.35		XO	O	XXX			
5	Dana Ellis	Canada (CAN)	4.35		XO	O	XXX			
7	Anna Rogowska	Poland (POL)	4.35		–	XXO	–	XXX		
8	Thórey Edda Elisdóttir	Iceland (ISL)	4.20		XO	XXX				

=== Long jump ===
Men's
Rank	Athlete	Nation	Result (m)	Wind	Notes	1	2	3	4
1	Dwight Phillips	United States (USA)	8.46	+0.8	CR	8.46 +0.8	X +2.4	X +1.3	8.33 +0.2
2	Miguel Pate	United States (USA)	8.30	+1.6		8.30 +1.6	7.94 +1.6	8.00 +0.5	X +0.9
3	James Beckford	Jamaica (JAM)	8.28	+0.3	SB	7.82 +1.1	8.20 +2.0	8.17 +2.0	8.28 +0.3
4	Ignisious Gaisah	Ghana (GHA)	8.23	+1.2		8.23 +1.2	8.11 +2.3	X +0.7	6.56 +1.5
5	Salim Sdiri	France (FRA)	8.05	+1.9		X +0.7	X +1.9	7.68 +0.1	8.05 +1.9
6	Tommi Evilä	Finland (FIN)	8.00	+1.6		8.00 +1.6	7.94 +2.0	X +2.2	7.94 +1.1
7	Volodymyr Zyuskov	Ukraine (UKR)	7.70	+1.3		X -0.1	X +2.8	7.70 +1.3	7.58 +0.6
8	Nils Winter	Germany (GER)	7.37w	+2.1		X +1.1	X +0.7	7.37 +2.1	7.32 +0.8

Women's
Rank	Athlete	Nation	Result (m)	Wind	Notes	1	2	3	4
1	Anju Bobby George	India (IND)	6.75	+0.5	SB	X +0.8	X +0.3	6.75 +0.5	X +0.9
2	Grace Upshaw	United States (USA)	6.67	+0.9		X +0.3	X +0.4	6.67 +0.9	6.43 +0.5
3	Eunice Barber	France (FRA)	6.51	+0.2		X 0.0	6.51 +0.2	6.47 +0.8	6.30 +1.0
4	Tatyana Lebedeva	Russia (RUS)	6.49	+1.1		6.46 +0.1	6.47 +0.4	6.49 +1.1	6.47 +0.9
5	Oksana Udmurtova	Russia (RUS)	6.48	+0.4		6.48 +0.4	6.42 +0.7	5.46 +0.3	6.44 +1.3
6	Irina Meleshina	Russia (RUS)	6.47	+1.1		X +0.8	X -0.1	X +1.4	6.47 +1.1
—	Tatyana Kotova	Russia (RUS)	6.83	+0.8	DQ	6.78 -0.2	X +0.3	6.69 +0.6	6.83 +0.8
—	Tianna Bartoletta	United States (USA)	—		DNS				

=== Triple jump ===
Men's
Rank	Athlete	Nation	Result (m)	Wind	Notes	1	2	3	4
1	Yoandris Betanzos	Cuba (CUB)	17.46	+0.1	SB	16.98 -0.1	17.21 +0.3	17.15 +0.4	17.46 +0.1
2	Jadel Gregório	Brazil (BRA)	17.32	+1.0		17.08 +0.0	17.32 +1.0	X +0.1	16.87 +0.3
3	Walter Davis	United States (USA)	17.23	0.0		16.73 -0.3	17.17 +0.9	17.23 +0.0	17.21 +0.3
4	Danil Burkenya	Russia (RUS)	17.10	0.0	SB	16.79 -0.2	X +0.3	16.93 +0.8	17.10 +0.0
5	Leevan Sands	Bahamas (BAH)	16.93	0.0		16.87 +0.3	X -0.1	X +0.0	16.93 +0.0
6	Nathan Douglas	Great Britain (GBR)	16.81	+0.4		16.81 +0.4	16.70 +0.0	16.72 +0.3	15.08 -0.2
7	Igor Spasovkhodskiy	Russia (RUS)	16.55	+0.1		15.45 +0.3	16.55 +0.1	X +0.8	–
8	Kenta Bell	United States (USA)	16.38	+0.1		16.03 -0.1	16.38 +0.1	X +0.5	16.32 +0.0

Women's
Rank	Athlete	Nation	Result (m)	Wind	Notes	1	2	3	4
1	Hrysopiyí Devetzí	Greece (GRE)	14.89	+1.7	SB	14.52 +1.4	14.89 +1.7	14.38 +0.4	14.37 +0.5
2	Tatyana Lebedeva	Russia (RUS)	14.86	+0.8		14.52 -0.4	14.70 +1.7	14.61 +1.1	14.86 +0.8
3	Yargelis Savigne	Cuba (CUB)	14.81	+1.5		14.50 +0.9	14.41 +1.5	14.59 +1.3	14.81 +1.5
4	Trecia Smith	Jamaica (JAM)	14.69	+0.4		X +1.1	14.69 +0.4	X +0.2	14.26 +1.0
5	Anna Pyatykh	Russia (RUS)	14.65	+0.8		14.42 +1.5	14.65 +0.8	X +1.5	X +0.3
6	Yamilé Aldama	Sudan (SUD)	14.26	+0.8		14.15 +1.0	X +1.1	14.26 +0.8	X +1.3
7	Magdelín Martínez	Italy (ITA)	14.24	+1.2		13.95 +1.4	14.24 +1.2	X -0.1	14.18 +1.3
8	Baya Rahouli	Algeria (ALG)	13.85	+0.9		13.85 +0.9	X +1.4	X -0.1	–

=== Shot put ===
Men's
Rank	Athlete	Nation	Result (m)	Notes	1	2	3	4
1	Adam Nelson	United States (USA)	21.92	CR	21.92	X	X	X
2	Joachim Olsen	Denmark (DEN)	21.03		20.50	X	21.03	20.85
3	Reese Hoffa	United States (USA)	20.87		19.50	19.79	20.75	20.87
4	Ralf Bartels	Germany (GER)	20.53		20.42	20.53	20.16	20.08
5	Christian Cantwell	United States (USA)	20.09		X	20.09	X	19.71
6	Mikuláš Konopka	Slovakia (SVK)	19.29		19.21	19.11	19.12	19.29
—	Andrei Mikhnevich	Belarus (BLR)	19.61	DQ	19.61	19.27	X	19.23
—	Yuriy Bilonoh	Ukraine (UKR)	20.04	DQ	X	20.04	20.01	X

Women's
Rank	Athlete	Nation	Result (m)	Notes	1	2	3	4
1	Valerie Adams	New Zealand (NZL)	19.55		19.24	19.55	19.31	X
2	Natallia Mikhnevich	Belarus (BLR)	18.80		18.80	X	X	X
3	Olga Ryabinkina	Russia (RUS)	18.64		18.12	18.64	X	X
4	Petra Lammert	Germany (GER)	18.49		18.28	18.23	18.49	17.97
5	Nadine Kleinert	Germany (GER)	18.46		17.87	18.46	18.20	18.45
6	Yumileidi Cumbá	Cuba (CUB)	18.44		X	X	18.36	18.44
—	Nadzeya Ostapchuk	Belarus (BLR)	20.44	DQ	19.55	X	X	20.44
—	Svetlana Krivelyova	Russia (RUS)	17.33	DQ	17.01	17.33	X	17.01

=== Discus throw ===
Men's
Rank	Athlete	Nation	Result (m)	Notes	1	2	3	4
1	Virgilijus Alekna	Lithuania (LTU)	67.64		64.59	67.16	X	67.64
2	Gerd Kanter	Estonia (EST)	66.01		X	63.00	X	66.01
3	Zoltán Kövágó	Hungary (HUN)	65.65		64.48	65.65	64.74	60.89
4	Aleksander Tammert	Estonia (EST)	65.22		X	59.15	65.22	64.46
5	Frantz Kruger	South Africa (RSA)	63.19		62.58	X	63.19	X
6	Mario Pestano	Spain (ESP)	62.97		62.76	62.18	62.36	62.97
7	Jason Tunks	Canada (CAN)	61.24		61.24	59.74	60.81	61.06
8	Michael Möllenbeck	Germany (GER)	59.27		58.53	X	59.27	X

Women's
Rank	Athlete	Nation	Result (m)	Notes	1	2	3	4
1	Natalya Sadova	Russia (RUS)	63.40		62.44	63.40	59.98	62.17
2	Franka Dietzsch	Germany (GER)	61.91		61.61	61.91	61.77	X
3	Aretha Thurmond	United States (USA)	60.68		57.48	58.25	60.68	56.79
4	Vera Pospíšilová-Cechlová	Czech Republic (CZE)	58.38		58.05	55.68	X	58.38
5	Nicoleta Grasu	Romania (ROU)	58.25		X	X	58.25	X
6	Wioletta Potepa	Poland (POL)	57.93		53.59	57.93	57.46	56.67
7	Olena Antonova	Ukraine (UKR)	56.57		54.12	56.54	X	56.57
8	Marzena Wysocka	Poland (POL)	55.08		53.68	55.08	X	53.15

=== Hammer throw ===
Men's
Rank	Athlete	Nation	Result (m)	Notes	1	2	3	4	5	6
1	Olli-Pekka Karjalainen	Finland (FIN)	79.81	SB	78.77	X	77.62	77.29	79.81	78.77
2	Vadim Devyatovskiy	Belarus (BLR)	78.98		76.98	78.31	78.02	78.62	78.98	X
3	Krisztián Pars	Hungary (HUN)	78.32		75.57	77.06	76.76	76.58	78.32	X
4	Szymon Ziólkowski	Poland (POL)	77.49		76.45	X	77.14	77.49	X	X
5	Libor Charfreitag	Slovakia (SVK)	76.59		X	69.90	72.98	75.91	76.56	76.59
6	Markus Esser	Germany (GER)	75.88		73.07	74.25	75.88	75.61	X	X
7	Ilya Konovalov	Russia (RUS)	72.66		70.87	72.66	72.64	72.62	X	72.50
—	Ivan Tsikhan	Belarus (BLR)	81.70	DQ	76.87	81.70	78.98	80.65	X	80.35

Women's
Rank	Athlete	Nation	Result (m)	Notes	1	2	3	4	5	6
1	Yipsi Moreno	Cuba (CUB)	74.75	CR	72.11	72.64	X	X	74.75	74.40
2	Kamila Skolimowska	Poland (POL)	72.73		X	67.01	72.73	71.41	X	X
3	Tatyana Beloborodova	Russia (RUS)	72.34		70.94	70.97	X	71.49	72.34	70.99
4	Ester Balassini	Italy (ITA)	70.63		66.99	70.63	70.33	67.08	69.42	68.24
5	Betty Heidler	Germany (GER)	69.95		66.80	X	66.84	X	67.28	69.95
6	Manuela Montebrun	France (FRA)	69.70		68.52	69.70	68.47	66.56	67.17	67.77
7	Volha Tsandzer	Belarus (BLR)	68.35		68.35	X	X	X	66.65	68.25
8	Noémi Németh	Hungary (HUN)	61.93		X	54.66	60.31	61.93	61.26	60.51
—	Olga Kuzenkova	Russia (RUS)	72.46	DQ	72.19	72.08	X	72.06	X	72.46

=== Javelin throw ===
Men's
Rank	Athlete	Nation	Result (m)	Notes	1	2	3	4
1	Tero Pitkämäki	Finland (FIN)	91.33	CR	83.54	91.33	85.14	87.66
2	Andreas Thorkildsen	Norway (NOR)	89.60	NR	83.30	81.58	89.60	85.54
3	Sergey Makarov	Russia (RUS)	86.69		84.85	86.50	84.85	86.69
4	Jan Zelezný	Czech Republic (CZE)	83.98	SB	80.04	78.94	83.98	83.71
5	Mark Frank	Germany (GER)	81.81		81.81	X	79.55	X
6	Eriks Rags	Latvia (LAT)	79.86		77.26	79.86	X	78.02
7	Aleksandr Ivanov	Russia (RUS)	78.32		X	76.15	74.02	78.32
8	Andrus Värnik	Estonia (EST)	76.11		76.11	X	X	X

Women's
Rank	Athlete	Nation	Result (m)	Notes	1	2	3	4
1	Olisdeilys Menéndez	Cuba (CUB)	67.24	CR	64.58	63.30	63.21	67.24
2	Steffi Nerius	Germany (GER)	66.35		63.27	63.53	66.35	X
3	Sonia Bisset	Cuba (CUB)	63.56		61.92	59.52	63.56	X
4	Lavern Eve	Bahamas (BAH)	61.96	SB	61.96	X	59.62	X
5	Barbora Špotáková	Czech Republic (CZE)	61.60		57.86	61.60	56.55	57.98
6	Christina Scherwin	Denmark (DEN)	60.19		58.36	X	60.19	55.12
7	Aggelikí Tsiolakoúdi	Greece (GRE)	58.42		58.42	54.31	54.52	54.43
8	Zahra Bani	Italy (ITA)	55.02		54.25	54.90	55.02	53.44
