= 2006 IAAF World Athletics Final – Results =

Results of the 2006 IAAF World Athletics Final

The 2006 IAAF World Athletics Final took place in at the Gottlieb-Daimler-Stadion in Stuttgart, Germany between September 9–10.

The year's top seven athletes, based on their points ranking of the 2006 IAAF World Athletics Tour, qualified to compete in each event, with an extra four athletes selected for races of 1500 metres and above. One additional athlete, a wildcard, was allocated to each event by the IAAF and replacement athletes were admitted to replace the qualified athletes that could not attend the final.

== Track ==
Key

Wild card athlete

Events
100 m	200 m	400 m	800 m	1500 m	3000 m	5000 m	110/100 m h	400 m h	3000 m st

=== 100 metres ===
Men's
Rank	Athlete	Nation	Time (sec)	Notes
1	Asafa Powell	Jamaica (JAM)	9.89	CR
2	Leonard Scott	United States (USA)	9.91	PB
3	Tyson Gay	United States (USA)	9.92	
4	Francis Obikwelu	Portugal (POR)	10.02	
5	Marcus Brunson	United States (USA)	10.04	
6	Ronald Pognon	France (FRA)	10.10	SB
7	Shawn Crawford	United States (USA)	10.13	
8	Marc Burns	Trinidad and Tobago (TRI)	10.24	

Women's
Rank	Athlete	Nation	Time (sec)	Notes
1	Sherone Simpson	Jamaica (JAM)	10.89	
2	Torri Edwards	United States (USA)	11.06	SB
3	Allyson Felix	United States (USA)	11.07	
4	Me'Lisa Barber	United States (USA)	11.10	
5	LoLo Jones	United States (USA)	11.24	PB
6	Stephanie Durst	United States (USA)	11.24	
7	Debbie Ferguson	Bahamas (BAH)	11.26	
8	Veronique Mang	France (FRA)	11.30	

=== 200 metres ===
Men's
Rank	Athlete	Nation	Time (sec)	Notes
1	Tyson Gay	United States (USA)	19.68	CR
2	Wallace Spearmon	United States (USA)	19.88	PB
3	Usain Bolt	Jamaica (JAM)	20.10	
4	Francis Obikwelu	Portugal (POR)	20.26	
5	Christopher Williams	Jamaica (JAM)	20.27	
6	Jaysuma Saidy Ndure	Gambia (GAM)	20.47	NR
7	Rodney Martin	United States (USA)	20.52	
8	Daniel Batman	Australia (AUS)	21.03	

Women's
Rank	Athlete	Nation	Time (sec)	Notes
1	Allyson Felix	United States (USA)	22.11	CR
2	Sanya Richards	United States (USA)	22.17	PB
3	Sherone Simpson	Jamaica (JAM)	22.22	
4	Debbie Ferguson	Bahamas (BAH)	22.58	
5	Stephanie Durst	United States (USA)	22.73	
6	Cydonie Mothersill	Cayman Islands (CAY)	22.89	
7	Kim Gevaert	Belgium (BEL)	22.93	
8	Fabienne Feraez	Benin (BEN)	23.21	

=== 400 metres ===
Men's
Rank	Athlete	Nation	Time (sec)	Notes
1	Jeremy Wariner	United States (USA)	44.02	CR
2	Gary Kikaya	DR Congo (COD)	44.10	AR
3	LaShawn Merritt	United States (USA)	44.14	PB
4	Andrew Rock	United States (USA)	44.69	
5	Michael Blackwood	Jamaica (JAM)	45.09	
6	Alleyne Francique	Grenada (GRN)	45.28	
7	Marc Raquil	France (FRA)	45.75	
8	Kamghe Gaba	Germany (GER)	45.96	

Women's
Rank	Athlete	Nation	Time (sec)	Notes
1	Sanya Richards	United States (USA)	49.25	CR
2	Novlene Williams	Jamaica (JAM)	50.36	
3	Shericka Williams	Jamaica (JAM)	50.44	
4	DeeDee Trotter	United States (USA)	50.58	
5	Christine Amertil	Bahamas (BAH)	50.79	
6	Amy Mbacké Thiam	Senegal (SEN)	51.16	
7	Monique Henderson	United States (USA)	51.30	
8	Vania Stambolova	Bulgaria (BUL)	51.48	

=== 800 metres ===
Men's
Rank	Athlete	Nation	Time (min)	Notes
1	Mbulaeni Mulaudzi	South Africa (RSA)	1:46.99	
2	Bram Som	Netherlands (NED)	1:47.10	
3	Wilfred Bungei	Kenya (KEN)	1:47.22	
4	William Yiampoy	Kenya (KEN)	1:47.34	
5	Khadevis Robinson	United States (USA)	1:47.37	
6	Youssef Saad Kamel	Bahrain (BHR)	1:47.62	
7	Amine Laalou	Morocco (MAR)	1:47.91	
8	Alfred Kirwa Yego	Kenya (KEN)	1:48.01	

Women's
Rank	Athlete	Nation	Time (min)	Notes
1	Zulia Calatayud	Cuba (CUB)	1:59.02	CR
2	Janeth Jepkosgei	Kenya (KEN)	1:59.10	
3	Hasna Benhassi	Morocco (MAR)	1:59.44	
4	Kenia Sinclair	Jamaica (JAM)	1:59.75	
5	Rebecca Lyne	Great Britain (GBR)	2:00.20	
6	Tetyana Petlyuk	Ukraine (UKR)	2:00.67	
7	Hazel Clark	United States (USA)	2:00.88	
8	Svetlana Cherkasova	Russia (RUS)	2:01.55	

=== 1500 metres ===
Men's
Rank	Athlete	Nation	Time (min)	Notes
1	Alex Kipchirchir	Kenya (KEN)	3:32.76	CR
2	Bernard Lagat	United States (USA)	3:32.93	
3	Augustine Kiprono Choge	Kenya (KEN)	3:33.37	
4	Mohamed Moustaoui	Morocco (MAR)	3:33.76	
5	Tarek Boukensa	Algeria (ALG)	3:33.87	
6	Ivan Heshko	Ukraine (UKR)	3:34.11	
7	Shadrack Korir	Kenya (KEN)	3:34.34	
8	Elkanah Onkware Angwenyi	Kenya (KEN)	3:34.37	
9	Kamal Boulahfane	Algeria (ALG)	3:34.58	
10	Daniel Kipchirchir Komen	Kenya (KEN)	3:34.77	
11	Abdalaati Iguider	Morocco (MAR)	3:35.88	
12	Adil Kaouch	Morocco (MAR)	3:44.57	

Women's
Rank	Athlete	Nation	Time (min)	Notes
1	Maryam Yusuf Jamal	Bahrain (BHR)	4:01.58	
2	Tatyana Tomashova	Russia (RUS)	4:03.26	
3	Yelena Soboleva	Russia (RUS)	4:03.49	
4	Sarah Jamieson	Australia (AUS)	4:04.32	
5	Yuliya Chizhenko	Russia (RUS)	4:06.07	
6	Lidia Chojecka	Poland (POL)	4:07.20	
7	Carmen Douma-Hussar	Canada (CAN)	4:08.67	
8	Hind Dehiba	France (FRA)	4:09.73	
9	Nouria Mérah-Benida	Algeria (ALG)	4:09.95	
10	Mestawat Tadesse	Ethiopia (ETH)	4:12.13	
11	Iryna Lishchynska	Ukraine (UKR)	4:14.18	
12	Olga Yegorova	Russia (RUS)	4:18.08	

=== 3000 metres ===
Men's
Rank	Athlete	Nation	Time (min)	Notes
1	Tariku Bekele	Ethiopia (ETH)	7:38.98	
2	Edwin Cheruiyot Soi	Kenya (KEN)	7:39.25	
3	Isaac Kiprono Songok	Kenya (KEN)	7:39.50	
4	Yusuf Kibet Biwott	Kenya (KEN)	7:40.03	
5	Shadrack Korir	Kenya (KEN)	7:40.05	
6	Boniface Kiprotich Songok	Kenya (KEN)	7:40.86	
7	Eliud Kipchoge	Kenya (KEN)	7:41.46	
8	Joseph Ebuya	Kenya (KEN)	7:43.31	
9	Hicham Bellani	Morocco (MAR)	7:47.21	
10	Mark Bett	Kenya (KEN)	7:50.55	
11	Khalid El Amri	Morocco (MAR)	7:50.76	
12	Mohammed Farah	Great Britain (GBR)	8:00.60	

Women's
Rank	Athlete	Nation	Time (min)	Notes
1	Meseret Defar	Ethiopia (ETH)	8:34.22	CR
2	Tirunesh Dibaba	Ethiopia (ETH)	8:34.74	
3	Vivian Cheruiyot	Kenya (KEN)	8:38.86	PB
4	Ines Chenonge	Kenya (KEN)	8:39.29	PB
5	Sylvia Chibiwott Kibet	Kenya (KEN)	8:40.09	PB
6	Gelete Burika Bati	Ethiopia (ETH)	8:41.22	
7	Joanne Pavey	Great Britain (GBR)	8:41.56	
8	Eloise Wellings	Australia (AUS)	8:46.17	PB
9	Krisztina Papp	Hungary (HUN)	8:48.54	
10	Lucy Wangui	Kenya (KEN)	8:56.41	PB
11	Susanne Wigene	Norway (NOR)	9:04.50	SB
12	Mariem Alaoui Selsouli	Morocco (MAR)	9:06.40	

=== 5000 metres ===
Men's
Rank	Athlete	Nation	Time (min)	Notes
1	Kenenisa Bekele	Ethiopia (ETH)	13:48.62	
2	Edwin Cheruiyot Soi	Kenya (KEN)	13:49.45	
3	Abreham Cherkos Feleke	Ethiopia (ETH)	13:49.66	
4	Tariku Bekele	Ethiopia (ETH)	13:50.03	
5	Boniface Kiprotich Songok	Kenya (KEN)	13:51.31	
6	Micah Kogo	Kenya (KEN)	13:52.51	
7	Mike Kipruto Kigen	Kenya (KEN)	13:55.22	
8	Boniface Kiprop	Uganda (UGA)	13:56.30	
9	Jonas Cheruiyot	Kenya (KEN)	14:01.13	
—	Eliud Kipchoge	Kenya (KEN)	DNS	

Women's
Rank	Athlete	Nation	Time (min)	Notes
1	Tirunesh Dibaba	Ethiopia (ETH)	16:04.77	
2	Meseret Defar	Ethiopia (ETH)	16:04.78	
3	Isabella Ochichi	Kenya (KEN)	16:07.39	
4	Ejegayehu Dibaba	Ethiopia (ETH)	16:07.87	
5	Vivian Cheruiyot	Kenya (KEN)	16:07.95	
6	Meselech Melkamu	Ethiopia (ETH)	16:08.03	
7	Edith Masai	Kenya (KEN)	16:08.56	
8	Mestawet Tufa	Ethiopia (ETH)	16:09.29	
9	Priscah Jepleting Ngetich	Kenya (KEN)	16:13.06	
10	Irene Kwambai Kipchumba	Kenya (KEN)	16:15.01	
—	Kim Smith	New Zealand (NZL)	DNS	

=== 110/100 metres hurdles ===
Men's
Rank	Athlete	Nation	Time (sec)	Notes
1	Liu Xiang	China (CHN)	12.93	CR
2	Dayron Robles	Cuba (CUB)	13.00	NR
3	Allen Johnson	United States (USA)	13.01	SB
4	Terrence Trammell	United States (USA)	13.22	
5	David Oliver	United States (USA)	13.24	
6	Aries Merritt	United States (USA)	13.25	
7	Stanislavs Olijars	Latvia (LAT)	13.27	
8	Thomas Blaschek	Germany (GER)	13.38	

Women's
Rank	Athlete	Nation	Time (sec)	Notes
1	Michelle Perry	United States (USA)	12.52	
2	Damu Cherry	United States (USA)	12.56	
3	Perdita Felicien	Canada (CAN)	12.58	SB
4	Susanna Kallur	Sweden (SWE)	12.59	
5	Brigitte Foster-Hylton	Jamaica (JAM)	12.66	
6	LoLo Jones	United States (USA)	12.76	
7	Danielle Carruthers	United States (USA)	12.89	
8	Kirsten Bolm	Germany (GER)	13.37	

=== 400 metres hurdles ===
Men's
Rank	Athlete	Nation	Time (sec)	Notes
1	Periklis Iakovakis	Greece (GRE)	47.92	
2	L.J. van Zyl	South Africa (RSA)	48.08	
3	Bershawn Jackson	United States (USA)	48.24	
4	James Carter	United States (USA)	48.41	
5	Kemel Thompson	Jamaica (JAM)	48.61	
6	Danny McFarlane	Jamaica (JAM)	48.73	
7	Naman Keïta	France (FRA)	49.40	
8	Alwyn Myburgh	South Africa (RSA)	49.47	

Women's
Rank	Athlete	Nation	Time (sec)	Notes
1	Lashinda Demus	United States (USA)	53.42	
2	Tiffany Ross-Williams	United States (USA)	54.22	
3	Tetiana Tereschuk-Antipova	Ukraine (UKR)	54.76	
4	Anna Jesień	Poland (POL)	55.16	
5	Tasha Danvers-Smith	Great Britain (GBR)	55.23	
6	Sandra Glover	United States (USA)	55.32	
7	Claudia Marx	Germany (GER)	55.98	
8	Sheena Johnson	United States (USA)	57.61	

=== 3000 metres steeplechase ===
Men's
Rank	Athlete	Nation	Time (min)	Notes
1	Paul Kipsiele Koech	Kenya (KEN)	8:01.37	
2	Richard Kipkemboi Mateelong	Kenya (KEN)	8:08.62	
3	Bouabdallah Tahri	France (FRA)	8:10.86	
4	Michael Kipyego	Kenya (KEN)	8:14.99	SB
5	Ezekiel Kemboi	Kenya (KEN)	8:18.01	
6	Brimin Kiprop Kipruto	Kenya (KEN)	8:20.05	
7	Luis Miguel Martín	Spain (ESP)	8:27.69	
8	Abdelkader Hachlaf	Morocco (MAR)	8:28.80	
9	Wesley Kiprotich	Kenya (KEN)	8:34.27	
10	Tareq Mubarak Taher	Bahrain (BHR)	8:42.31	
—	César Pérez	Spain (ESP)	DNF	

Women's
Rank	Athlete	Nation	Time (min)	Notes
1	Alesia Turava	Belarus (BLR)	9:27.08	
2	Jeruto Kiptum	Kenya (KEN)	9:28.60	
3	Salome Chepchumba	Kenya (KEN)	9:29.58	
4	Gladys Jerotich Kipkemoi	Kenya (KEN)	9:37.57	
5	Cristina Casandra	Romania (ROM)	9:40.47	
6	Wioletta Janowska	Poland (POL)	9:45.01	
7	Victoria Mitchell	Australia (AUS)	9:47.63	
8	Roisin McGettigan	Ireland (IRL)	9:52.85	
9	Carrie Messner	United States (USA)	10:04.72	
—	Lyubov Ivanova	Russia (RUS)	DQ	

== Field ==
Events
High jump	Pole vault	Long jump	Triple jump	Shot put	Discus	Hammer	Javelin

=== High jump ===
Men's
Rank	Athlete	Nation	Result (m)	Notes
1	Linus Thörnblad	Sweden (SWE)	2.33	
2	Andrey Silnov	Russia (RUS)	2.33	
3	Stefan Holm	Sweden (SWE)	2.29	
3	Yaroslav Rybakov	Russia (RUS)	2.29	
5	Ivan Ukhov	Russia (RUS)	2.25	
6	Svatoslav Ton	Czech Republic (CZE)	2.25	
7	Tomás Janku	Czech Republic (CZE)	2.25	
8	Jesse Williams	United States (USA)	2.20	

Women's
Rank	Athlete	Nation	Result (m)	Notes
1	Kajsa Bergqvist	Sweden (SWE)	1.98	
2	Tia Hellebaut	Belgium (BEL)	1.98	
3	Venelina Veneva	Bulgaria (BUL)	1.98	
4	Yelena Slesarenko	Russia (RUS)	1.94	
5	Amy Acuff	United States (USA)	1.94	
6	Ruth Beitia	Spain (ESP)	1.90	
6	Anna Chicherova	Russia (RUS)	1.90	
6	Blanka Vlašić	Croatia (CRO)	1.90	

=== Pole vault ===
Men's
Rank	Athlete	Nation	Result (m)	Notes
1	Paul Burgess	Australia (AUS)	5.82	
2	Toby Stevenson	United States (USA)	5.82	SB
2	Tim Lobinger	Germany (GER)	5.82	
4	Fabian Schulze	Germany (GER)	5.75	
5	Steven Hooker	Australia (AUS)	5.75	
6	Daichi Sawano	Japan (JPN)	5.65	
7	Brad Walker	United States (USA)	5.65	
8	Lars Börgeling	Germany (GER)	5.50	

Women's
Rank	Athlete	Nation	Result (m)	Notes
1	Yelena Isinbaeva	Russia (RUS)	4.75	
2	Monika Pyrek	Poland (POL)	4.65	
3	Jennifer Stuczynski	United States (USA)	4.60	
4	Tatiana Grigorieva	Australia (AUS)	4.50	
5	Fabiana Murer	Brazil (BRA)	4.50	
6	Silke Spiegelburg	Germany (GER)	4.50	
7	Kym Howe	Australia (AUS)	4.50	
8	Nastja Ryjikh	Germany (GER)	4.40	

=== Long jump ===
Men's
Rank	Athlete	Nation	Result (m)	Notes
1	Irving Saladino	Panama (PAN)	8.41	
2	Mohamed Salman Al Khuwalidi	Saudi Arabia (KSA)	8.34	
3	Louis Tsatoumas	Greece (GRE)	8.29	
4	Ignisious Gaisah	Ghana (GHA)	8.26	
5	Miguel Pate	United States (USA)	8.26	
6	Dwight Phillips	United States (USA)	8.09	
7	James Beckford	Jamaica (JAM)	7.83	
8	Issam Nima	Algeria (ALG)	7.73	

Women's
Rank	Athlete	Nation	Result (m)	Notes
1	Tatyana Lebedeva	Russia (RUS)	6.92	
2	Bronwyn Thompson	Australia (AUS)	6.77	
3	Rose Richmond	United States (USA)	6.75	
4	Tatyana Kotova	Russia (RUS)	6.64	
5	Oksana Udmurtova	Russia (RUS)	6.63	
6	Grace Upshaw	United States (USA)	6.53	
7	Brianna Glenn	United States (USA)	6.43	
8	Kelly Sotherton	Great Britain (GBR)	5.85	

=== Triple jump ===
Men's
Rank	Athlete	Nation	Result (m)	Notes
1	Yoandri Betanzos	Cuba (CUB)	17.29	
2	Jadel Gregório	Brazil (BRA)	17.12	
3	Walter Davis	United States (USA)	16.98	
4	Alexander Martínez	Switzerland (SUI)	16.91	
5	Julien Kapek	France (FRA)	16.85	
6	Aarik Wilson	United States (USA)	16.78	
7	Randy Lewis	Grenada (GRN)	16.72	
8	Marian Oprea	Romania (ROM)	16.54	

Women's
Rank	Athlete	Nation	Result (m)	Notes
1	Tatyana Lebedeva	Russia (RUS)	14.82	
2	Hrysopiyi Devetzi	Greece (GRE)	14.67	
3	Yamilé Aldama	Sudan (SUD)	14.67	
4	Anna Pyatykh	Russia (RUS)	14.60	
5	Marija Šestak	Slovenia (SLO)	14.32	
6	Olha Saladuha	Ukraine (UKR)	14.04	
7	Natallia Safronava	Belarus (BLR)	13.88	
—	Trecia Smith	Jamaica (JAM)	NM	

=== Shot put ===
Men's
Rank	Athlete	Nation	Result (m)	Notes
1	Reese Hoffa	United States (USA)	21.05	
2	Christian Cantwell	United States (USA)	20.94	
3	Rutger Smith	Netherlands (NED)	20.74	
4	Dan Taylor	United States (USA)	20.50	
5	Scott Martin	Australia (AUS)	20.38	PB
6	Ralf Bartels	Germany (GER)	20.19	
7	Tomasz Majewski	Poland (POL)	20.13	
8	Manuel Martínez Gutiérrez	Spain (ESP)	19.79	

Women's
Rank	Athlete	Nation	Result (m)	Notes
1	Natallia Khoroneko	Belarus (BLR)	19.81	
2	Valerie Vili	New Zealand (NZL)	19.64	
3	Yumileidi Cumbá	Cuba (CUB)	18.78	
4	Petra Lammert	Germany (GER)	18.67	
5	Nadine Kleinert	Germany (GER)	18.18	
6	Kristin Heaston	United States (USA)	17.51	
-	Nadzeya Ostapchuk	Belarus (BLR)	19.50	DQ

- Ostapchuk, originally third, was retrospectively disqualified due to a failed doping test.

=== Discus throw ===
Men's
Rank	Athlete	Nation	Result (m)	Notes
1	Virgilijus Alekna	Lithuania (LTU)	68.63	CR
2	Gerd Kanter	Estonia (EST)	68.47	
3	Aleksander Tammert	Estonia (EST)	64.94	
4	Ian Waltz	United States (USA)	62.94	
5	Jarred Rome	United States (USA)	62.80	
6	Piotr Małachowski	Poland (POL)	62.50	
7	Michael Möllenbeck	Germany (GER)	61.75	
—	Zoltán Kővágó	Hungary (HUN)	NM	

Women's
Rank	Athlete	Nation	Result (m)	Notes
1	Franka Dietzsch	Germany (GER)	64.73	
2	Nicoleta Grasu	Romania (ROM)	62.32	
3	Anna Söderberg	Sweden (SWE)	61.50	
4	Ellina Zvereva	Belarus (BLR)	60.91	
5	Aretha Thurmond	United States (USA)	60.61	
6	Wioletta Potepa	Poland (POL)	60.12	
7	Suzanne Powell	United States (USA)	59.44	
8	Věra Pospíšilová-Cechlová	Czech Republic (CZE)	58.28	

=== Hammer throw ===
Men's
Rank	Athlete	Nation	Result (m)	Notes
1	Koji Murofushi	Japan (JPN)	81.42	
2	Ivan Tsikhan	Belarus (BLR)	81.12	SB
3	Krisztián Pars	Hungary (HUN)	80.41	
4	Markus Esser	Germany (GER)	79.19	
5	Vadim Devyatovskiy	Belarus (BLR)	78.67	
6	Olli-Pekka Karjalainen	Finland (FIN)	78.47	
7	Szymon Ziólkowski	Poland (POL)	77.44	
8	Primož Kozmus	Slovenia (SLO)	76.39	

Women's
Rank	Athlete	Nation	Result (m)	Notes
1	Betty Heidler	Germany (GER)	75.44	CR
2	Kamila Skolimowska	Poland (POL)	73.33	
3	Yipsi Moreno	Cuba (CUB)	71.85	
4	Ivana Brkljacic	Croatia (CRO)	66.90	
5	Clarissa Claretti	Italy (ITA)	66.87	
6	Ester Balassini	Italy (ITA)	66.66	
7	Kathrin Klaas	Germany (GER)	66.38	
8	Erin Gilreath	United States (USA)	63.45	

=== Javelin throw ===
Men's
Rank	Athlete	Nation	Result (m)	Notes
1	Andreas Thorkildsen	Norway (NOR)	89.50	
2	Tero Pitkämäki	Finland (FIN)	88.25	
3	Peter Esenwein	Germany (GER)	85.30	SB
4	Vadims Vasilevskis	Latvia (LAT)	83.26	
5	Ainars Kovals	Latvia (LAT)	82.32	
6	Jan Zelezny	Czech Republic (CZE)	81.61	
7	Eriks Rags	Latvia (LAT)	81.42	
8	Stefan Wenk	Germany (GER)	76.34	

Women's
Rank	Athlete	Nation	Result (m)	Notes
1	Barbora Špotáková	Czech Republic (CZE)	66.21	NR
2	Steffi Nerius	Germany (GER)	65.06	
3	Christina Scherwin	Denmark (DEN)	64.83	NR
4	Sonia Bisset	Cuba (CUB)	62.16	
5	Christina Obergföll	Germany (GER)	60.63	
6	Zahra Bani	Italy (ITA)	60.54	
7	Barbara Madejczyk	Poland (POL)	57.87	
8	Felicia Tilea-Moldovan	Romania (ROM)	55.69	
