= 2005 World Championships in Athletics – Women's 3000 metres steeplechase =

The Women's 3,000 metres Steeplechase event at the 2005 World Championships in Athletics was held on August 6 and August 8 at the Helsinki Olympic Stadium. It was the first women's steeplechase to be held at the World Championships. The first three of each heat (Q) plus the six fastest times (q) qualified for the final.

== Medalists ==
Gold	Docus Inzikuru; Uganda (UGA)
Silver	Yekaterina Volkova; Russia (RUS)
Bronze	Jeruto Kiptum; Kenya (KEN)

== Schedule ==
- All times are Eastern European Time (UTC+2)

Qualification Round
Heat 1	Heat 2	Heat 3
06.08.2005 – 12:05h	06.08.2005 – 12:18h	06.08.2005 – 12:31h
Final
08.08.2005 – 20:35h

== Abbreviations ==
- All results shown are in minutes

Q	automatic qualification
q	qualification by rank
DNS	did not start
NM	no mark
WR	world record
AR	area record
NR	national record
PB	personal best
SB	season best

== Startlist ==
No.	Heat 1	SB	PB
361	Roisin McGettigan (IRL)	9:46.12	9:28.29
572	Clarisse Cruz (POR)	9:47.90	9:47.90
353	Lívia Tóth (HUN)	9:30.20	9:30.20
424	Minori Hayakari (JPN)	9:41.21	9:38.68
793	Lisa Galaviz (USA)	9:40.58	9:28.75
675	Yelena Zadorozhnaya (RUS)	9:32.41	9:32.41
448	Salome Chepchumba (KEN)	9:31.44	9:26.07
485	Bouchra Chaâbi (MAR)	9:41.82	9:30.35
404	Korene Hinds (JAM)	9:30.12	9:28.86
509	Miranda Boonstra (NED)	9:51.30	9:45.87
15	Andrea Mayr (AUT)	9:56.78	9:48.87
35	Stephanie de Croock (BEL)	9:48.65	9:41.79
No.	Heat 2	SB	PB
193	Rosa Morató (ESP)	9:54.20	9:26.23
712	Ida Nilsson (SWE)	9:48.85	9:39.24
460	Jackline Chemwok (KEN)	9:45.70	9:45.70
550	Wioletta Janowska (POL)	9:25.09	9:17.15
405	Mardrea Hyman (JAM)	9:27.21	9:27.21
256	Élodie Olivarès (FRA)	9:40.47	9:33.12
636	Nataliya Izmodenova (RUS)	9:35.51	9:35.51
2	Fatiha Bahi Azzouhoum (ALG)	9:38.31	9:38.31
812	Carrie Messner (USA)	9:39.68	9:39.68
235	Anni Tuimala (FIN)	10:17.56	10:07.41
479	Rasa Troup (LTU)	9:47.47	9:47.47
86	Dobrinka Shalamanova (BUL)	9:56.75	9:42.08
No.	Heat 2	SB	PB
452	Jeruto Kiptum (KEN)	9:26.95	9:23.35
735	Türkan Bozkurt (TUR)	9:50.32	9:46.12
239	Yamina Bouchaouante (FRA)	9:42.18	9:42.18
737	Docus Inzikuru (UGA)	9:15.04	9:15.04
588	Cristina Casandra (ROU)	9:35.95	9:28.53
577	Inês Monteiro (POR)	9:39.20	9:39.20
670	Yekaterina Volkova (RUS)	9:20.49	9:06.57
734	Habiba Ghribi (TUN)	9:51.49	9:50.04
801	Elizabeth Jackson (USA)	9:39.78	9:39.78
746	Valentyna Horpynych (UKR)	9:49.73	9:43.48
262	Jo Ankier (GBR)	9:50.10	9:50.10

== Results ==
=== Heat 1 ===
Rank	Athlete	Time	Note
1	Yelena Zadorozhnaya (RUS)	9:32.96	CR
2	Korene Hinds (JAM)	9:36.76	
3	Salome Chepchumba (KEN)	9:39.27	
4	Minori Hayakari (JPN)	9:41.21	AR
5	Bouchra Chaâbi (MAR)	9:41.82	SB
6	Lisa Galaviz (USA)	9:47.45	
7	Lívia Tóth (HUN)	9:51.03	
8	Stephanie de Croock (BEL)	9:54.78	
9	Roisin McGettigan (IRL)	9:56.31	
10	Clarisse Cruz (POR)	10:06.96	
11	Andrea Mayr (AUT)	10:07.61	
12	Miranda Boonstra (NED)	10:09.91	

=== Heat 2 ===
Rank	Athlete	Time	Note
1	Wioletta Janowska (POL)	9:35.66	
2	Mardrea Hyman (JAM)	9:38.75	
3	Carrie Messner (USA)	9:39.68	PB
4	Jackline Chemwok (KEN)	9:47.37	
5	Rasa Troup (LTU)	9:47.47	NR
6	Élodie Olivarès (FRA)	9:49.28	
7	Ida Nilsson (SWE)	9:56.17	
8	Nataliya Izmodenova (RUS)	10:01.97	
9	Rosa Morató (ESP)	10:07.09	
10	Fatiha Bahi Azzouhoum (ALG)	10:07.39	
11	Dobrinka Shalamanova (BUL)	10:07.75	
—	Anni Tuimala (FIN)	DNF	

=== Heat 3 ===
Rank	Athlete	Time	Note
1	Docus Inzikuru (UGA)	9:27.85	CR
2	Jeruto Kiptum (KEN)	9:29.21	NR
3	Yekaterina Volkova (RUS)	9:29.88	PB
4	Cristina Casandra (ROM)	9:37.19	
5	Yamina Bouchaouante (FRA)	9:42.18	PB
6	Elizabeth Jackson (USA)	9:45.24	
7	Inês Monteiro (POR)	9:47.19	
8	Habiba Ghribi (TUN)	9:51.49	NR
9	Türkan Bozkurt (TUR)	9:56.61	
10	Valentyna Horpynych (UKR)	9:59.29	
11	Jo Ankier (GBR)	10:12.50	

=== Final ===
Rank	Athlete	Time	Note
1st place, gold medalist(s)	Docus Inzikuru (UGA)	9:18.24	CR
2nd place, silver medalist(s)	Yekaterina Volkova (RUS)	9:20.49	PB
3rd place, bronze medalist(s)	Jeruto Kiptum (KEN)	9:26.95	NR
4	Korene Hinds (JAM)	9:33.30	NR
5	Salome Chepchumba (KEN)	9:37.39	
6	Yelena Zadorozhnaya (RUS)	9:37.91	
7	Cristina Casandra (ROM)	9:39.52	
8	Mardrea Hyman (JAM)	9:39.66	
9	Elizabeth Jackson (USA)	9:46.72	
10	Bouchra Chaâbi (MAR)	9:47.62	
11	Yamina Bouchaouante (FRA)	9:48.48	
12	Minori Hayakari (JPN)	9:48.97	
13	Inês Monteiro (POR)	9:50.35	
14	Wioletta Janowska (POL)	10:00.03	
15	Carrie Messner (USA)	10:11.20	
