= Elizabeth Jackson (runner) =

American track and field athlete

Personal information
- Born: October 27, 1977 (age 48) Salt Lake City, Utah
- Height: 5 ft 7 in (1.70 m)

Sport
- Sport: Athletics
- Event: 3000 m steeplechase
- College team: BYU Cougars
- Retired: 2005

Achievements and titles
- World finals: 2005: 9th
- National finals: 4-time champion
- Personal best: 3000 m steeplechase: 9:39.78 (2005)

Elizabeth Jackson (born October 27, 1977) is an American female former track and field athlete who specialized in the 3000 meters steeplechase. She represented her country at the 2005 World Championships in Athletics, placing ninth in the final. She was a four-time American national champion in the steeplechase, winning in 1999, 2000, 2002 and 2005. She also competed at the 1998 and 2001 Goodwill Games. She broke the United States record in the steeplechase several times.

Born in Salt Lake City, Jackson attended East High School and took part in track there, taking state-level titles in 800 meters and mile run. She competed collegiately for Brigham Young University's BYU Cougars team while studying for a business marketing major. She earned six All-American honors in track and cross country while there, as well as Academic All-America selection. She was the first ever winner of the NCAA women's steeplechase. She placed third in the 5000 metres at the 2000 NCAA Indoor Championships.

She stopped competing at elite level after 2005 and in 2009 set up her own search engine optimisation company.

== International competitions ==
Year	Competition	Venue	Position	Event	Notes
1998	Goodwill Games	Uniondale, United States	8th	3000 m steeplechase	10:45.97
2001	Goodwill Games	Brisbane, Australia	4th	3000 m steeplechase	9:41.94
2005	World Championships	Helsinki, Finland	9th	3000 m steeplechase	9:46.72
2005	World Athletics Final	Monte Carlo, Monaco	8th	3000 m steeplechase	9:46.10

== National titles ==
- USA Outdoor Track and Field Championships
  - 3000 m steeplechase: 1999, 2000, 2002
- NCAA Women's Division I Outdoor Track and Field Championships
  - 3000 m steeplechase: 2001
