= Oksana Udmurtova =

Russian long and triple jumper (born 1982)

Medal record

Women's athletics

Representing Russia

European Championships
Bronze medal – third place	2006 Gothenburg	Long jump

Oksana Pavlovna Udmurtova (Russian: Оксана Павловна Удмуртова) (born 1 February 1982) is a Russian track and field athlete specialising in the long jump. She is from the Volgograd region of Russia and she is part of the Russian Army Athletics Club where she is coached by Viacheslav Dogonkin and Yu Malkov. She recently had success at the 2006 European Athletics Championships where she took the bronze medal.

She first competed on the world stage at the 2005 World Championships in Athletics, when she finished sixth. For the 2006 season she placed 95 in the IAAF World Rankings.

== International competitions ==
Representing Russia
Year	Competition	Venue	Position	Event	Result	Notes
2005	World Championships	Helsinki, Finland	5th	Long jump	6.53 m	Originally 6th before Tatyana Kotova DQ
2005	World Athletics Final	Monaco, Monaco	6th	Long jump	6.48 m	
2006	World Indoor Championships	Moscow, Russia	7th	Long jump	6.50 m	
2006	European Championships	Gothenburg, Sweden	3rd	Long jump	6.69 m	
2006	World Athletics Final	Stuttgart, Germany	5th	Long jump	6.63 m	
2007	European Indoor Championships	Birmingham, United Kingdom	4th	Triple jump	14.41 m	SB
2007	World Athletics Final	Stuttgart, Germany	3rd	Long jump	6.52 m	
2008	Olympic Games	Beijing, China	6th	Long jump	6.70 m	
2008	World Athletics Final	Stuttgart, Germany	5th	Long jump	6.46 m	

== Personal bests ==
Event	Best	Date	Venue
Long jump	7.02 m	16 May 2006	Doha, Qatar
Triple jump	14.41 m	4 March 2007	Birmingham, United Kingdom
4 × 100 m relay	45.28	12 June 2005	Villeneuve-d'Ascq, France

== See also ==
- List of European Athletics Championships medalists (women)
