= Athletics at the 2008 Summer Olympics – Women's 3000 metres steeplechase =

Women's 3000 metres steeplechase at the Games of the XXIX Olympiad
- Venue: Beijing National Stadium
- Dates: 15 August 2008 (heats); 17 August 2008 (final)
- Competitors: 50 from 30 nations
- Winning time: 8:58.81 WR

Medalists
1st place, gold medalist(s)		Gulnara Samitova-Galkina	Russia
2nd place, silver medalist(s)		Eunice Jepkorir	Kenya
3rd place, bronze medalist(s)		Tatyana Petrova Arkhipova	Russia

Official Video Highlights

The women's 3000 metres steeplechase at the 2008 Summer Olympics occurred on 15–17 August at the Beijing National Stadium, the first time this event had ever been held at the Olympics.

The qualifying standards were 9:46.00 (A standard) and 9:55.00 (B standard).

In the Final, Gulnara Samitova-Galkina of Russia won by 8.60 seconds, with a new world record of 8:58.81. She was the first woman to break the nine-minute barrier for this event.

Bronze medalist Yekaterina Volkova of Russia tested positive for dehydrochlormethyltestosterone (turinabol) and was disqualified.

== Schedule ==
All times are China Standard Time (UTC+8)

Date	Time	Round
Friday, August 15, 2008	20:25-21:00	Heats
Sunday, August 17, 2008	21:30-21:40	Final

== Records ==
Prior to this competition, the existing world and Olympic records were as follows:

World record	Gulnara Samitova-Galkina (RUS)	9:01.59	Heraklion, Greece	4 July 2004
Olympic record	Inaugural Event			

The following new world and Olympic records were set during this competition.

Date	Event	Name	Nationality	Time	OR	WR
17 August	Final	Gulnara Samitova-Galkina	Russia	8:58.81	OR	WR

== Results ==
=== Round 1 ===
Qualification: First 4 in each heat(Q) and the next 3 fastest(q) advance to the Final.

(WR - World Record, NR - National Record, AR - Area Record, PB - Personal Best, SB - Season Best)

Rank	Heat	Name	Nationality	Time	Notes
1	1	Gulnara Galkina-Samitova	Russia	9:15.17	Q
2	1	Ruth Bisibori Nyangau	Kenya	9:19.75	Q
3	3	Eunice Jepkorir	Kenya	9:21.31	Q
4	1	Wioletta Frankiewicz	Poland	9:21.88	Q, SB
5	3	Marta Domínguez	Spain	9:22.11	Q
6	1	Cristina Casandra	Romania	9:22.38	Q, NR
7	3	Yekaterina Volkova	Russia	~~9:23.06~~	DSQ
8	1	Habiba Ghribi	Tunisia	9:25.50	q, NR
9	3	Zemzem Ahmed	Ethiopia	9:25.63	Q, PB
10	3	Elena Romagnolo	Italy	9:27.48	q, NR
11	3	Anna Willard	United States	9:28.52	q
12	2	Tatyana Petrova	Russia	9:28.85	Q
13	2	Roisin McGettigan	Ireland	9:28.92	Q, SB
14	1	Helen Clitheroe	Great Britain	9:29.14	NR
15	2	Jennifer Barringer	United States	9:29.20	Q
16	2	Zulema Fuentes-Pila	Spain	9:29.40	Q, PB
17	1	Zhu Yanmei	China	9:29.63	PB
18	3	Antje Möldner	Germany	9:29.86	NR
19	3	Rasa Troup	Lithuania	9:30.21	NR
20	2	Jessica Augusto	Portugal	9:30.23	
21	3	Donna MacFarlane	Australia	9:32.05	
22	3	Sara Moreira	Portugal	9:34.39	
23	2	Ancuţa Bobocel	Romania	9:35.31	
24	1	Lindsey Anderson	United States	9:36.81	
25	2	Sophie Duarte	France	9:38.08	
26	1	Mekdes Bekele	Ethiopia	9:41.43	
27	1	Fionnuala Britton	Ireland	9:43.57	SB
28	1	Valentyna Horpynych	Ukraine	9:43.95	
29	1	Rosa Morató	Spain	9:45.33	
30	2	Sofia Assefa	Ethiopia	9:47.02	
30	3	Katarzyna Kowalska	Poland	9:47.02	
32	1	Victoria Mitchell	Australia	9:47.88	
33	1	Türkan Erismis	Turkey	9:48.54	
34	1	Clarisse Cruz	Portugal	9:49.45	
35	1	Minori Hayakari	Japan	9:49.70	
36	3	Barbara Parker	Great Britain	9:51.93	
37	1	Widad Mendil	Algeria	9:52.35	
38	2	Muna Durka	Sudan	9:53.09	
39	2	Veerle Dejaeghere	Belgium	9:54.65	
40	2	Hanane Ouhaddou	Morocco	9:56.41	
41	2	Veronica Nyaruai	Kenya	10:01.69	
42	3	Li Zhenzhu	China	10:04.05	
43	2	Oxana Juravel	Moldova	10:04.38	
44	2	Aslı Çakır	Turkey	10:05.76	
45	3	Inna Poluškina	Latvia	10:18.60	
46	2	Irini Kokkinariou	Greece	10:22.39	
47	2	Zhao Yanni	China	10:36.77	
	3	Korene Hinds	Jamaica	DNF	
	2	Mardrea Hyman	Jamaica	DNF	
	3	Dobrinka Shalamanova	Bulgaria	DNF	
	2	Zenaide Vieira	Brazil	DNF	

== Final ==
Rank	Name	Nationality	Time	Notes
1st place, gold medalist(s)	Gulnara Samitova-Galkina	Russia	8:58.81	WR
2nd place, silver medalist(s)	Eunice Jepkorir	Kenya	9:07.41	AR
DSQ	Yekaterina Volkova	Russia	~~9:07.64~~	DSQ
3rd place, bronze medalist(s)	Tatyana Petrova	Russia	9:12.33	SB
4	Cristina Casandra	Romania	9:16.85	NR
5	Ruth Bisibori Nyangau	Kenya	9:17.35	PB
6	Zemzem Ahmed	Ethiopia	9:17.85	NR
7	Wioletta Frankiewicz	Poland	9:21.76	SB
8	Jennifer Barringer	United States	9:22.26	AR
9	Anna Willard	United States	9:25.63	
10	Elena Romagnolo	Italy	9:30.04	
11	Zulema Fuentes-Pila	Spain	9:35.16	PB
12	Habiba Ghribi	Tunisia	9:36.43	
13	Roisin McGettigan	Ireland	9:55.89	
—	Marta Domínguez	Spain	DNF	

=== Splits ===
Intermediate	Athlete	Country	Mark
1000m	Gulnara Samitova-Galkina	Russia	2:58.63
2000m	Gulnara Samitova-Galkina	Russia	6:01.20
