= Boniface Songok =

Kenyan middle distance runner (born 1980)

Medal record

Men's athletics

Representing Kenya

African Championships
Silver medal – second place	2004 Brazzaville	5000 m

Boniface Kiprotich Songok (born 25 December 1980) is a Kenyan middle-distance runner who specializes in the 3000 and 5000 metres.

His personal best over 3000 m of 7:30.62 minutes, achieved in 2004, was the third best time in the world that season, only behind Eliud Kipchoge and James Kwalia.

He is based at the PACE Sports Management training camp in Kaptagat.

== International competitions ==
Year	Competition	Venue	Position	Event	Notes
2004	African Championships	Brazzaville, Congo	2nd	5000 m	
2004	World Athletics Final	Monte Carlo, Monaco	5th	3000 m	
2005	World Athletics Final	Monte Carlo, Monaco	7th	3000 m	
2005	World Athletics Final	Monte Carlo, Monaco	7th	5000 m	
2006	World Athletics Final	Stuttgart, Germany	6th	3000 m	
2006	World Athletics Final	Stuttgart, Germany	5th	5000 m	

== Personal bests ==
- 3000 metres - 7:30.62 min (2004)
- 5000 metres - 12:55.85 min (2005)
