= Lisa Aguilera =

American former track and field athlete

Personal information
- Born: October 30, 1979 (age 46) Phoenix, Arizona
- Height: 5 ft 3 in (1.60 m)
- Weight: 115 lb (52 kg)

Sport
- Sport: Athletics
- Event: 3000 m steeplechase
- College team: Arizona State Sun Devils
- Coached by: Wynn Gmitroski, Louie Quintana, Walt Drenth
- Retired: 2012

Achievements and titles
- World finals: 2005
- Personal best: 3000 m steeplechase: 9:24.84 (2010)

Lisa Aguilera (born 30 November 1979) is an American former track and field athlete who specialized in the 3000 meters steeplechase. She represented her country at the 2005 World Championships in Athletics. the 2006 IAAF World Cup and the 2010 IAAF Continental Cup. She was a two-time national champion in the steeplechase at the USA Outdoor Track and Field Championships.

Born in Phoenix, Arizona to parents Ruben and Chris, Aguilera attended Centennial High School before going to Arizona State University to study computer engineering and finance. She competed collegiately for the Arizona State Sun Devils, having previously won eight state-level titles in track and field while at high school. While at Arizona State she won All-America honors in cross country, indoor track and outdoor track, as well making the Academic All-America selection in cross country. Her fifth-place finish at the NCAA Women's Division I Cross Country Championship was the highest ever placing for the school.

She married Anthony Galaviz in the early 2000s and competed under the name Lisa Galaviz during this period before reverting to her maiden name. She set an American record in the steeplechase at the 2007 KBC Night of Athletics, setting a time of 9:28.75 minutes.

She ceased competing after 2012, after a fifth-place finish at the 2012 United States Olympic Trials.

== Personal records ==
- 800 meters – 2:08.15 (2011)
- 1500 meters – 4:16.77 (2010)
- 3000 meters – 9:02.70 (2009)
- 5000 meters – 15:53.28 (17)
- 2000 meters steeplechase – 6:26.72 (2007)
- 3000 meters steeplechase – 9:24.84 (2010)
- 5K run – 16:33 (2009)
- 10K run – 35:17 (2004)
- Half marathon – 1:20:28 (2005)

== International competitions ==
Year	Competition	Venue	Position	Event	Notes
2005	World Championships	Helsinki, Finland	6th (heats)	3000 m steeplechase	9:47.45
2005	World Athletics Final	Monte Carlo, Monaco	12th	3000 m steeplechase	10:05.01
2006	World Cup	Athens, Greece	7th	3000 m steeplechase	9:49.32
2007	World Athletics Final	Stuttgart, Germany	10th	3000 m steeplechase	9:51.73
2009	World Athletics Final	Thessaloniki, Greece	7th	3000 m steeplechase	9:33.11
2010	Continental Cup	Split, Croatia	5th	3000 m steeplechase	9:41.48

== National titles ==
- USA Outdoor Track and Field Championships
  - 3000 m steeplechase: 2006, 2010
