= Athletics at the 2005 Summer Universiade – Women's 3000 metres steeplechase =

The women's 3000 metres steeplechase event at the 2005 Summer Universiade was held on 17 August in İzmir, Turkey. It was the first time that this event was contested at the Universiade.

== Results ==
Rank	Athlete	Nationality	Time	Notes
1st place, gold medalist(s)	Lívia Tóth	Hungary	9:40.37	GR
2nd place, silver medalist(s)	Victoria Mitchell	Australia	9:47.54	SB
3rd place, bronze medalist(s)	Türkan Erişmiş	Turkey	9:50.32	NR
4	Valentyna Horpynych	Ukraine	10:03.31	
5	Tebogo Masehla	South Africa	10:06.05	NR
6	Roisin McGettigan	Ireland	10:07.58	
7	Dobrinka Shalamanova	Bulgaria	10:08.03	
8	Fiona Crombie	New Zealand	10:08.42	
9	Agnes Tschurtschenthaler	Italy	10:12.54	
10	Nolene Conrad	South Africa	10:23.89	
11	Fionnuala Britton	Ireland	10:28.37	
12	Dina Malheiro	Portugal	10:30.46	
13	Anastasia Gerassimova	Estonia	12:18.48	
	Mónica Amboya	Ecuador	DNS	
	Yuliya Mochalova	Russia	DNS	
