= Valentyna Zhudina =

Ukrainian steeplechase runner

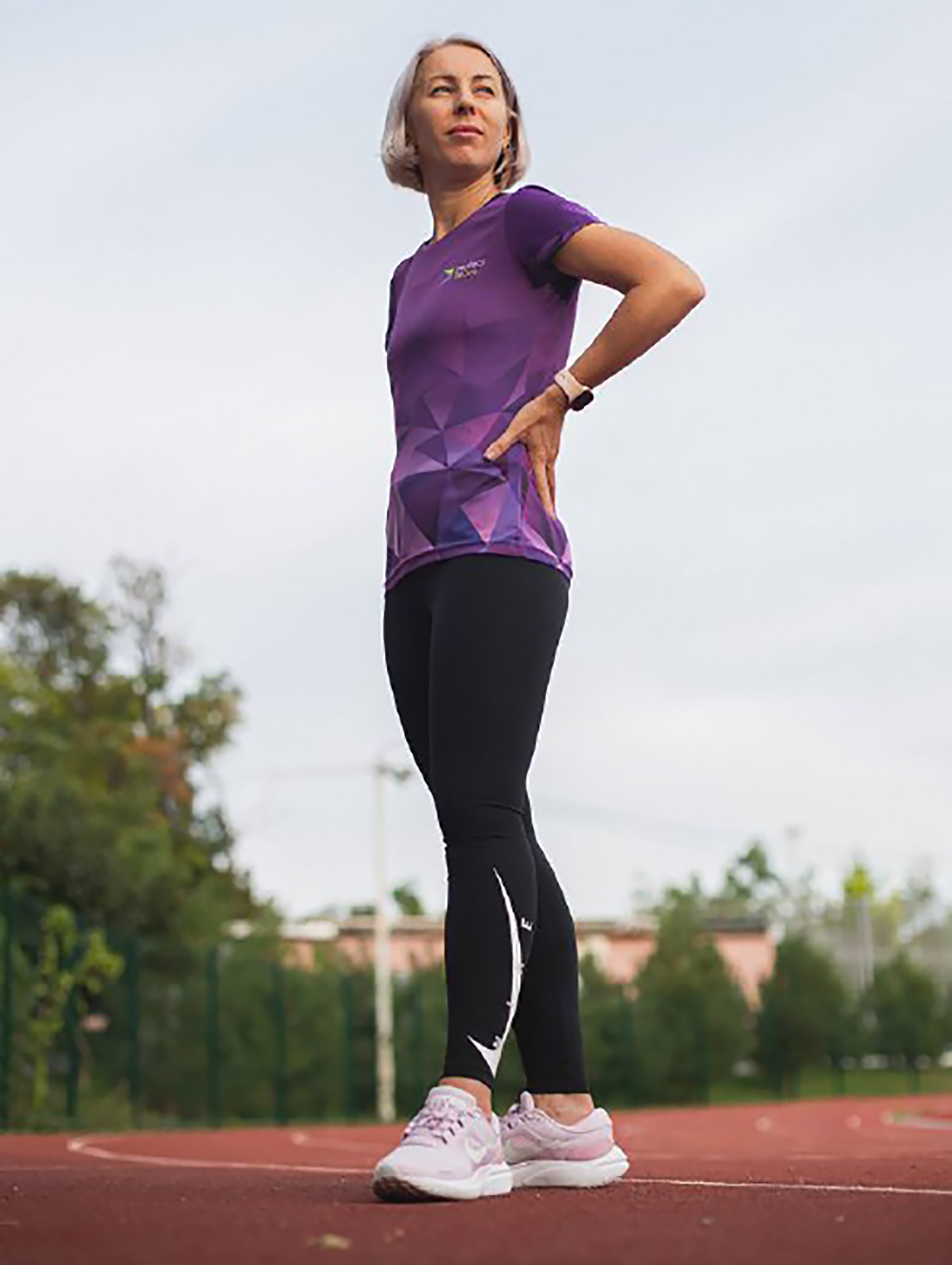
Valentina Zhudina

Valentyna Zhudina (Ukrainian: Валентина Жудіна, née Horpynych - Горпинич; born 12 March 1983 in Zhytomyr) is a Ukrainian athlete. She competed in the 3000 metres steeplechase at the 2012 Summer Olympics, placing 22nd with a time of 9:37.90. At the 2008 Summer Olympics, she didn't qualify beyond the first round.

== Competition record ==
Year	Competition	Venue	Position	Event	Notes
Representing Ukraine
2003	European U23 Championships	Bydgoszcz, Poland	13th	3000 m s'chase	10:26.65
2005	European U23 Championships	Erfurt, Germany	11th	3000 m s'chase	10:19.72
2005	World Championships	Helsinki, Finland	30th (h)	3000 m s'chase	9:59.29
2005	Universiade	İzmir, Turkey	4th	3000 m s'chase	10:03.31
2007	Universiade	Bangkok, Thailand	2nd	3000 m s'chase	9:45.55
2007	World Championships	Osaka, Japan	40th (h)	3000 m s'chase	10:13.87
2008	Olympic Games	Beijing, China	28th (h)	3000 m s'chase	9:43.95
2009	Universiade	Belgrade, Serbia	–	3000 m s'chase	DNF
2012	Olympic Games	London, United Kingdom	22nd (h)	3000 m s'chase	9:37.90
2013	World Championships	Moscow, Russia	7th	3000 m s'chase	9:33.73
