= Korene Hinds =

Jamaican long-distance runner

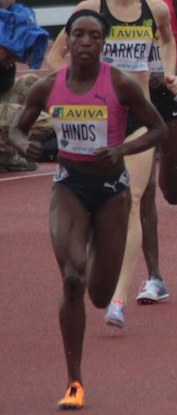
- Korene Hinds in 2012

Personal information
- Nationality: Jamaica
- Born: 19 October 1976 (age 49) Saint Catherine, Jamaica
- Height: 1.63 m (5 ft 4 in)
- Weight: 54 kg (119 lb)

Sport
- Sport: Athletics
- Event: 3000 metres steeplechase
Medal record
Athletics
Representing Jamaica
Central American and Caribbean Championships in Athletics
Gold medal – first place	2011 Mayagüez	3000 m st
Silver medal – second place	2011 Mayagüez	1500 m
Silver medal – second place	2005 Nassau	3000 m st
Central American and Caribbean Games
Silver medal – second place	2002 San Salvador	1500 m
CARIFTA Games Youth (U17)
Gold medal – first place	1991 Port of Spain	1500 m

Korene Hinds (born 19 October 1976) is a Jamaican long-distance runner who specializes in the 3000 metre steeplechase.

Hinds is from Spanish Town, Jamaica. She began distance running in the sixth grade and competed for St. Jago High School. She began her collegiate career at Essex County College, winning the 1500 m, 3000 m, and 5000 m at the 1997 NJCAA indoor championships. She was then an All-American runner for the Kansas State Wildcats track and field team, placing runner-up in the 3000 metres at the 2000 NCAA Division I Outdoor Track and Field Championships.

== Competition record ==
Year	Competition	Venue	Position	Event	Notes
Representing Jamaica
1991	World Cross Country Championships	Antwerp, Belgium	100th	Junior race	
1991	CARIFTA Games (U17)	Port of Spain, Trinidad and Tobago	1st	1500 m	4:37.84
1992	World Cross Country Championships	Boston, United States	103rd	Junior race	
2002	Central American and Caribbean Games	San Salvador, El Salvador	2nd	1500m	4:22.03
2002	Central American and Caribbean Games	San Salvador, El Salvador	4th	4 × 400 m relay	3:38.90
2003	World Indoor Championships	Birmingham, United Kingdom	18th (h)	3000 m	9:15.18
2005	Central American and Caribbean Championships	Nassau, Bahamas	2nd	3000 m s'chase	9:58.05
2005	World Championships	Helsinki, Finland	4th	3000 m s'chase	9:33.30
2005	World Athletics Final	Monte Carlo, Monaco	6th	3000 m s'chase	
2007	World Championships	Osaka, Japan	17th (h)	3000 m s'chase	9:44.04
2008	Olympic Games	Beijing, China	–	3000 m s'chase	DNF
2011	Central American and Caribbean Championships	Mayagüez, Puerto Rico	2nd	1500 m	4:23.78
2011	Central American and Caribbean Championships	Mayagüez, Puerto Rico	1st	3000 m s'chase	9:54:67
2011	World Championships	Daegu, South Korea	19th (h)	3000 m s'chase	9:52.11
2012	Olympic Games	London, United Kingdom	24th (q)	3000 m s'chase	9:37.95

=== Personal bests ===
Outdoor

- 800 metres – 2:03.09 min (2010)
- 1500 metres – 4:13.68 min (2010)
- 3000 metres – 9:10.10 min (2000)
- 3000 metre steeplechase – 9:28.86 min (2007)

Indoor

- 1500 metres – 4:19.48 min (2008)
- One mile – 4:39.76 min (2009)
- 3000 metres – 9:08.55 min (2003)
