= Robert Kipngetich =

Kenyan long-distance runner

Robert Sigei Kipngetich (born 3 January 1982) is a Kenyan long-distance runner. He has competed at meets on the IAAF Golden League and IAAF Grand Prix circuits. He finished eleventh in the 5000 metres at the 2005 World Athletics Final.

== Personal bests ==
- 3000 metres - 7:39.02 min (2007)
- 5000 metres - 13:06.71 min (2007)
- 10,000 metres - 27:04.18 min (2007)
