= Agnes Tschurtschenthaler =

Italian athlete (born 1982)

Personal information
- National team: Italy
- Born: 12 January 1982 (age 44) Innichen, Italy
- Height: 1.61 m (5 ft 3 in)
- Weight: 47 kg (104 lb)

Sport
- Sport: Athletics
- Event: Long-distance running

Achievements and titles
- Personal best: 3000 m st: 9:55.26 (2007)

Agnes Tschurtschenthaler (born 12 January 1982) is an Italian middle- and long-distance runner who specialized in the 1500 metres and 3000 metres steeplechase.

== Biography ==
In her early career, she finished eleventh at the 1999 World Youth Championships and competed at the 2000 World Junior Championships without reaching the final. She later finished ninth at the 2005 Summer Universiade and competed without reaching the final at the 2006 European Championships, both in the steeplechase, and finished eighth in the 1500 metres at the 2009 Mediterranean Games.

Her personal best times were 4:14.42 minutes in the 1500 metres, achieved in May 2006 in Conegliano; 9:02.05 minutes in the 3000 metres, achieved in May 2006 in Rovereto; 9:55.26 minutes in the 3000 metres steeplechase, achieved in July 2007 in Rethimno; and 16:11.42 minutes in the 5000 metres, achieved in May 2012 in Koblenz. In 2015, she ran the Udine Half Marathon in 1:12:54 hours.
