= Dobrinka Shalamanova =

Bulgarian steeplechase runner

Dobrinka Shalamanova (Bulgarian: Добринка Шаламанова; born 1 May 1983) is a Bulgarian long-distance runner who specializes in the 3000 metres steeplechase.

== Competition record ==
Year	Competition	Venue	Position	Event	Notes
Representing Bulgaria
2005	European U23 Championships	Erfurt, Germany	4th	3000 m s'chase	10:00.47
2005	World Championships	Helsinki, Finland	32nd (h)	3000 m s'chase	10:07.75
2005	Universiade	İzmir, Turkey	11th	5000 m	16:45.52
2005	Universiade	İzmir, Turkey	7th	3000 m s'chase	10:08.03
2006	European Championships	Gothenburg, Sweden	26th (h)	3000 m s'chase	10:01.56
2007	European Indoor Championships	Birmingham, United Kingdom	10th	3000 m	9:13.75
2007	Universiade	Bangkok, Thailand	1st	3000 m s'chase	9:45.04
2007	World Championships	Osaka, Japan	30th (h)	3000 m s'chase	9:58.76
2008	Olympic Games	Beijing, China	–	3000 m s'chase	DNF

=== Personal bests ===
- 800 metres – 2:08.11 min (2005)
- 1500 metres – 4:19.27 min (2005)
- 3000 metres – 9:06.32 min (2005)
- 3000 metres steeplechase – 9:42.08 min (2007)
- 5000 metres – 16:14.08 min (2005)
- 10,000 metres – 33:41.03 min (2006)
- Marathon – 2:48.03 min (2005)
