= 2007 World Championships in Athletics – Women's 3000 metres steeplechase =

The women's 3000 metres steeplechase event at the 2007 World Championships in Athletics took place on August 25, 2007 (heats) and August 27, 2007 (final) at the Nagai Stadium in Osaka, Japan. The first four of each heat (Q) plus the three fastest times (q) qualified for the final.

== Medallists ==
Gold	Yekaterina Volkova; Russia (RUS)
Silver	Tatyana Petrova; Russia (RUS)
Bronze	Eunice Jepkorir; Kenya (KEN)

== Records ==
World record	9:01.59	Gulnara Samitova	Russia	Iraklio, Greece	4 July 2004
Championship record	9:06.57	Yekaterina Volkova	Russia	Osaka, Japan	2005

== Results ==
=== Final ===
Place	Athlete	Nation	Mark	Notes
1	Yekaterina Volkova	Russia	9:06.57	CR WL PB
2	Tatyana Petrova	Russia	9:09.19	PB
3	Eunice Jepkorir	Kenya	9:20.09	
4	Ruth Bisibori	Kenya	9:25.25	WJR
5	Sophie Duarte	France	9:27.51	NR
6	Cristina Casandra	Romania	9:29.63	
7	Gulnara Samitova-Galkina	Russia	9:30.24	
8	Rosa Morató	Spain	9:36.84	
9	Hanane Ouhaddou	Morocco	9:37.87	
10	Roisin McGettigan	Ireland	9:39.80	
11	Veerle Dejaeghere	Belgium	9:40.10	
12	Fionnuala Britton	Ireland	9:48.09	
13	Sara Moreira	Portugal	10:00.40	
14	Mardrea Hyman	Jamaica	10:16.24	
—	Wioletta Janowska	Poland	DNF	

=== Qualification ===
==== Heat 1 ====
Place	Athlete	Nation	Mark	Notes
1	Eunice Jepkorir	Kenya	9:32.27	Q
2	Tatyana Petrova	Russia	9:38.80	Q
3	Veerle Dejaeghere	Belgium	9:38.95	Q
4	Roisin McGettigan	Ireland	9:39.41	Q
5	Hatti Dean	Great Britain & N.I.	9:43.23	
6	Mekdes Bekele	Ethiopia	9:50.12	
7	Jennifer Barringer	United States	9:51.04	
8	Zulema Fuentes-Pila	Spain	9:55.62	
9	Dobrinka Shalamanova	Bulgaria	9:58.76	
10	Zenaide Vieira	Brazil	10:04.40	
11	Nataliya Tobias	Ukraine	10:11.58	
12	Jin Yuan	China	10:14.46	
13	Irini Kokkinariou	Greece	10:19.62	
14	Tebogo Masehla	South Africa	10:41.02	
15	Kristine Eikrem Engeset	Norway	10:56.45	
—	Minori Hayakari	Japan	DNF	
—	Julie Coulaud	France	DNF	
—	Alesia Turava	Belarus	DNF	

==== Heat 2 ====
Place	Athlete	Nation	Mark	Notes
1	Rosa Morató	Spain	9:43.48	Q
2	Wioletta Janowska	Poland	9:43.96	Q
3	Gulnara Samitova-Galkina	Russia	9:43.98	Q
4	Sara Moreira	Portugal	9:44.01	Q
5	Korene Hinds	Jamaica	9:44.04	
6	Helen Clitheroe	Great Britain & N.I.	9:45.59	
7	Ancuta Bobocel	Romania	9:53.44	
8	Türkan Erismis	Turkey	9:54.77	
9	Karoline Bjerkeli Grøvdal	Norway	9:56.41	
10	Lindsey Anderson	United States	9:57.00	
11	Li Zhenzhu	China	10:00.55	
12	Zemzem Ahmed	Ethiopia	10:07.77	
13	Élodie Olivarès	France	10:08.39	
14	Andrea Mayr	Austria	10:14.22	
15	Sabine Heitling	Brazil	10:19.57	
—	Christin Johansson	Sweden	DNF	
—	Donna MacFarlane	Australia	DNF	
—	Sigrid Vanden Bempt	Belgium	DNF	

==== Heat 3 ====
Place	Athlete	Nation	Mark	Notes
1	Cristina Casandra	Romania	9:29.39	Q
2	Yekaterina Volkova	Russia	9:30.00	Q
3	Hanane Ouhaddou	Morocco	9:30.61	Q
4	Sophie Duarte	France	9:30.70	Q
5	Ruth Bisibori	Kenya	9:31.20	q PB
6	Mardrea Hyman	Jamaica	9:42.23	q
7	Fionnuala Britton	Ireland	9:42.38	q
8	Anna Willard	United States	9:48.62	
9	Elena Romagnolo	Italy	9:50.79	
10	Diana Martín	Spain	9:53.88	
11	Katarzyna Kowalska	Poland	9:58.74	
12	Stephanie de Croock	Belgium	10:01.74	
13	Zhu Yanmei	China	10:01.77	
14	Victoria Mitchell	Australia	10:06.61	
15	Netsanet Achamo	Ethiopia	10:12.59	
16	Valentyna Horpynych	Ukraine	10:13.87	
17	Silje Fjørtoft	Norway	10:32.33	
18	Yoshika Tatsumi	Japan	10:32.67	
