= Athletics at the 2005 Summer Universiade – Women's 5000 metres =

The women's 5000 metres event at the 2005 Summer Universiade was held on 19 August in İzmir, Turkey.

The winning margin was 15.74 seconds which as of 2024 remains the only time the women's 5,000 metres was won by more than 15 seconds at these games.

== Results ==
Rank	Athlete	Nationality	Time	Notes
1st place, gold medalist(s)	Kim Smith	New Zealand	15:29.18	CR
2nd place, silver medalist(s)	Tetyana Holovchenko	Ukraine	15:44.92	
3rd place, bronze medalist(s)	Jolene Byrne	Ireland	15:56.01	PB
4	Zeng Guang	China	16:03.43	
5	Mariem Alaoui Selsouli	Morocco	16:07.99	SB
6	Poppy Mlambo	South Africa	16:10.35	SB
7	Sonia Bejarano	Spain	16:18.14	
8	Mariko Nakao	Japan	16:21.96	
9	Ljiljana Ćulibrk	Croatia	16:27.20	NR
10	Megan Metcalfe	Canada	16:37.20	
11	Dobrinka Shalamanova	Bulgaria	16:45.52	SB
12	Jekaterina Patjuk	Estonia	16:58.48	
13	Yuki Ogauchi	Japan	16:59.30	PB
14	Minette Bell	South Africa	17:10.14	
15	Rini Budiarti	Indonesia	17:10.95	
16	Marilena Sophocleous	Cyprus	17:20.63	NJR
17	Gabriela Traña	Costa Rica	17:56.38	
	Jéssica Augusto	Portugal	DNF	
	Binnaz Uslu	Turkey	DNF	
