= Élodie Olivarès =

French athlete

Élodie Olivares
Personal information
- Nationality: French
- Born: 22 May 1976 (age 49) Paris
- Years active: 1984-2001
- Height: 1.71 m (5 ft 7 in)
- Weight: 55 kg (121 lb)

Sport
- Event(s): Cross country running, Steeplechase
- Club: CA Montreuil 93 ( - 2010); EFCVO (2011 - )

Élodie Olivarès (born 22 May 1976 in Paris) is a French athlete specialising in the 3000 metres steeplechase. She represented her country at three consecutive World Championships starting in 2005.

== Competition record ==
Year	Competition	Venue	Position	Event	Notes
Representing France
2001	Mediterranean Games	Radès, Tunisia	1st	3000 m s'chase	9:44.68
2005	World Championships	Helsinki, Finland	19th (h)	3000 m s'chase	9:49.28
2006	European Championships	Gothenburg, Sweden	11th	3000 m s'chase	9:52.69
2007	World Championships	Osaka, Japan	37th (h)	3000 m s'chase	10:08.39
2009	European Indoor Championships	Turin, Italy	15th (h)	3000 m	9:11.26
2009	World Championships	Berlin, Germany	28th (h)	3000 m s'chase	9:43.83

== Personal bests ==
Outdoor

- 1500 metres – 4:15.17 (Villeneuve-d'Ascq 2004)
- 3000 metres – 9:04.73 (Villeneuve-d'Ascq 2003)
- 5000 metres – 15:44.36 (Rome 2003)
- 3000 metres steeplechase – 9:33.12 (Heusden-Zolder 2002)

Indoor

- 3000 metres – 9:03.13 (Liévin 2009)

== Prize list ==
cross country running

- French Champion - long course in 2002, 2003 and 2006
- Vice-champion of France for Cross Country long course in 2004.
- Vice-champion of France for Cross Country short course in 2009.
- champion of France in 3000m steeplechase in 2002, 2004, 2006 and 2009
- Vice champion of France in 3000m steeplechase in 2001, 2005, 2007, 2008 and 2011.
- champion of France in Indoor 3000m in 2006 and 2007.
- record de France in 3000m steeplechase from 2001 to 2007
- Gold medal at Mediterranean Games in 2001 (Tunis)
- winner at European Cup of nations in 2004
- Team Bronze medal in 2001 at European Cross Country Championships.
- 22 selections for French teams.
