= Yekaterina Volkova (runner) =

Russian long-distance runner (born 1978)

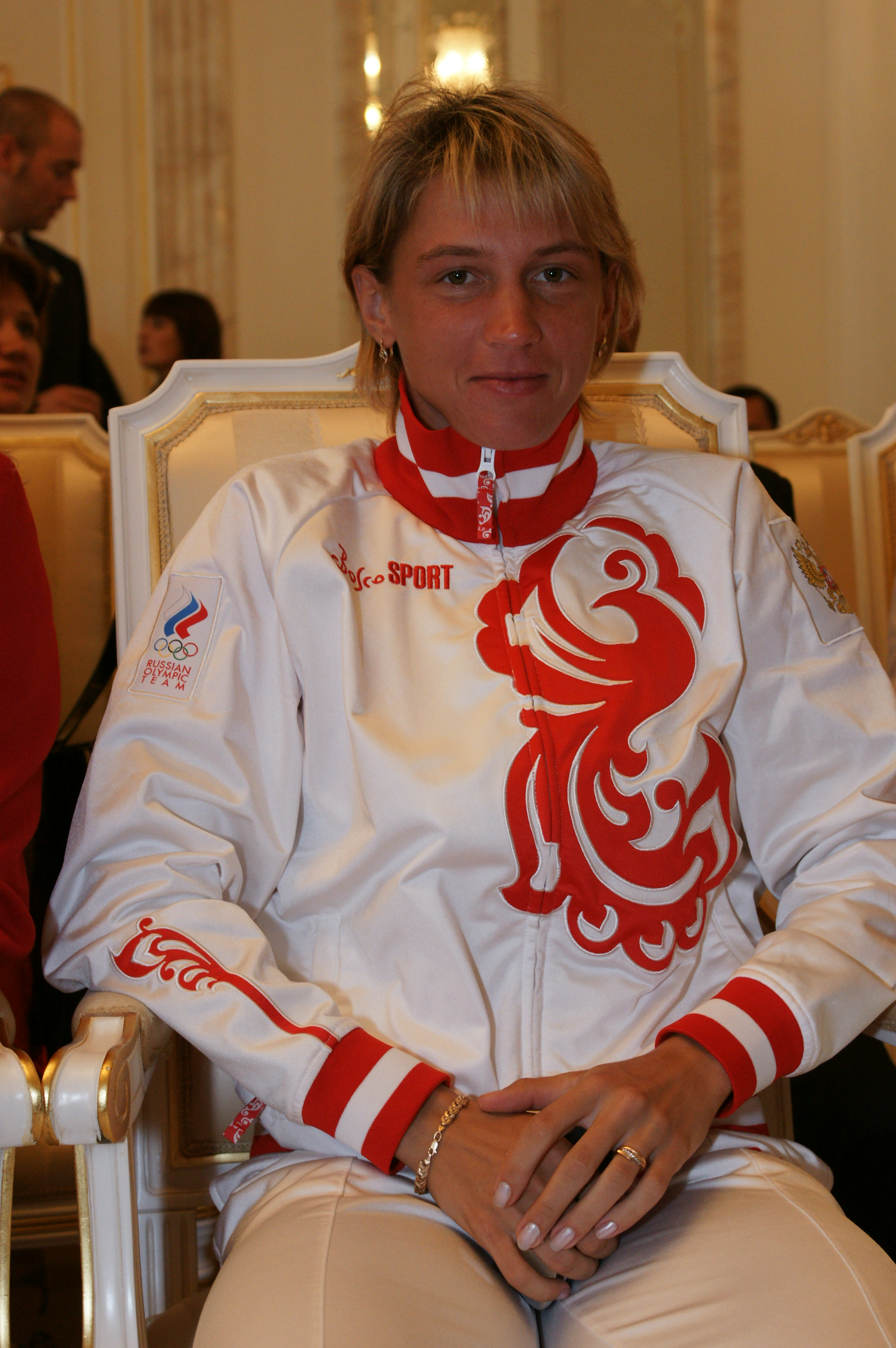

Medal record

Women's athletics

Representing Russia
Disqualified	2008 Beijing	3000 m s'chase

World Championships
Gold medal – first place	2007 Osaka	3000 m s'chase
Silver medal – second place	2005 Helsinki	3000 m s'chase

Yekaterina Gennadiyevna Volkova (Russian: Екатерина Геннадьевна Волкова; born 16 February 1978) is a Russian long-distance runner, who specializes in the 3000 metres steeplechase.

In her major international debut Volkova won the silver medal at the 2005 World Championships. Her time of 9:20.49 was a personal best.

In 2007, she won the gold medal at the 2007 World Championships in a world leading, championship record and personal best time of 9:06.57 minutes.

== Doping scandal ==
In May 2016, it was reported that Volkova was one of 14 Russian athletes, and nine medalists, implicated in doping following the retesting of urine from the 2008 Olympic Games. Volkova was named as having failed the retest, which was undertaken following the Russian doping scandal of 2015 and 2016. If confirmed, under IOC and IAAF rules, she stands to lose her Olympic medal, and all results, medals and records from the date of the original test to May 2016.

In October 2016, the IOC stripped Volkova of her bronze medal from the 2008 Beijing Olympics after her doping sample were retested and failed.

== Personal bests ==
- 1500 metres - 4:09.03 min (2005)
- 3000 metres - 8:54.64 min (2005)
- 3000 metres steeplechase - 9:06.57 min (2007)
- 5000 metres - 15:00.02 min (2007)

== See also ==
- List of doping cases in athletics
- List of Olympic medalists in athletics (women)
- List of 2008 Summer Olympics medal winners
- List of stripped Olympic medals
- Steeplechase at the Olympics
- Doping in Russia
- List of World Athletics Championships medalists (women)
- List of 5000 metres national champions (women)

Sporting positions
Preceded by Wioletta Janowska	Women's 3000 m Steeplechase; Best Year Performance; 2007	Succeeded by Gulnara Samitova-Galkina
