= 2004 IAAF World Indoor Championships – Women's 1500 metres =

The Women's 1500 metres event at the 2004 IAAF World Indoor Championships was held on March 5–6.

== Medalists ==
Gold	Silver	Bronze
Kutre Dulecha; Ethiopia	Carmen Douma-Hussar; Canada	Gulnara Galkina; Russia

== Results ==
=== Heat ===
First 3 of each heat (Q) and next 3 fastest (q) qualified for the semifinals.

Rank	Heat	Name	Nationality	Time	Notes
1	1	Kutre Dulecha	Ethiopia	4:06.44	Q
2	1	Gulnara Galkina	Russia	4:08.48	Q
3	1	Daniela Yordanova	Bulgaria	4:08.50	Q, SB
4	1	Nataliya Tobias	Ukraine	4:08.96	q, PB
5	1	Lidia Chojecka	Poland	4:09.01	q, SB
6	1	Carmen Douma-Hussar	Canada	4:09.28	q, NR
7	1	Judit Varga	Hungary	4:10.71	
8	2	Kelly Holmes	Great Britain	4:11.15	Q
9	2	Alesia Turava	Belarus	4:11.36	Q
10	2	Yuliya Kosenkova	Russia	4:11.37	Q
11	2	Sonja Roman	Slovenia	4:11.72	PB
12	1	Nuria Fernández	Spain	4:11.95	PB
13	2	Natalia Rodríguez	Spain	4:13.52	
14	2	Andrea Suldesová	Czech Republic	4:13.66	
15	1	Latifa Essarokh	France	4:13.74	PB
16	2	Alina Cucerzan	Romania	4:15.58	
17	1	Konstadina Efedaki	Greece	4:18.58	
18	2	Jenelle Deatherage	United States	4:20.21	
19	2	Nelya Neporadna	Ukraine	4:22.24	
	1	Niusha Mancilla	Bolivia	DNF	
	2	Mardrea Hyman	Jamaica	DNF	

=== Final ===
Rank	Name	Nationality	Time	Notes
1st place, gold medalist(s)	Kutre Dulecha	Ethiopia	4:06.40	
2nd place, silver medalist(s)	Carmen Douma-Hussar	Canada	4:08.18	NR
3rd place, bronze medalist(s)	Gulnara Galkina	Russia	4:08.26	
4	Daniela Yordanova	Bulgaria	4:08.52	
5	Nataliya Tobias	Ukraine	4:09.03	
6	Yuliya Kosenkova	Russia	4:09.32	
7	Alesia Turava	Belarus	4:09.81	
8	Lidia Chojecka	Poland	4:10.32	
9	Kelly Holmes	Great Britain	4:12.30	
