= Gulnara Samitova-Galkina =

Russian middle-distance runner

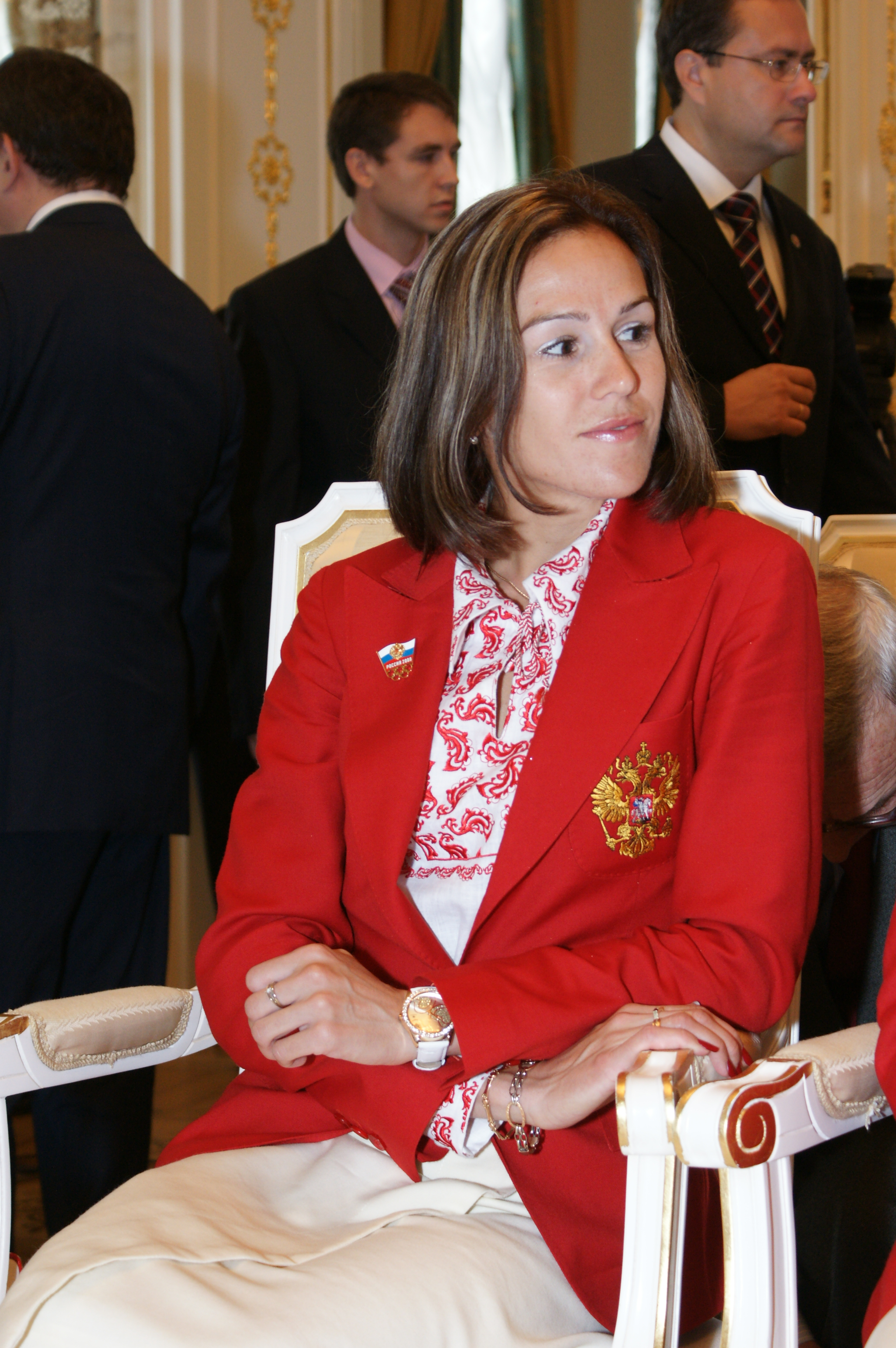

Personal information
- Born: 9 July 1978 (age 47) Naberezhnye Chelny, Russian SFSR, Soviet Union

Sport
- Country: Russia
- Sport: Women's athletics
Medal record
Olympic Games
Gold medal – first place	2008 Beijing	3000 m steeplechase
World Indoor Championships
Bronze medal – third place	2004 Budapest	1500 m

Gulnara Iskanderovna Samitova-Galkina (Russian: Гульнара Искандеровна Самитова-Галкина, Tatar: Гөлнара Искәндәр кызы Самитова-Галкина) (born 9 July 1978 in Naberezhnye Chelny, Tatarstan) is a Russian distance runner. In July 2004 she ran 3000 metres steeplechase in a new world record of 9:01.59 minutes. Early that year she won a bronze medal over 1500 metres at the 2004 IAAF World Indoor Championships.

Gulnara Samitova-Galkina is of mixed Tatar and Russian origin. She is a two-time national champion in the women's 5000 metres.

Samitova claimed the gold medal at the 2008 Olympics in the 3000 m steeplechase, breaking her own world record in the final with a time of 8:58.81 min, becoming the first woman in history to run under 9 minutes for the steeplechase.

She won both the 800 and 1500 metres races at the Russian Team Championships in June 2009, clocking a personal best of 2:00.29 in the 800 m and a world leading time over 1500 m.

She missed the entire 2010 season, including the 2010 European Athletics Championships, after she fell pregnant. She gave birth to her daughter Alina in June, and returned to training that autumn.

== International competitions ==
Representing Russia
Year	Competition	Venue	Position	Event	Notes
2003	World Championships	Paris, France	7th	5000 m	
2004	World Indoor Championships	Budapest, Hungary	3rd	1500 m	
2004	Olympic Games	Athens, Greece	6th	5000 m	
2007	World Championships	Osaka, Japan	7th	3000 m s'chase	
2008	Olympic Games	Beijing, China	1st	3000 m s'chase	
2008	Olympic Games	Beijing, China	12th	5000 m	
2008	World Athletics Final	Stuttgart, Germany	1st	3000 m s'chase	
2009	World Championships	Berlin, Germany	3rd	3000 m s'chase	
2012	Olympic Games	London, United Kingdom	DNF	3000 m s'chase	

== Personal bests ==
- 800 metres - 2:00.29 min (2009)
- 1500 metres - 4:01.29 min (2004)
- Mile run - 4:20.23 min (2007)
- 3000 metres - 8:42.96 min (2008)
- 3000 metres steeplechase - 8:58.81 min (2008)
- 5000 metres - 14:33.13 min (2008)

== See also ==
- List of Olympic medalists in athletics (women)
- List of 2008 Summer Olympics medal winners
- Steeplechase at the Olympics
- List of IAAF World Indoor Championships medalists (women)
- List of 5000 metres national champions (women)
- List of long-distance runners
- List of Tatars
- List of Russian sportspeople

Awards and achievements
Preceded by Alesia Turava	Women's 3000 m Steeplechase; World Record Holder; August 10, 2003 – August 27, 2016	Succeeded by Ruth Jebet
Sporting positions
Preceded by Alesia Turava; Yekaterina Volkova	Women's 3000 m Steeplechase; Best Year Performance; 2003–2004; 2008	Succeeded by Dorcus Inzikuru; Incumbent
