= Athletics at the 1999 Summer Universiade – Women's 5000 metres =

The women's 5000 metres event at the 1999 Summer Universiade was held on 13 July at the Estadio Son Moix in Palma de Mallorca, Spain.

== Results ==
| Rank | Athlete | Nationality | Time | Notes |
|---|---|---|---|---|
| 1st place, gold medalist(s) | Rie Ueno | Japan | 15:51.24 | |
| 2nd place, silver medalist(s) | Ana Dias | Portugal | 15:53.23 | |
| 3rd place, bronze medalist(s) | Cristina Casandra | Romania | 16:03.18 | |
| 4 | Kristin Beaney | United States | 16:08.24 | |
| 5 | Chan Man Yee | Hong Kong | 16:09.65 | |
| 6 | Yuri Kanō | Japan | 16:11.15 | |
| 7 | Tara Krzywicki | Great Britain | 16:17.53 | |
| 8 | María Abel | Spain | 16:29.81 | |
| 9 | Margarita Tapia | Mexico | 16:31.27 | |
| 10 | Nicole Jefferson | United States | 16:33.53 | |
| 11 | Sabrina Varrone | Italy | 16:40.18 | |
| 12 | Luminita Gogîrlea | Romania | 16:41.98 | |
| | Rikke Pedersen | Denmark | DNF | |
| | Dorte Vibjerg | Denmark | DNS | |
