= Clarisse Cruz =

Portuguese runner

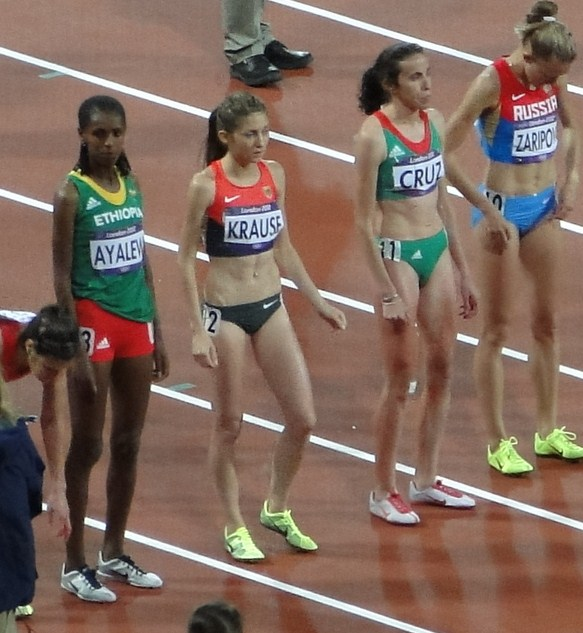
- Cruz (centre right) at the start of the 2012 Olympic steeplechase final

Personal information
- Born: 9 July 1978 (age 48) Ovar, Portugal
- Height: 1.70 m (5 ft 7 in)

Sport
- Country: Portugal
- Sport: Athletics
- Event: 3000 m steeplechase

Achievements and titles
- Personal bests: 3000 m steeplechase: 9:30.06 (London, August 2012)

Clarisse Cruz (born 9 July 1978 in Ovar) is a Portuguese runner who specialises in the 3000 metres steeplechase.

== Competitions ==
At the 2004 Ibero-American Championships in Athletics she won the silver medal in the Women's 3000 metres steeplechase event with a time of 9:55.24.

At the 2008 Summer Olympics she ran in heat 1 of round 1 of the Women's 3000 metres steeplechase event, finishing overall in round 1 in 34th place with a time of 9:49.45.

She competed in the Women's 3000 metres steeplechase event at the 2005 World Championships in Athletics. In round 1 she finished in 10th place in heat 1 with a time of 10:06.96 and did not qualify for the final.

She competed in the Women's 3000 metres steeplechase event at the 2012 European Athletics Championships. In round 1 she qualified for the final with a personal best time of 9:40.30. In the final she finished in 9th place with a time of 9:47.76.

She competed in the Women's 3000 metres steeplechase event at the 2012 Summer Olympics. In round 1 she qualified by performance for the final with a personal best time of 9:30.06. She finished in 11th place in the final with a time of 9:32.44.
