= Lívia Tóth =

Hungarian runner (born 1980)

Lívia Tóth (born 7 January 1980) is a Hungarian runner who specializes in the 3000 metre steeplechase.

== International competitions ==
| Year | Competition | Venue | Position | Event | Notes |
Representing Hungary
| 2001 | European U23 Championships | Amsterdam, Netherlands | 2nd | 3000m steeplechase | 10:04.99 |
| 2002 | European Indoor Championships | Vienna, Austria | 13th | 3000 m | 9:14.58 |
| 2003 | Universiade | Daegu, South Korea | 7th | 1500 m | 4:14.15 |
| 2005 | Universiade | İzmir, Turkey | 1st | 3000 m st. GR | 9:40.37 |
| 2005 | World Athletics Final | Monte Carlo, Monaco | 4th | 3000 m st. | 9:30.20 |

== Personal bests ==
- 800 metres - 2:04.86 min (2003)
- 1500 metres - 4:09.28 min (2003)
- 3000 metres - 8:58.53 min (2002)
- 3000 metre steeplechase - 9:30.20 min (2005)

== Awards ==
- Hungarian athlete of the Year (1): 2005
