= Rasa Troup =

Lithuanian steeplechase runner

Personal information
- Full name: Rasa Michniovaitė-Troup
- Nationality: Lithuania
- Born: 1 March 1977 (age 49) Vilnius, Lithuania
- Height: 1.75 m (5 ft 9 in)

Sport
- Sport: Athletics
- Event: Steeplechase running

Rasa Troup (née Michniovaitė) (born March 1, 1977) is a Lithuanian steeplechase runner. She represented Lithuania at the 2008 Summer Olympics in Beijing, and competed in the inaugural women's 3000 m steeplechase. She is also a registered and licensed dietitian, specializing in health and nutrition, and a full-fledged member of the American Dietetic Association (ADA).

Born and raised in Vilnius from a highly sports-minded family, Troup started out her athletic career as a middle-distance runner, and had won several titles in national junior championships for both indoor and outdoor competitions. In 1998, she moved to the United States, and attended the University of Minnesota, where she played for the women's cross-country team, under head coach Gary Wilson. During her two-year collegiate team career, Troup had earned All-American honors in cross-country running, and later became the first athlete to win the Roy Griak invitational, as well as the program's first NCAA regional champion. She also posted times in middle-distance running, specifically in the 1000 and 1500 metres, while enjoying her athletic success. In 2000, she received her bachelor's degree in physiology, completed her master's degree in nutrition, and fulfilled her dietetic internship from the University of Minnesota.

After graduating from the university, Troup pursued to run and compete for the steeplechase as advised by her head coach. In 2005, she made her international debut, and represented her home nation at the IAAF World Championships in Helsinki, Finland. She posted her possible personal best time of 9:47.47, in the women's steeplechase event for the first time, finishing fifth in the second heat. Troup eventually entered the 2006 European Athletics Championships in Gothenburg, Sweden, only to miss the final by more than seven seconds in the first heat, with a time of 9:53.14.

Troup qualified for the 2008 Summer Olympics in Beijing, after reaching an A-standard time at a collegiate competition. She also became the first Lithuanian athlete at the Olympics, to compete in middle-distance running, and one of the first females to run for the steeplechase. In her sporting event, Troup finished eighth in the heats, with an impressive, newer personal best time of 9:30.21. Although she failed to advance into the semi-finals, she also set a national record for the steeplechase event.

== Sports nutrition and wellness ==
Since she came to the United States in 1998, Troup had experience in many different areas of nutrition through proper physical training, and clinical and sports intervention. She fulfilled her internship from the University of Minnesota, because of her knowledge and adaptability in nutrition and health diet, and completed her master's degree in nutrition. After graduating from the university, Troup continued to raise awareness with sports nutrition and health. She has worked with many fitness trainers and experts, high school and collegiate teams, and even All-American and Paralympic athletes. Her services included nutrition assessments, meal planning, meals for home and travel, grocery shopping trips, and one-on-one consultations, regarding nutrition and proper health diet. One of her contributions towards nutrition and wellness included her dietary work for the women's cross-country team at the University of Minnesota.
