= Cristina Casandra =

Romanian long-distance runner

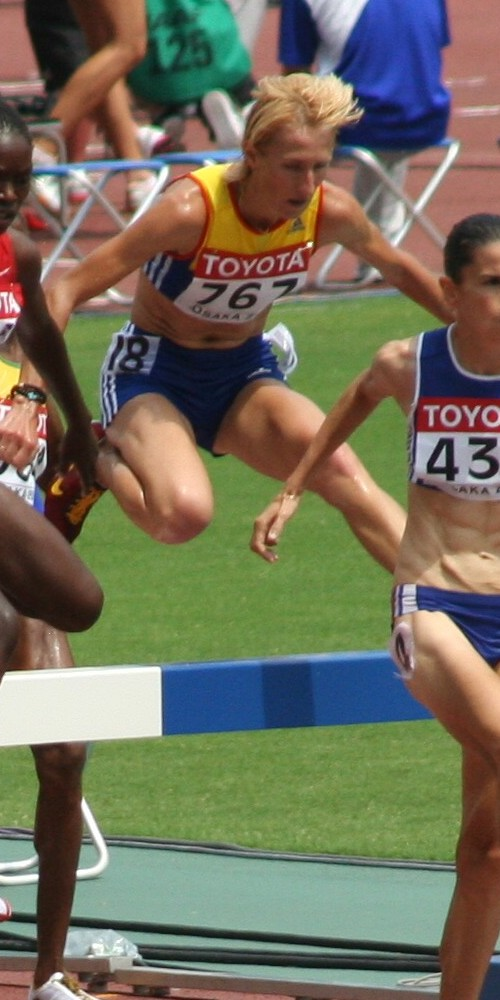

Personal information
- Born: 1 February 1977 (age 49) Zalău, Romania

Sport
- Sport: Track and field
Medal record
Representing Romania
Summer Universiade
Bronze medal – third place	1999 Palma de Mallorca	5000m
Bronze medal – third place	2003 Daegu	5000m
European U23 Championships
Silver medal – second place	1997 Turku	5000m
Silver medal – second place	1999 Gothenburg	5000m
World Junior Championships
Bronze medal – third place	1996 Sydney	5000m

Cristina Casandra, (née Iloc, born 1 February 1977) is a Romanian long-distance runner who specializes mainly in the 3000 metres steeplechase. She took up the event in 2000, having initially specialized in the 5000 metres.

She was the bronze medalist at the Balkan Cross Country Championships in March 2011. She finished 5th at the 2008 Summer Olympics, but did not reach the final at the 2012 Summer Olympics.

== Achievements ==
Year	Competition	Venue	Position	Event	Notes
Representing Romania
1996	World Junior Championships	Sydney, Australia	3rd	5000 m	15:41.44
1997	European U23 Championships	Turku, Finland	2nd	5000 m	15:46.59
1999	Universiade	Palma de Mallorca, Spain	3rd	5000 m	16:03.18
1999	European U23 Championships	Gothenburg, Sweden	2nd	5000m	15:22.64
2003	Universiade	Daegu, South Korea	3rd	5000 m	15:50.44
2005	World Championships	Helsinki, Finland	7th	3000 m s'chase	9:39.52
2005	World Athletics Final	Monte Carlo, Monaco	7th	3000 m s'chase	9:46.06
2006	European Championships	Gothenburg, Sweden	10th	3000 m s'chase	9:42.94
2006	World Athletics Final	Stuttgart, Germany	5th	3000 m s'chase	9:40.47
2007	World Championships	Osaka, Japan	6th	3000 m s'chase	9:29.63
2008	Olympic Games	Beijing, China	5th	3000 m s'chase	9:16.85
2009	World Championships	Berlin, Germany	11th (heats)	3000 m s'chase	9:49.88

=== Personal bests ===
- 3000 metres - 9:02.94 min (2001)
- 3000 metres steeplechase - 9:16.85 min (2008)
- 5000 metres - 15:22.64 min (1999)

Records
Preceded by (Russia) Yelena Motalova	Women's 3,000m Steeplechase; World Record Holder; 7 August 2000 – 5 June 2002	Succeeded by (Poland) Justyna Bak
Sporting positions
Preceded by (Russia) Yelena Motalova	Women's 3,000m Steeplechase; Best Year Performance; 2000	Succeeded by (Poland) Justyna Bak
