= Mardrea Hyman =

Jamaican runner (born 1972)

Personal information
- Born: 22 December 1972 (age 53) Clarendon, Jamaica

Sport
- Sport: Track and field
Medal record
Women's athletics
Representing Jamaica
Pan American Games
Bronze medal – third place	2003 Santo Domingo	1500 m
CAC Games
Gold medal – first place	1998 Maracaibo	1500m
Bronze medal – third place	1998 Maracaibo	800m
CAC Championships
Gold medal – first place	2005 Nassau	3000m s'chase
Gold medal – first place	1995 Guatemala City	1500m
Silver medal – second place	1995 Guatemala City	800m
Silver medal – second place	1997 San Juan	1500m
CARIFTA Games Junior (U20)
Gold medal – first place	1990 Kingston	3000 m
Silver medal – second place	1990 Kingston	1500 m
Bronze medal – third place	1988 Kingston	3000 m
Bronze medal – third place	1989 Bridgetown	3000 m
CARIFTA Games (Under 17s)
Bronze medal – third place	1988 Kingston	1500 m

Mardrea Elaine Hyman (born 22 December 1972) is a Jamaican runner who specializes in the 1500 metres and 3000 metres steeplechase.

Hyman competed for the Barton Cougars track and field team in the NJCAA and the Texas Longhorns women's track and field teams in the NCAA.

== Competition record ==
Year	Competition	Venue	Position	Event	Notes
Representing Jamaica
1988	CARIFTA Games (U17)	Kingston, Jamaica	3rd	1500 m	4:47.50
1989	CARIFTA Games (U20)	Bridgetown, Barbados	3rd	3000 m	10:37.6
1990	CARIFTA Games (U20)	Kingston, Jamaica	2nd	1500 m	4:48.26
1990	CARIFTA Games (U20)	Kingston, Jamaica	1st	3000 m	10:08.75
1995	CAC Championships	Guatemala City, Guatemala	2nd	800 m	2:08.23
1995	CAC Championships	Guatemala City, Guatemala	1st	1500 m	4:31.74
1997	CAC Championships	San Juan, Puerto Rico	2nd	1500 m	4:21.31
1998	CAC Games	Maracaibo, Venezuela	3rd	800 m	2:01.46
1998	CAC Games	Maracaibo, Venezuela	1st	1500 m	4:27.03
1998	Commonwealth Games	Kuala Lumpur, Malaysia	4th	800 m	1:59.71
1998	Commonwealth Games	Kuala Lumpur, Malaysia	4th	4 × 400 m	3:34.74
1999	World Indoor Championships	Maebashi, Japan	–	800 m	DNF
2000	Olympic Games	Sydney, Australia	21st (h)	1500 m	4:14.20
2001	World Championships	Edmonton, Canada	10th	1500 m	4:12.48
2001	Goodwill Games	Brisbane, Australia	7th	5000 m	16:03.71
2002	Commonwealth Games	Manchester, United Kingdom	6th	1500 m	4:10.47
2002	World Cup	Madrid, Spain	9th	1500 m	
2003	Pan American Games	Santo Domingo, Dominican Republic	3rd	1500 m	4:10.08
2003	World Championships	Paris, France	22nd (sf)	1500 m	4:13.95
2004	World Indoor Championships	Budapest, Hungary	–	1500 m	DNF
2005	World Championships	Helsinki, Finland	8th	3000 m s'chase	9:39.66
2005	World Athletics Final	Monte Carlo, Monaco	3rd	3000 m s'chase	9:27.21 (=NR)
2005	CAC Championships	Nassau, Bahamas	1st	3000 m s'chase	9:54.01
2006	Commonwealth Games	Melbourne, Australia	9th	3000 m s'chase	10:09.74
2007	World Championships	Osaka, Japan	14th	3000 m s'chase	10:16.24
2007	World Athletics Final	Stuttgart, Germany	9th	3000 m s'chase	
2008	Olympic Games	Beijing, China	–	3000 m s'chase	DNF
2011	World Championships	Daegu, South Korea	–	3000 m s'chase	DNF

=== Personal bests ===
- 800 metres - 1:59.71 min (1998)
- 1500 metres - 4:05.25 min (2001)
- Mile run - 4:33.90 min (2000)
- 3000 metre steeplechase - 9:27.21 min (2005)
