= Salome Chepchumba =

Salome Chepchumba (born 29 September 1982) is a female middle-distance runner from Kenya, who specializes in the 3000 metres steeplechase.

== International competitions ==
Year	Competition	Venue	Position	Event	Notes
Representing Kenya
2005	World Championships	Helsinki, Finland	5th	3000 m s'chase	
2005	World Athletics Final	Monte Carlo, Monaco	10th	3000 m s'chase	
2006	World Athletics Final	Stuttgart, Germany	3rd	3000 m s'chase	

=== Personal bests ===
- 3000 metres - 8:51.5 min (2000)
- 3000 metre steeplechase - 9:26.07 min (2006)
