= Roisin McGettigan =

Irish runner (born 1980)

Roisin McGettigan (born 23 August 1980 in Wicklow, Ireland) is an Irish runner who specializes in the 3000 metres steeplechase. She graduated from Providence College in 2003. She competed in her first Olympic Games in 2008 in Beijing. After finishing second in her qualifying heat in the 3000 m steeplechase, she finished 14th in the final.

In 2014, McGettigan was retroactively awarded the bronze medal for the 2009 European Athletics Indoor Championships 1500 metres race. The winner of that race, Anna Alminova of Russia, had all her results since February 2009 cancelled due to irregularities in her biological passport.

McGettigan and runner Lauren Fleshman co-created "Believe I Am", a company which brings sports psychology techniques used by pro athletes to women through apparel and training journals.

== International competitions ==
Year	Competition	Venue	Position	Event	Notes
Representing Ireland
2001	European U23 Championships	Amsterdam, Netherlands	10th	3000m steeplechase	10:46.66
2005	Universiade	İzmir, Turkey	6th	3000 m st.	10:07.58
2005	World Athletics Final	Monte Carlo, Monaco	9th	3000 m st.	9:46.12
2006	World Indoor Championships	Moscow, Russia	13th	3000 m	9:28.85
2006	World Athletics Final	Stuttgart, Germany	8th	3000 m st.	9:52.85
2007	World Championships	Osaka, Japan	10th	3000 m st. final	9:39.80
2008	Olympic Games	Beijing, China	14th	3000 m st. final	9:55.89
2009	European Indoor Championships	Turin, Italy	3rd	1500 m	4:11.58

== Personal bests ==
- 1500 metres - 4:10.34 min (2003)
- Mile run - 4:30.06 min (2009)
- 3000 metres - 9:03 min (2005)
- 3000 metres steeplechase - 9:28.29 min (2007)
- 5000 metres - 15:57.91 min (2008)
