= Carrie Messner =

American long-distance runner (born 1977)

Carrie Messner-Vickers (née Messner; born 7 June 1977) is an American long-distance runner who specializes in the 3000 metres steeplechase. Her personal best for the steeplechase is 9:39.68 minutes, set in 2005.

She finished fifteenth at the 2005 World Championships and finished ninth at the 2006 World Athletics Final.

She attended Mullen High School and the University of Colorado Boulder.

Messner was an All-American runner for the Colorado Buffaloes track and field team, finishing 4th in the mile run at the 1999 NCAA Division I Indoor Track and Field Championships. After failing to make the Olympic team at the 2008 United States Olympic trials, she began focusing on road races citing financial reasons.

== Personal bests ==
- 1500 metres - 4:13.70 min (2004)
- 3000 metres steeplechase - 9:39.68 min (2005)
- 5000 metres -15:47.37 min (2005)
