= Kemel Thompson =

Jamaican hurdler

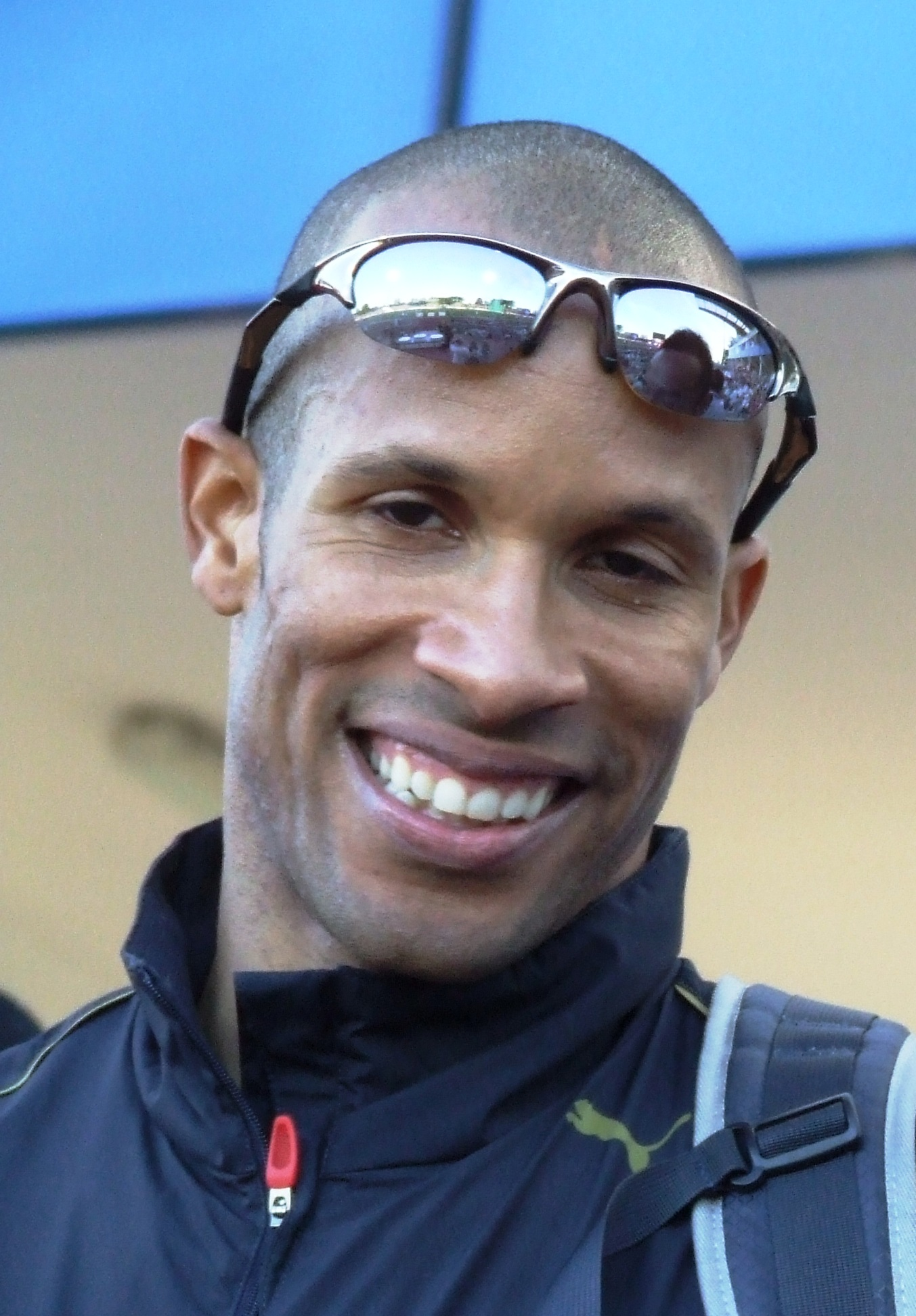
- Kemel Thompson, Bydgoszcz 2007

Medal record

Men's athletics

Representing Jamaica

World Indoor Championships
Gold medal – first place	2003 Birmingham	4x400 m relay

Kemel Thompson (born 25 September 1974) is a former Jamaican athlete who competes in the 400 metres hurdles.

His personal best time is 48.05 seconds, achieved in London in 2003.

Kemel competed for the University of South Florida from 1992 to 1996 and graduated from Loughborough University's Business School in 2003. He was a member of the Jamaican Olympic Team at the 2000 and 2004 Summer Olympics.

== Achievements ==
Year	Tournament	Venue	Result	Event
1997	Central American and Caribbean Championships	San Juan, Puerto Rico	2nd	400m hurdles
1998	Central American and Caribbean Games	Maracaibo, Venezuela	3rd	400m hurdles
2003	World Championships	Paris, France	5th	400m hurdles
	World Athletics Final	Monte Carlo, Monaco	2nd	400m hurdles
2004	World Athletics Final	Monte Carlo, Monaco	3rd	400m hurdles
2005	World Athletics Final	Monte Carlo, Monaco	2nd	400m hurdles
2006	Commonwealth Games	Melbourne, Australia	3rd	400m hurdles
