= Victoria Mitchell =

Australian long-distance runner

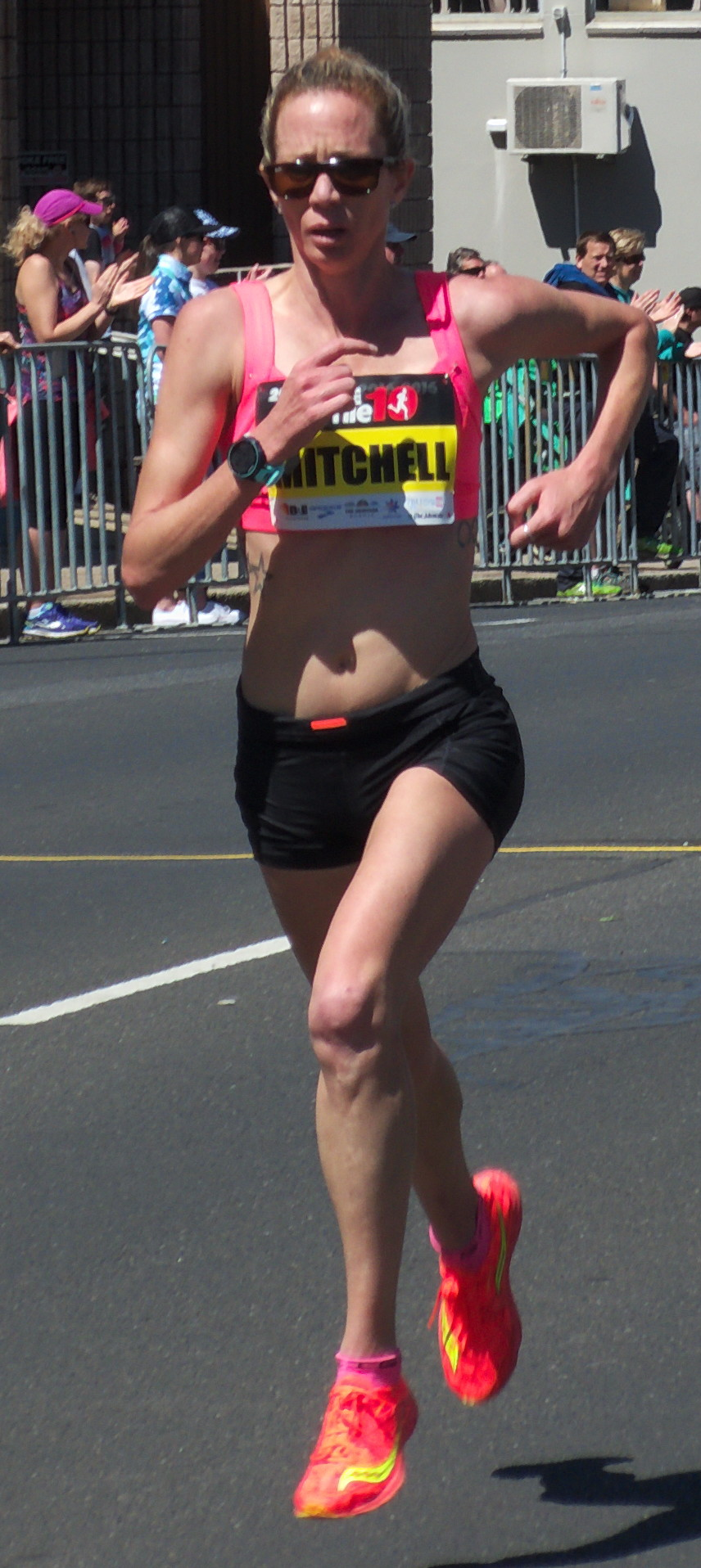
- Mitchell in the 2016 Burnie Ten

Personal information
- Born: 25 April 1982 (age 44) Oakleigh, Victoria, Australia
- Education: University of Ballarat
- Height: 1.64 m (5 ft 5 in)
- Weight: 47 kg (104 lb)

Sport
- Country: Australia
- Sport: Track and field
- Event: 3000m steeplechase
- Coached by: Peter Good

Victoria Mitchell (born 25 April 1982) is an Australian long-distance runner who specializes in the 3000 metres steeplechase.

Victoria took part in the World Student Cross Country Championships in 2002 and finished in eleventh place.

Victoria won two Horizon League Cross Country Championships in 2004 and 2005 as a Butler University student-athlete.

Victoria finished fourth at the 2005 NCAA Women's Division I Cross Country Championship as a Butler University senior in a time of 19:50.4.

Mitchell won the 2005 NCAA Division I steeplechase national championship, while competing at Butler.

Her first international medal was a silver at the 2005 Summer Universiade. She was the 2007 winner of the Great Ireland Run. She represented Australia at the Olympics at the 2008 Beijing Games.

== Achievements ==
Year	Competition	Venue	Position	Event
2005	Universiade	İzmir, Turkey	2nd	3000 m st.
2006	World Cross Country Championships	Fukuoka, Japan	33rd	Short race
2006	World Cross Country Championships	Fukuoka, Japan	34th	Long race
2006	Commonwealth Games	Melbourne, Australia	4th	3000 m st.
2006	World Athletics Final	Stuttgart, Germany	7th	3000 m st.
2006	World Cup	Athens, Greece	4th	3000 m st.
2007	World Cross Country Championships	Mombasa, Kenya	37th	Senior race
2007	World Championships in Athletics	Osaka, Japan	14th (heats)	3000 m st.
2008	World Cross Country Championships	Edinburgh, Scotland	54th	Senior race
2008	Summer Olympics	Beijing, China	13th (heats)	3000 m st.
2015	World Championships	Beijing, China	26th (h)	3000 m st.
2016	Summer Olympics	Rio de Janeiro, Brazil	10th (heats)	3000 m st.
2017	World Championships	London, United Kingdom	11th (heats)	3000 m st.
2018	Commonwealth Games	Gold Coast, Australia	9th	3000 m st.

=== Personal bests ===
- One mile - 4:38.05 min (2006)
- 3000 metres - 8:58.42 min (2006)
- 3000 metres steeplechase - 9:30.84 min (2006)
- 5000 metres - 15:36.15 min (2006)

=== International competition ===
2002 World Student Cross Ctry Cross Country (6 km) 11/57 11th 20:50
2005 Universiade 3,000 metres Steeplechase 2/15 2nd 9:47.54
2006 Commonwealth Games 3,000 metres Steeplechase 4/15 4th 9:34.24
2006 World Cup 3,000 metres Steeplechase 4/9 4th 9:36.34
2006 World Cross Ctry Cross Country (8 km) 34/99 34th 27:12
2006 Short Course XC (4 km) 33/92 33rd 13:36
2007 World Championships 3,000 metres Steeplechase 35/54 Ht3 14th 10:06.61
2007 World Cross Ctry Cross Country 37/94 37th 29:48
2008 Olympic Games 3,000 metres Steeplechase 32/51 Ht1 13th 9:47.88
2008 World Cross Ctry Cross Country (7.905 km) 54/99 54th 27:57
2014 Commonwealth Games 3,000 metres Steeplechase 9/11 Final 9th 9:49.05
2015 World Championships 3,000 metres Steeplechase 26th overall (11th in heat 2) 9:43.73
2015 World Cross Ctry Cross Country (8 km) 40/83 40th 29:11

2016 Olympic Games 3,000 metres steeplechase 29th overall (10th in heat) 9:39.40

2017 World Championships 3,000 metres steeplechase 33rd overall (11th in heat) 10:00.40

2018 Commonwealth Games 3,000 metres steeplechase 9th Overall 10:12.59

=== National competition ===
2000 Aust. Junior Cross Ctry Junior XC (6 km) 2 23:05.0
2000-01 Aust. Junior T & F 2,000 metres Steeplechase 1 6:50.90
2001 Aust. Junior Cross Ctry Junior XC (6 km) 3 22:20.0
2001-02 Aust. T & F 3,000 metres Steeplechase 2 10:36.98
2002-03 Aust. T & F 3,000 metres Steeplechase 1 10:20.60
2003 Aust. U23 Cross Country Cross Country (8 km) 4 (3rd Aust.) 29:48
2005-06 Aust. T & F 3,000 metres Steeplechase 4 (3rd Aust.) 9:44.06
2007-08 Aust. T & F 3,000 metres Steeplechase 3 10:03.35
2010-11 Aust. T & F 3,000 metres Steeplechase 1 10:10.66
2011-12 Aust. T & F 3,000 metres Steeplechase 2 10:08.91
2013-14 Aust. T & F 3,000 metres Steeplechase 1 9:42.01
2014-15 Aust. T & F 5,000 metres 4 (2nd Aust.) 15:45.72
