= 2005 IAAF World Athletics Final =

International track and field competition

The 3rd IAAF World Athletics Final was held at the Stade Louis II, in Fontvieille, Monaco on September 9, and September 10, 2005.

The hammer throw event for men and women had to take place in Szombathely, Hungary on September 3 as the Monaco stadium was not large enough to hold the event.

== Medal summary ==
=== Men ===
Event	Gold	Silver	Bronze
100 m	Marc Burns; Trinidad and Tobago	Aziz Zakari; Ghana	Dwight Thomas; Jamaica
200 m	Tyson Gay; United States	Christopher Williams; Jamaica	Wallace Spearmon; United States
400 m	Tyree Washington; United States	Timothy Benjamin; Great Britain	Chris Brown; Bahamas
800 m	Wilfred Bungei; Kenya	Yusuf Saad Kamel; Bahrain	Yuriy Borzakovskiy; Russia
1,500 m	Ivan Heshko; Ukraine	Bernard Lagat; United States	Alex Kipchirchir; Kenya
3000 m	Bernard Lagat; United States	Eliud Kipchoge; Kenya	Augustine Kiprono Choge; Kenya
5000 m	Sileshi Sihine; Ethiopia	Boniface Kiprop; Uganda	Isaac Kiprono Songok; Kenya
110 m hurdles	Allen Johnson; United States	Dominique Arnold; United States	Terrence Trammell; United States
400 m hurdles	Bershawn Jackson; United States	Kemel Thompson; Jamaica	L.J. van Zyl; South Africa
3000 m s'chase	Paul Kipsiele Koech; Kenya	Ezekiel Kemboi; Kenya	Brimin Kipruto; Kenya
Long jump	Dwight Phillips; United States	Miguel Pate; United States	James Beckford; Jamaica
Triple jump	Yoandri Betanzos; Cuba	Jádel Gregório; Brazil	Walter Davis; United States
High jump	Víctor Moya; Cuba	Vyacheslav Voronin; Russia	Yaroslav Rybakov; Russia Stefan Holm; Sweden
Pole vault	Brad Walker; United States	Tim Lobinger; Germany	Igor Pavlov; Russia Giuseppe Gibilisco; Italy
Shot put	Adam Nelson; United States	Joachim Olsen; Denmark	Reese Hoffa; United States
Discus throw	Virgilijus Alekna; Lithuania	Gerd Kanter; Estonia	Zoltán Kővágó; Hungary
Javelin throw	Tero Pitkämäki; Finland	Andreas Thorkildsen; Norway	Sergey Makarov; Russia
Hammer throw	Olli-Pekka Karjalainen; Finland	Vadim Devyatovskiy; Belarus	Krisztián Pars; Hungary

=== Women ===
Event	Gold		Silver		Bronze	
100 m	Veronica Campbell; Jamaica		Christine Arron; France		Lauryn Williams; United States	
200 m	Allyson Felix; United States		Veronica Campbell; Jamaica		Christine Arron; France	
400 m	Sanya Richards; United States		Tonique Williams-Darling; Bahamas		DeeDee Trotter; United States	
800 m	Zulia Calatayud; Cuba		Hasna Benhassi; Morocco		Mayte Martínez; Spain	
1500 m	Maryam Yusuf Jamal; Bahrain		Tatyana Tomashova; Russia		Natalya Yevdokimova; Russia	
3000 m	Meseret Defar; Ethiopia		Gelete Burika; Ethiopia		Zakia Mrisho Mohamed; Tanzania	
5000 m	Meseret Defar; Ethiopia		Tirunesh Dibaba; Ethiopia		Berhane Adere; Ethiopia	
100 m hurdles	Michelle Perry; United States		Brigitte Foster-Hylton; Jamaica		Delloreen Ennis-London; Jamaica	
400 m hurdles	Lashinda Demus; United States		Yuliya Pechonkina; Russia		Sandra Glover; United States	
3000 m s'chase	Docus Inzikuru; Uganda		Wioletta Janowska; Poland		Mardrea Hyman; Jamaica	
Long jump	Anju Bobby George; India	6.75 m	Grace Upshaw; United States	6.67 m	Eunice Barber; France	6.51 m
Triple jump	Hrysopiyi Devetzi; Greece		Tatyana Lebedeva; Russia		Yargelis Savigne; Cuba	
High jump	Kajsa Bergqvist; Sweden	2.00 m	Iryna Mykhalchenko; Ukraine	1.93 m	Vita Palamar; Ukraine	1.93 m
Pole vault	Yelena Isinbayeva; Russia		Monika Pyrek; Poland		Tatyana Polnova; Russia	
Shot put	Valerie Vili; New Zealand	19.55 m	Natallia Kharaneka; Belarus	18.80 m	Olga Ryabinkina; Russia	18.64 m
Discus throw	Natalya Sadova; Russia		Franka Dietzsch; Germany		Aretha Thurmond; United States	
Javelin throw	Osleidys Menéndez; Cuba		Steffi Nerius; Germany		Sonia Bisset; Cuba	
Hammer throw	Yipsi Moreno; Cuba		Kamila Skolimowska; Poland		Olga Kuzenkova; Russia	

== See also ==
- 2005 in athletics (track and field)
