= List of stripped European Athletics Championships medals =

The following is a list of stripped medals at the European Athletics Championships.

== IAAF Rule 32.2.a ==
RULE 32 – Anti-Doping Rule Violations
1. Doping is defined as the occurrence of one or more of the anti-doping rule violations set out in Rule 32.2 of these Anti-Doping Rules.
2. Athletes or other Persons shall be responsible for knowing what constitutes an anti-doping rule violation and the substances and methods which have been included on the Prohibited List. The following constitute anti-doping rule violations:

(a) Presence of a Prohibited Substance or its Metabolites or Markers in an Athlete's Sample.

== Stripped of European Championships medals ==
=== 2010 Barcelona ===
At the 2010 European Athletics Championships 14 medals was stripped, 3 men and 11 women.

Event	Medal	Disqualified	Country	Variation date	Notes	New Podium	Original rank
Men's 3000 m steeplechase	3rd place, bronze medalist(s)	José Luis Blanco	Spain	1 February 2011		(bronze) (Moldova) Ion Luchianov	4
Men's shot put	1st place, gold medalist(s)	Andrei Mikhnevich	Belarus	31 July 2013		(gold) (Poland) Tomasz Majewski; (silver) (Germany) Ralf Bartels; (bronze) (Latvia) Māris Urtāns	(silver) (bronze); 4
Men's 20 km race walk	1st place, gold medalist(s)	Stanislav Emelyanov	Russia	30 July 2014		(gold) (Italy) Alex Schwazer; (silver) (Portugal) João Vieira; (bronze) (Republic of Ireland) Robert Heffernan	(silver) (bronze); 4
Women's 800 m	1st place, gold medalist(s)	Mariya Savinova	Russia	10 February 2017		(gold) (Netherlands) Yvonne Hak; (silver) (United Kingdom) Jennifer Meadows; (bronze) (Slovakia) Lucia Klocová	(silver) (bronze); 4
Women's 5000 m	1st place, gold medalist(s)	Alemitu Bekele	Turkey	30 December 2012		(gold) (Turkey) Elvan Abeylegesse; (silver) (Portugal) Sara Moreira; (bronze) (Portugal) Jéssica Augusto	(silver) (bronze); 4
Women's 10,000 m	2nd place, silver medalist(s)	Inga Abitova	Russia	11 October 2012		(silver) (Portugal) Jéssica Augusto; (bronze) (Netherlands) Hilda Kibet	(bronze); 4
Women's marathon	1st place, gold medalist(s)	Živile Balciunaite	Lithuania	5 April 2011		(gold) (Italy) Anna Incerti; (silver) (Ukraine) Tetyana Filonyuk; (bronze) (Sweden) Isabellah Andersson	(bronze); 4; 5
Women's marathon	2nd place, silver medalist(s)	Nailya Yulamanova	Russia	3 July 2012		(gold) (Italy) Anna Incerti; (silver) (Ukraine) Tetyana Filonyuk; (bronze) (Sweden) Isabellah Andersson	(bronze); 4; 5
Women's 20 kn race walk	1st place, gold medalist(s)	Olga Kaniskina	Russia	25 January 2015		(gold) (Russia) Anisya Kirdyapkina; (silver) (Russia) Vera Sokolova; (bronze) (Germany) Melanie Seeger	(silver) (bronze); 4
Women's 3000 m steeplechase	2nd place, silver medalist(s)	Marta Domínguez	Spain	19 November 2015		(silver) (United Kingdom) Hatti Dean; (bronze) (Poland) Wioletta Frankiewicz	4; 5
Women's 3000 m steeplechase	3rd place, bronze medalist(s)	Lyubov Kharlamova	Russia	2 August 2017		(silver) (United Kingdom) Hatti Dean; (bronze) (Poland) Wioletta Frankiewicz	4; 5
Women's 4 × 400 m relay	1st place, gold medalist(s)	Anastasiya Kapachinskaya; Antonina Krivoshapka; Kseniya Ustalova; Tatyana Firova	Russia	25 July 2012		(gold) Germany; Fabienne Kohlmann; Esther Cremer; Janin Lindenberg; Claudia Hoffmann; (silver) Great Britain; Nicola Sanders; Marilyn Okoro; Lee McConnell; Perri Shakes-Drayton; (bronze) Italy; Chiara Bazzoni; Marta Milani; Maria Enrica Spacca; Libania Grenot	(silver) (bronze) 4
Women's Shot put	1st place, gold medalist(s)	Nadzeya Ostapchuk	Belarus	12 January 2017		(gold) (Russia) Anna Avdeyeva; (silver) (Belarus) Janina Karolchyk; (bronze) (Russia) Olga Ivanova	(bronze); 4; 5
Women's Shot put	2nd place, silver medalist(s)	Natallia Mikhnevich	Belarus	12 January 2017		(gold) (Russia) Anna Avdeyeva; (silver) (Belarus) Janina Karolchyk; (bronze) (Russia) Olga Ivanova	(bronze); 4; 5

=== 2012 Helsinki ===
At the 2012 European Athletics Championships 9 medals were stripped, 1 man and 8 women.

Event	Medal	Disqualified	Country	Variation date	Notes	New Podium	Original rank
Men's discus throw	3rd place, bronze medalist(s)	Zoltán Kővágó	Hungary	26 July 2012		(bronze) (Netherlands) Rutger Smith	4
Women's 800 m	1st place, gold medalist(s)	Elena Arzhakova	Russia	29 January 2013		(gold) (United Kingdom) Lynsey Sharp; (silver) (Belarus) Maryna Arzamasova; (bronze) (Ukraine) Liliya Lobanova	(silver); 4; 5
Women's 800 m	3rd place, bronze medalist(s)	Irina Maracheva	Russia	25 January 2016		(gold) (United Kingdom) Lynsey Sharp; (silver) (Belarus) Maryna Arzamasova; (bronze) (Ukraine) Liliya Lobanova	(silver); 4; 5
Women's 1500 m	1st place, gold medalist(s)	Aslı Çakır Alptekin	Turkey	17 August 2015		(gold) (Spain) Nuria Fernández; (silver) (Germany) Diana Sujew; (bronze) (Czech Republic) Tereza Čapková	5; 6; 7
Women's 1500 m	2nd place, silver medalist(s)	Gamze Bulut	Turkey	1 June 2016		(gold) (Spain) Nuria Fernández; (silver) (Germany) Diana Sujew; (bronze) (Czech Republic) Tereza Čapková	5; 6; 7
Women's 1500 m	3rd place, bronze medalist(s)	Anna Mishchenko	Ukraine	26 February 2016		(gold) (Spain) Nuria Fernández; (silver) (Germany) Diana Sujew; (bronze) (Czech Republic) Tereza Čapková	5; 6; 7
Women's 1500 m	4th	Yekaterina Ishova	Russia			(gold) (Spain) Nuria Fernández; (silver) (Germany) Diana Sujew; (bronze) (Czech Republic) Tereza Čapková	5; 6; 7
Women's 3000 m steeplechase	2nd place, silver medalist(s)	Svitlana Shmidt	Ukraine	12 April 2015		(silver) (Germany) Antje Möldner-Schmidt; (bronze) (Germany) Gesa Felicitas Krause	(bronze); 4
Women's 100 m hurdles	1st place, gold medalist(s)	Nevin Yanit	Turkey	29 August 2013		(gold) (Belarus) Alina Talay; (silver) (Belarus) Katsiaryna Paplauskaya; (bronze) (Austria) Beate Schrott	(silver) (bronze); 4
Women's heptathlon	2nd place, silver medalist(s)	Lyudmyla Yosypenko	Ukraine	30 December 2012		(silver) (Latvia) Laura Ikauniece; (bronze) (Latvia) Aiga Grabuste	(bronze); 4

=== 2014 Zürich ===
At the 2014 European Athletics Championships 1 medals was stripped, 1 men and 0 women.

Event	Medal	Disqualified	Country	Variation date	Notes	New Podium	Original rank
Men's 4 × 400 m relay	2nd place, silver medalist(s)	Maksim Dyldin; Pavel Ivashko; Nikita Uglov; Vladimir Krasnov	Russia			(silver) Poland; Rafał Omelko; Kacper Kozłowski; Łukasz Krawczuk; Jakub Krzewina; (bronze) France; Mame-Ibra Anne, Teddy Venel; Mamoudou Hanne; Thomas Jordier	(bronze) 4

=== 2016 Amsterdam ===
At the 2016 European Athletics Championships 0 medals was stripped as of 29 August 2018.

=== 2018 Berlin ===
At the 2018 European Athletics Championships 0 medals was stripped as of 29 August 2018.

== See also ==
- List of doping cases in athletics
- List of stripped Olympic medals
- Doping at the World Championships in Athletics
