= Rosa Morató =

Rosa María Morató (born June 19, 1979, in Navarcles) is a Spanish runner who specializes in the steeplechase. She finished eighth at the 2007 World Championships. She represented Spain in the steeplechase at the 2008 Summer Olympics. Her personal best time is 9:26.23 minutes, which she achieved in July 2007 in Heusden-Zolder, Belgium. She holds the Spanish record over 10 km, with a time of 32:06 minutes at the 2009 San Silvestre de Barcelona.

She has frequently reached the top ten in the women's race at the annual European Cross Country Championships. She took the individual bronze medal and team gold (alongside fellow steeplechaser Marta Domínguez) at the 2007 European Cross Country Championships and took the silver medal at the 2009 edition, leading the Spanish women to the team bronze.

Morató won her first international steeplechase medal at the 2010 Ibero-American Championships in San Fernando, Cádiz, where she defeated Zulema Fuentes-Pila to win the gold medal in a championship record. She then took a silver medal in the 2010 European Team Championships, beaten only by Yuliya Zarudneva. Morató just missed out on qualification for the steeplechase final at the 2010 European Athletics Championships later that summer. In the buildup to the 2010 European Cross Country Championships, she was the runner-up at the Cross de Soria, finishing three seconds behind Dina Lebo Phalula, and also took second at the Cross Internacional Valle de Llodio. She missed the championships, however, due to a hamstring injury.

== Achievements ==
| Year | Competition | Venue | Position | Event | Notes |
Representing Spain
| 2005 | World Championships | Helsinki, Finland | 9th (heats) | 3000 m st. | |
| 2006 | European Championships | Gothenburg, Sweden | 7th (semis) | 3000 m st. | |
| 2007 | World Championships | Osaka, Japan | 8th | 3000 m st. | |
| 2008 | Olympic Games | Beijing, China | 12th (heats) | 3000 m st. | |
| 2010 | Ibero-American Championships | San Fernando, Spain | 1st | 3000 m st. | 9:40.26 |
| 2010 | European Team Championships | Bergen, Norway | 2nd | 3000 m st. | |
| 2010 | European Championships | Barcelona, Spain | 6th (heats) | 3000 m st. | |
