= Athletics at the 1995 Summer Universiade – Women's 1500 metres =

The women's 1500 metres event at the 1995 Summer Universiade was held on 2–3 September at the Hakatanomori Athletic Stadium in Fukuoka, Japan.

== Medalists ==
Gold	Silver	Bronze
Gabriela Szabo; Romania	Julianne Henner; United States	Ursula Friedmann; Germany

== Results ==
=== Heats ===
Qualification: First 4 of each heat (Q) and the next 4 fastest (q) qualified for the final.

Rank	Heat	Athlete	Nationality	Time	Notes
1	2	Carlien Cornelissen	South Africa	4:14.80	Q
2	2	Elisa Rea	Italy	4:14.87	Q
3	1	Gabriela Szabo	Romania	4:14.99	Q
4	2	Angela Davies	Great Britain	4:15.05	Q
5	2	Ursula Friedmann	Germany	4:15.31	Q
6	2	Julianne Henner	United States	4:15.32	q
7	1	Frédérique Quentin	France	4:15.44	Q
8	1	Minori Hayakari	Japan	4:15.57	Q
9	1	Mélanie Choinière	Canada	4:15.81	Q
10	2	Yumi Sato	Japan	4:15.85	q
11	1	Serenella Sbrissa	Italy	4:16.35	q
12	1	Lidiya Vasilevskaya	Russia	4:17.18	q
13	2	Denisa Costescu	Romania	4:18.88	
14	1	Stephanie Graf	Austria	4:20.09	
15	1	Monika Ronnholm	Finland	4:21.51	
16	1	Joline Staeheli	United States	4:23.17	
17	2	Sarah Howell	Canada	4:25.92	
18	2	Doaa Sleman	Israel	4:28.61	
19	1	Clara Morales	Chile	4:36.71	
20	1	Sarah Kekana	South Africa	4:39.68	
21	1	Cheong Tsui Fong	Singapore	4:40.25	
22	2	Cheong Tsui Ying	Singapore	4:47.28	
23	2	Martha Portobanco	Nicaragua	4:55.87	
	2	Jane Kiptum	Kenya	DNS	
	2	Charmaine Thomas	Antigua and Barbuda	DNS	

=== Final ===
Rank	Athlete	Nationality	Time	Notes
1st place, gold medalist(s)	Gabriela Szabo	Romania	4:11.73	
2nd place, silver medalist(s)	Julianne Henner	United States	4:12.70	
3rd place, bronze medalist(s)	Ursula Friedmann	Germany	4:13.32	
4	Carlien Cornelissen	South Africa	4:13.70	
5	Elisa Rea	Italy	4:14.09	
6	Minori Hayakari	Japan	4:16.12	
7	Angela Davies	Great Britain	4:16.75	
8	Mélanie Choinière	Canada	4:18.08	
9	Serenella Sbrissa	Italy	4:19.50	
10	Frédérique Quentin	France	4:19.60	
11	Yumi Sato	Japan	4:19.75	
	Lidiya Vasilevskaya	Russia	DNF	
