= Alemayehu Bezabeh =

Spanish athlete (born c. 1986)

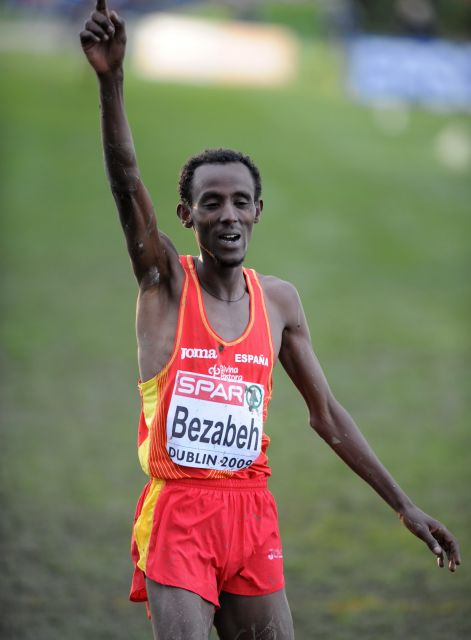
- Bezabeh at the 2009 European Cross Country Championships

Personal information
- Full name: Alemayehu Bezabeh Desta
- Citizenship: Spanish (from 2008)
- Born: circa 1986 Addis Ababa, Ethiopia

Sport
- Sport: Athletics
- Events: Middle-distance; Long-distance; Cross country
Medal record
Men's athletics
Representing Spain
European Cross Country Championships
| Gold medal – first place | 2008 Brussels | Team |
| Gold medal – first place | 2009 Dublin | Individual |
| Gold medal – first place | 2009 Dublin | Team |
| Gold medal – first place | 2013 Belgrade | Individual |
| Gold medal – first place | 2013 Belgrade | Team |
| Gold medal – first place | 2015 Hyères | Team |
| Silver medal – second place | 2014 Samokov | Team |
| Silver medal – second place | 2015 Hyères | Individual |
| Bronze medal – third place | 2014 Samokov | Individual |

Alemayehu Bezabeh Desta (Amharic: አለማየሁ በዛበህ ደስታ; born c. 1986) is an athlete who competes in middle- and long-distance running on the track, and also in cross country. Born in Ethiopia, he represents Spain internationally. His brother, Sisay Bezabeh, is also a professional runner and represents Australia internationally.

In December 2010 Alemayehu Bezabeh was arrested as part of Operation Galgo, an investigation by the Spanish Guardia Civil into an alleged doping ring among athletes in Spain, having been caught red-handed carrying a bag of his own blood for a blood transfusion.

== Biography ==
=== Arrival in Spain ===
Born in Addis Ababa, Alemayehu Bezabeh arrived in Spain in 2004 via plane and stayed in the country as an illegal immigrant, sleeping outdoors and dreaming of becoming a professional runner. He began living off the winnings of the races he would take part in every week. Following a calf injury, doctors at a hospital in the Community of Madrid discovered that he had no papers and he did not know his date of birth.

X-ray wrist tests revealed him to be over 18 and after some estimations of his age he was given a nominal birthday of 1 January 1986. The test involved examination of the proportions of the individual bones of a wrist; it provides an estimate of biological age of a growing body, but is not informative for an age above 18 (male) when the bone growth saturates. As a result of his strong running skills, Bezabeh was given naturalised citizen status in 2008 to allow him to compete internationally for Spain.

=== Start of running career ===
His first major competition for Spain was the 2008 Beijing Olympics and he reached the final of the men's 5000 metres race, taking eleventh place. After a win at the Cross de Atapuerca, he also performed well at the 2008 European Cross Country Championships, finishing in seventh and leading the Spanish team to the gold with the help of Ayad Lamdassem. At the end of the year he won the Cross Internacional de Venta de Baños, finishing ahead of Lamdassem and Kidane Tadese.

The following year he won the Spanish cross country championships and ran in the 2009 IAAF World Cross Country Championships, finishing just outside the top thirty. He also competed at the 2009 World Championships in Athletics but he failed to make the 5000 m final. Despite this setback, the year turned out to be his breakthrough season as he won the men's senior 10 km race at the 2009 European Cross Country Championships. He fought off former champions Serhiy Lebid and Mo Farah, and went on to become the first Spanish champion in the history of the competition.

At the 2010 IAAF World Cross Country Championships he was fourteenth overall. A 5000 m silver medal at the 2010 European Team Championships boded well for the 2010 European Athletics Championships in Barcelona, but he was ten seconds off his compatriot Jesús España, who took silver. He was fourth at the Atapuerca race which began the 2010/11 cross country season. He was set to defend his title at the 2010 European Cross Country Championships in December but abruptly withdrew after he was arrested.

=== Doping case ===
On 9 December 2010 Alemayehu was arrested as part of Operation Galgo, an investigation by the Spanish Guardia Civil into a large-scale doping ring among athletes in Spain centred on the disgraced Spanish doctor Eufemiano Fuentes and the Spanish running star Marta Dominguez, who was arrested on suspicion of trafficking in drugs. He confessed to his involvement in the alleged doping ring after having been surprised by the Guardia Civil in the company of the top Spanish coach Manuel Pascua Piqueras and the retired competitive mountain-biker Alberto León, when he was caught red-handed carrying a bag of his own blood which he was intending to use for an illegal autotransfusion to improve his athletic performance. The Real Federación Española de Atletismo immediately withdrew Alemayehu from the Spanish team that was due to compete on 12 December 2010 in the European Cross Country Championships in Portugal, where he would have been the defending champion.

In March 2011 he was cleared by the national federation of charges for attempted doping, as its committee declared that there was not sufficient evidence against him. The federation president, José María Odriozola, accepted Bezabeh's version of events – that he believed León was a medic who was analysing his blood for a liver problem. However, Spain's sports disciplinary committee overturned the verdict in June 2011, and banned Alemayehu from sports for 2 years.

=== Return to running ===
Alemayehu's doping suspension ended in January 2013 and he immediately returned on the cross country running circuit. In March he made his debut over the half marathon and set a best of 64:54 minutes for fifth at the Tarsus Half Marathon. He had two international outings over 5000 m that year, taking eighth at the 2013 European Team Championships and running in the heats of the 2013 World Championships in Athletics. He was runner-up at the Cross de Soria in November to Ugandan Dickson Huru. On 8 December 2013, Bezabeh won the 2013 European Cross Country Championships in a time of 29.11.

== Personal bests ==
| Surface | Event | Time (m:s) | Venue | Date |
|---|---|---|---|---|
| Track | 1500 m | 3:39.85 | Huelva, Spain | 9 June 2010 |
| Track | 3000 m | 7:45.98 | Huelva, Spain | 7 June 2005 |
| Track | 5000 m | 12:57.25 | Oslo, Norway | 4 June 2010 |
| Road | 10 km | 28:39 | Madrid, Spain | 19 November 2006 |

- All information taken from IAAF profile.
