= 2006 European Athletics Championships – Women's 3000 metres steeplechase =

Kunal singh

Women's 3000 metres steeplechase at the European Athletics Championships

The women's 3000 metres steeplechase at the 2006 European Athletics Championships were held at the Ullevi on August 10 and August 12.

This event was the first women's steeplechase event in the European Athletics Championships. Belurusian athlete Alesia Turava took the win three days after her sister had won 20 km walking competition.

== Medalists ==
Gold	Silver	Bronze
Alesia Turava; Belarus	Tatyana Petrova; Russia	Wioletta Janowska; Poland

== Schedule ==
Date	Time	Round
August 10, 2006	10:05	Semifinals
August 12, 2006	16:15	Final

== Results ==
KEY:	q	Fastest non-qualifiers	Q	Qualified	NR	National record	PB	Personal best	SB	Seasonal best

=== Semifinals ===
First 4 in each heat (Q) and the next 4 fastest (q) advance to the Final.

Rank	Heat	Name	Nationality	Time	Notes
1	2	Alesia Turava	Belarus	9:37.01	Q
2	2	Wioletta Janowska	Poland	9:37.39	Q
3	2	Veerle Dejaeghere	Belgium	9:37.64	Q
4	2	Yelena Sidorchenkova	Russia	9:38.53	Q
5	2	Ida Nilsson	Sweden	9:40.31	q, NR
6	2	Élodie Olivarès	France	9:41.25	q, SB
7	2	Cristina Casandra	Romania	9:41.63	q
8	1	Tatyana Petrova	Russia	9:42.08	Q
9	1	Lyubov Ivanova	Russia	9:42.32	Q
10	1	Katarzyna Kowalska	Poland	9:42.50	Q, PB
11	1	Zulema Fuentes-Pila	Spain	9:43.12	Q, PB
12	2	Miranda Boonstra	Netherlands	9:45.87	q, NR
13	1	Roisin McGettigan	Ireland	9:47.37	
14	2	Diana Martín	Spain	9:47.52	PB
15	1	Lívia Tóth	Hungary	9:48.10	
16	2	Verena Dreier	Germany	9:48.90	PB
17	2	Fionnuala Britton	Ireland	9:49.20	PB
18	1	Rosa Morató	Spain	9:52.02	
19	2	Elena Romagnolo	Italy	9:52.38	NR
20	1	Hatti Dean	United Kingdom	9:52.97	
21	2	Iríni Kokkinaríou	Greece	9:53.07	NR
22	1	Rasa Troup	Lithuania	9:53.14	
23	1	Christin Johansson	Sweden	9:58.37	
24	1	Agnes Tschurtschenthaler	Italy	10:00.09	
25	1	Ebba Stenbäck Morrison	Sweden	10:00.36	
26	1	Dobrinka Shalamanova	Bulgaria	10:01.56	
27	1	Marzena Michalska	Italy	10:11.21	
28	2	Türkan Erismis	Turkey	10:21.36	
29	1	Louise Mørch	Denmark	10:29.12	SB
30	1	Andrea Deelstra	Netherlands	10:46.12	
	2	Inês Monteiro	Portugal		DNF

=== Final ===
Rank	Name	Nationality	Time	Notes
1st place, gold medalist(s)	Alesia Turava	Belarus	9:26.05	CR
2nd place, silver medalist(s)	Tatyana Petrova	Russia	9:28.05	
3rd place, bronze medalist(s)	Wioletta Janowska	Poland	9:31.62	
4	Lyubov Ivanova	Russia	9:33.53	
5	Veerle Dejaeghere	Belgium	9:35.78	
6	Yelena Sidorchenkova	Russia	9:38.05	
7	Ida Nilsson	Sweden	9:39.24	NR
8	Zulema Fuentes-Pila	Spain	9:40.36	NR
9	Katarzyna Kowalska	Poland	9:42.89	
10	Cristina Casandra	Romania	9:42.94	
11	Élodie Olivarès	France	9:52.69	
12	Miranda Boonstra	Netherlands	10:20.01	
