= Athletics at the 2007 Summer Universiade – Women's 3000 metres steeplechase =

The women's 3000 metres steeplechase event at the 2007 Summer Universiade was held on 12 August.

== Results ==
Rank	Name	Nationality	Time	Notes
1st place, gold medalist(s)	Dobrinka Shalamanova	Bulgaria	9:45.04	
2nd place, silver medalist(s)	Valentyna Horpynych	Ukraine	9:45.55	
3rd place, bronze medalist(s)	Türkan Erişmiş	Turkey	9:46.12	PB
4	Sara Moreira	Portugal	9:46.70	
5	Natalia Izmodenova	Russia	9:58.45	
6	Diana Martín	Spain	10:05.22	
7	Biljana Jović	Serbia	10:10.84	
8	Talis Apud	Mexico	10:13.33	
9	Marcela Lustigová	Czech Republic	10:13.58	
10	Julia Hiller	Germany	10:21.88	
11	Emma Quaglia	Italy	10:24.67	
12	Jekaterina Patjuk	Estonia	10:30.03	
13	Amanda King	New Zealand	10:36.74	
14	Liu Nian	China	10:41.08	
	Ljiljana Ćulibrk	Croatia	DNF	
	Oxana Juravel	Moldova	DNF	
	María Teresa Urbina	Spain	DNF	
