= 2003 European Athletics U23 Championships – Women's 3000 metres steeplechase =

The women's 3000 metres steeplechase event at the 2003 European Athletics U23 Championships was held in Bydgoszcz, Poland, at Zawisza Stadion on 19 July.

== Medalists ==
Gold	Lyubov Ivanova; Russia
Silver	Michaela Mannová; Czech Republic
Bronze	Sigrid Vanden Bempt; Belgium

== Results ==
=== Final ===
19 July

Rank	Name	Nationality	Time	Notes
1st place, gold medalist(s)	Lyubov Ivanova	Russia	9:41.16	CR
2nd place, silver medalist(s)	Michaela Mannová	Czech Republic	9:42.01	
3rd place, bronze medalist(s)	Sigrid Vanden Bempt	Belgium	9:42.04	
4	Alina Proca	Romania	9:48.15	
5	Ida Nilsson	Sweden	10:00.27	
6	Valeriya Mara	Ukraine	10:09.52	
7	Julia Budniak	Poland	10:13.56	
8	Gwendoline Despres	France	10:13.98	
9	Sophie Duarte	France	10:17.76	
10	Alba García	Spain	10:21.99	
11	Jo Ankier	Great Britain	10:22.13	
12	Kadri Kelve	Estonia	10:22.27	
13	Valentyna Horpynych	Ukraine	10:26.65	
14	Louise Mørch	Denmark	10:26.86	
15	Jolanda Verstraten	Netherlands	10:32.39	
16	Barbara Parker	Great Britain	10:36.78	
17	Diana Martín	Spain	10:51.20	

== Participation ==
According to an unofficial count, 17 athletes from 13 countries participated in the event.

- Belgium (1)
- Czech Republic (1)
- Denmark (1)
- Estonia (1)
- France (2)
- Great Britain (2)
- Netherlands (1)
- Poland (1)
- Romania (1)
- Russia (1)
- Spain (2)
- Sweden (1)
- Ukraine (2)
