= Hatti Archer =

British long-distance runner

Hatti Archer née Dean
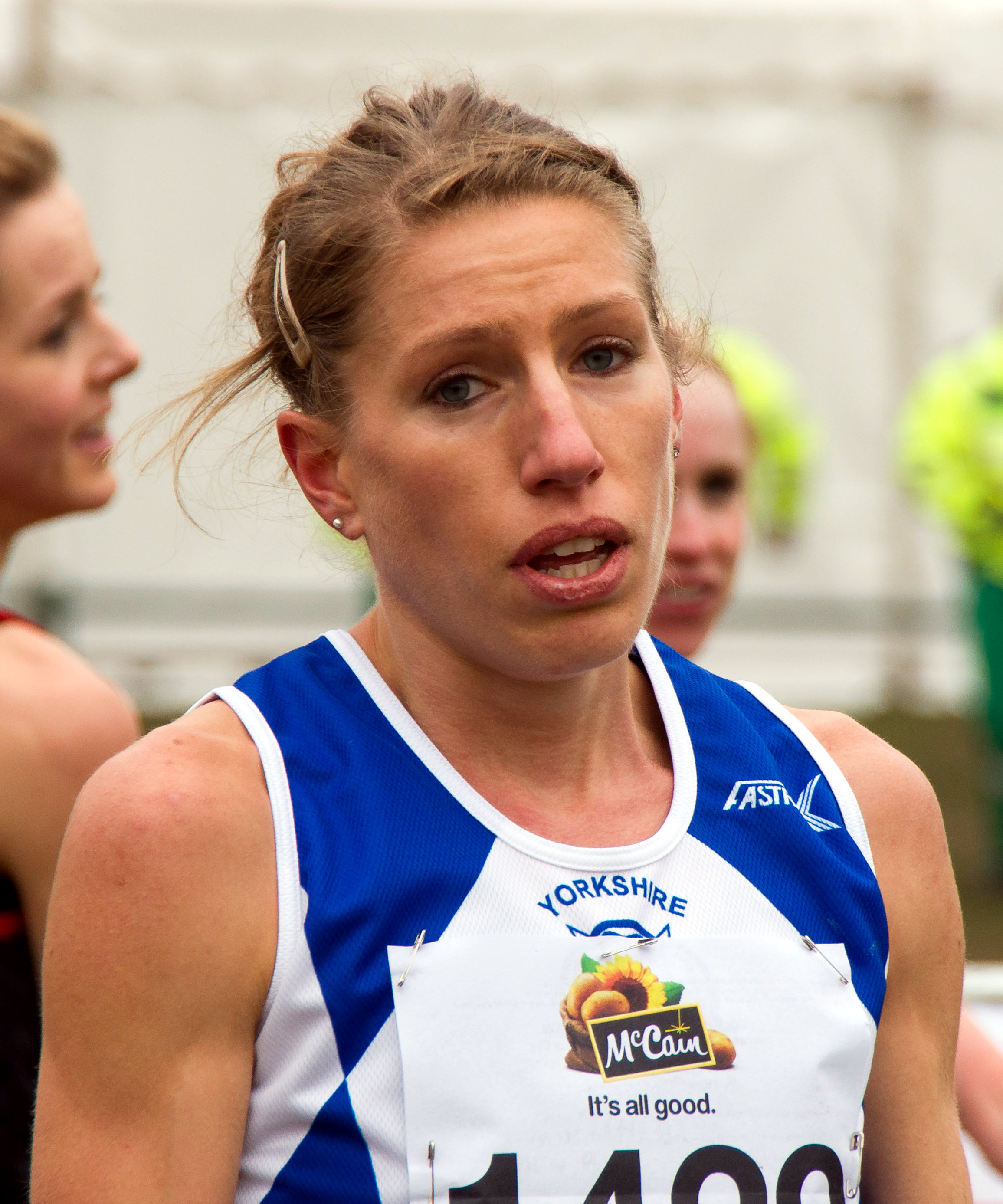
- Hatti Dean at the UK Inter Counties cross country in 2011.

Personal information
- Born: 2 February 1982 (age 44) Oxford, Oxfordshire, England
- Height: 1.65 m (5 ft 5 in)
- Weight: 51 kg (112 lb; 8.0 st)

Sport
- Club: Hallamshire Harriers
Medal record
Women's athletics
Representing Great Britain
European Championships
Silver medal – second place	2010 Barcelona	3000 m steeplechase

Harriet Archer (née Dean; born 2 February 1982) is a British former long-distance runner who competed in cross country and steeplechase.

== Athletics career ==
Dean set three British national records in the 3000 metres steeplechase in 2007, most notably at a rain soaked event at Don Valley Stadium in July of that year. She competed at five World Cross Country Championships between 2005 and 2011, with her best result being 15th in Mombasa in 2007. She finished in the top ten at the European Cross Country Championships in 2008 (8th) and 2010 (7th), an event at which she has also won four team medals.

Archer earned selection in the 3000 metres steeplechase for the 2008 Olympic Games in Beijing, but was unable to compete due to a stress fracture to her ankle. In July 2010, she ran in the 3000 metres steeplechase at the European Championships in Barcelona, finishing fourth in the final in a time of 9:30.19, eight seconds quicker than her previous best.

Marta Domínguez, who finished second in the race was disqualified in November 2015 due to doping offences, handed a three-year ban and stripped of all medals and results achieved between 5 August 2009, and 8 July 2013.

Yuliya Zaripova of Russia who won the race in Barcelona, and went on to win world and Olympic titles in 2011 and 2012, was also subsequently handed a doping suspension. Third finisher, Lyubov Kharlamova of Russia, also served a two-year ban after testing positive in 2006. Archer was upgraded to the bronze medal, with Kharlamova promoted to silver, after second-place finisher Domínguez was disqualified in November 2015. Archer was further upgraded to the silver medal after Kharlamova was disqualified in August 2017. The silver medal for Archer represented the best British result in the history of the event.

She represented Great Britain in the World Mountain Running Championships in 2016, finishing in tenth place.

== Personal life ==
Born Harriet Emily Dean in Oxford, England, Archer was educated at the Dragon School and St Helen and St Katharine School in Abingdon, Oxfordshire. She married fellow distance runner Dave Archer in 2012. They have a daughter, born in 2014, and a son, born in 2017.

== Personal bests ==
- 1500 m: 4:16.57
- 3000 m: 8:58.77
- 3000 m steeplechase: 9:30.19
- 5000 m: 16:06.53
- 10,000 m: 33.31.76
- 10 km road: 33:28

== National titles ==
- 2006 UK national 3000 metres steeplechase champion (2nd in 2010, 2012)
- 2009 English national cross country champion (2nd in 2011, 3rd in 2010)

Note: The 2006 UK Championships and AAAs of England Championships were incorporated into one event.

== International competitions ==
- All non-cross-country results are at 3000 metres steeplechase.

Year	Competition	Venue	Position	Notes
Representing United Kingdom
2005	World Cross Country Championships	Saint-Galmier, France	47th	Short-race
2006	World Cross Country Championships	Fukuoka, Japan	66th	
2006	European Championships	Gothenburg, Sweden	heats	9:52.97
2007	World Cross Country Championships	Mombasa, Kenya	15th	
2007	World Championships	Osaka, Japan	heats	9:43.23
2007	European Cross Country Championships	Toro, Spain	26th	
2008	European Cross Country Championships	Brussels, Belgium	8th	
2009	World Cross Country Championships	Amman, Jordan	49th	
2010	European Cross Country Championships	Albufeira, Portugal	7th	
2010	European Championships	Barcelona, Spain	2nd	9:30.19
2010	Continental Cup	Split, Croatia	7th	9:45.36
2011	World Cross Country Championships	Punta Umbria, Spain	21st	
2011	European Cross Country Championships	Velenje, Slovenia	18th	
2012	European Championships	Helsinki, Finland	heats	9:57.00

Note: In the European Cross Country Championships listed above, Archer has won four team medals, three silver (07,08,10) and one gold (2011).
