= Martha Portobanco =

Nicaraguan long-distance runner

Personal information
- Nationality: Nicaraguan
- Born: 29 January 1971 (age 55) Managua, Nicaragua

Sport
- Sport: Long-distance running
- Event: 5000 metres
Medal record
Women's athletics
Representing Nicaragua
Central American Games
Bronze medal – third place	1990 Tegucigalpa	4 × 400 m relay
Silver medal – second place	1994 San Salvador	4 × 400 m relay

Martha Lorena Portobanco Rivas (born 29 January 1971) is a Nicaraguan long-distance runner. She competed in the women's 5000 metres at the 1996 Summer Olympics.

Portobanco won two Central American Games medals as a member of the Nicaraguan 4 × 400 metres relay team. Her first came at the 1990 Games in Tegucigalpa, where she won bronze leading off the team.

She competed in her first global championship at the 1993 World Championships in Athletics, qualifying in the 1500 m and 300 m. In the 1500 m, she finished 12th in her heat in 4:56.22, while in the 3000 m she finished 15th in her qualifier in 10:48.08. Portobanco also set the Nicaraguan 10,000 m record of 40:13.20 in 1993, which still stood as of 2014.

Portobanco won her second medal at the 1994 Central American Games. She led off the Nicaraguan silver medal-winning 4 × 400 m team, finishing behind El Salvador.

She competed in the 1500 m and 5000 m at the 1995 Summer Universiade in Fukuoka, Japan. Portobanco finished 11th in her 1500 m heat but finished 18th in the 5000 m finals, setting a personal best of 18:28.31 minutes.

At the 1996 Olympics, Portobanco was seeded in the 3rd 5000 m heat. She placed 15th, failing to advance. Her time of 18:42.78 was noted to have failed to improve upon her personal best.

Portobanco also competed at the 1997 World Championships in Athletics in the 5000 m. She finished 21st in her heat with a 19:08.44 minute time.

== Personal life ==
Portobanco attended the National University of Engineering in Nicaragua.

In 2019, Portobanco received a plaque of recognition from her alma mater. She was called in Spanish an illustrious figure that raised the university's profile.
