= Operación Galgo =

Spanish athletics doping investigation

Operación Galgo (Operation Greyhound) is an investigation into doping in athletics by the Guardia Civil in Spain. Initiated in April 2010, the investigation came to public attention with the raid of houses and the arrest of high-profile athletes, coaches and doctors, among others.

Among those arrested were Marta Domínguez, the reigning steeplechase world champion. She was immediately suspended from her role of vice president of the Real Federación Española de Atletismo (Spain's governing body for athletics). Other athletes who were interrogated were European champion Nuria Fernández, Alberto García, Reyes Estévez and Adriënne Herzog. European cross country champion Alemayehu Bezabeh admitted to taking banned substances. The case centres on athletics coaches César Pérez, Manuel Pascua and María José Martínez Guerrero, manager José Alonso and Doctor Eufemiano Fuentes, who was previously implicated in the Operación Puerto doping case.

Sixty-one Spanish athletes signed a petition in support of the investigation.

In March 2011, Bezabeh was absolved of doping charges by the Spanish Athletics Federation due to a lack of evidence against him, and the organisation's president accepted that Bezabeh's blood had been drawn to test for a liver condition.

In July 2011, Marta Dominguez was acquitted of the charges of doping (providing various medicines without proper prescription) pending with the courts.

== Gallery ==
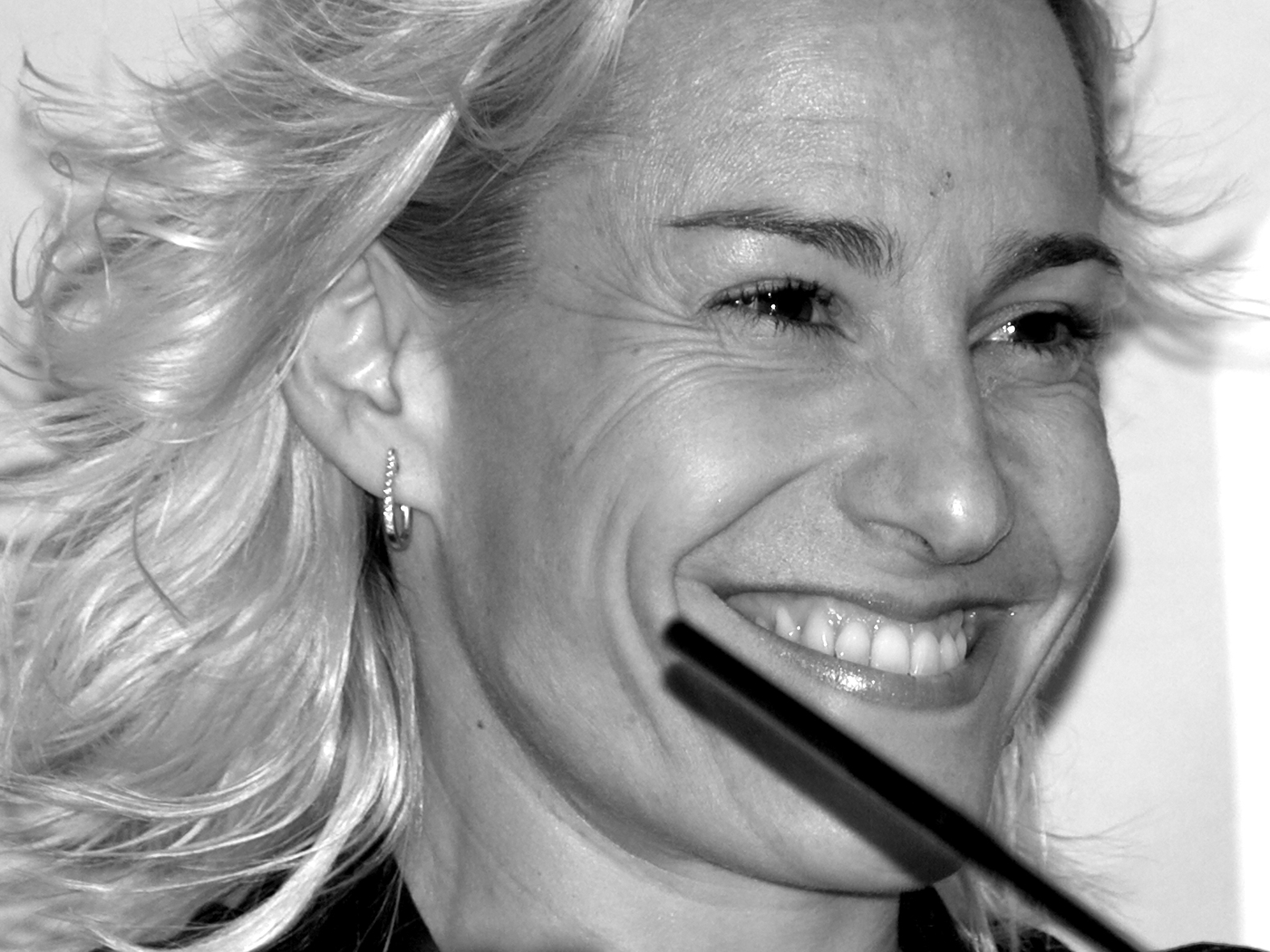
Marta Dominguez, acquitted in July 2011

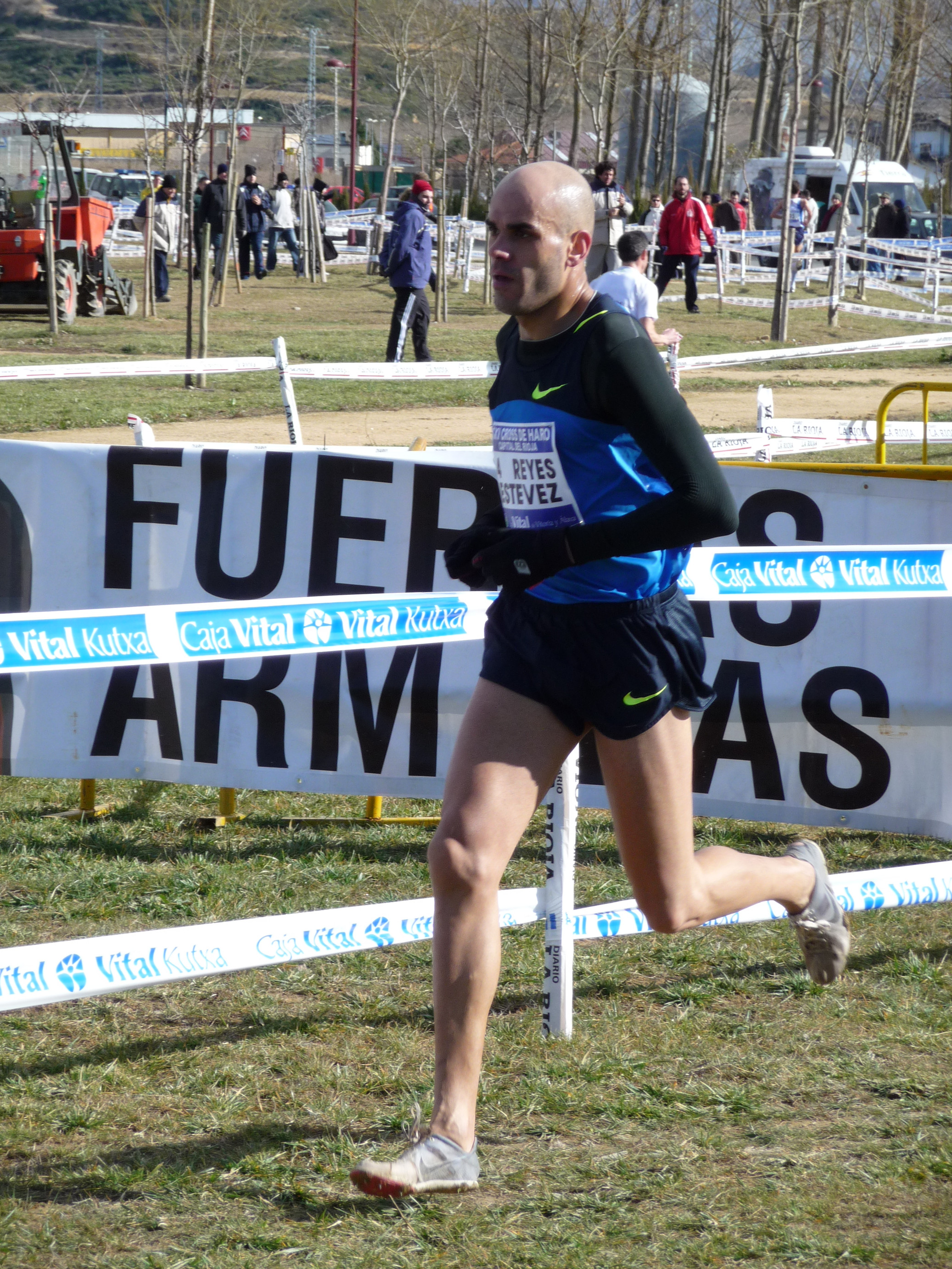
Reyes Estévez

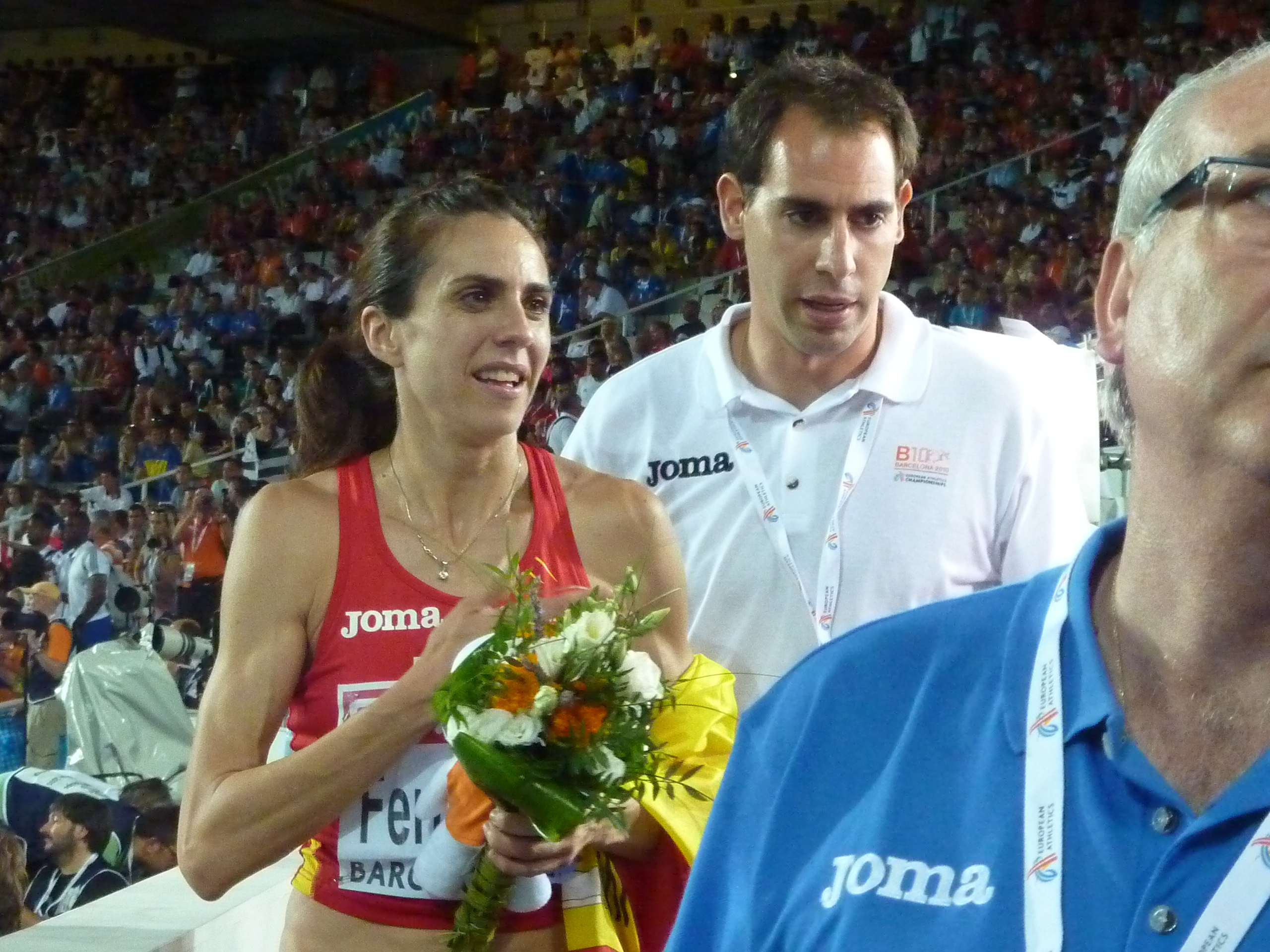
Nuria Fernández

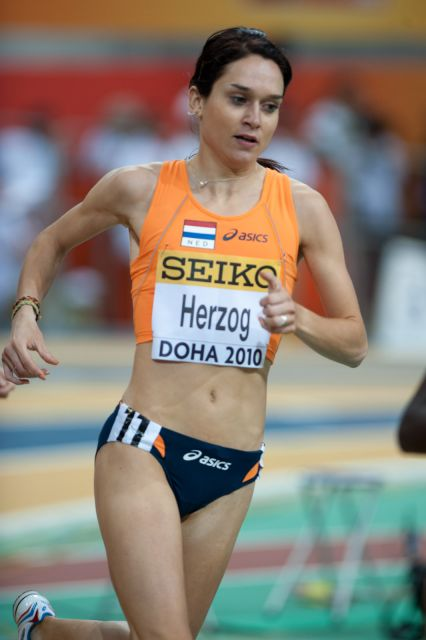
Adriënne Herzog, acquitted in August 2011

== See also ==
- List of doping cases in sport
