= Paige Siemers =

American long-distance runner

Paige Siemers (née Higgins; born July 12, 1982) is an American long-distance track runner.

In college, Siemers was a three time All-Big 12 runner for the University of Kansas.

Siemers has two top eight finishes at the Chicago Marathon, was the top American at the 2010 Boston Marathon, and has won the 2006 Walt Disney World Marathon. She has also competed at the Houston Marathon and the Los Angeles Marathon.

In 2007, Siemers beat 3,000 other female runners to win the Garry Bjorklund Half Marathon in Duluth, Minnesota, with a time of 1:14:47.

Siemers competed at the 2009 World Championships in Athletics where she finished 29th in the women's marathon.

Siemers has qualified for the US Olympic Trials in the marathon for the 2016 Olympics due to her finish at the 2013 California International Marathon.
