= Angela Brito =

Ecuadorian long-distance runner (born 1985)

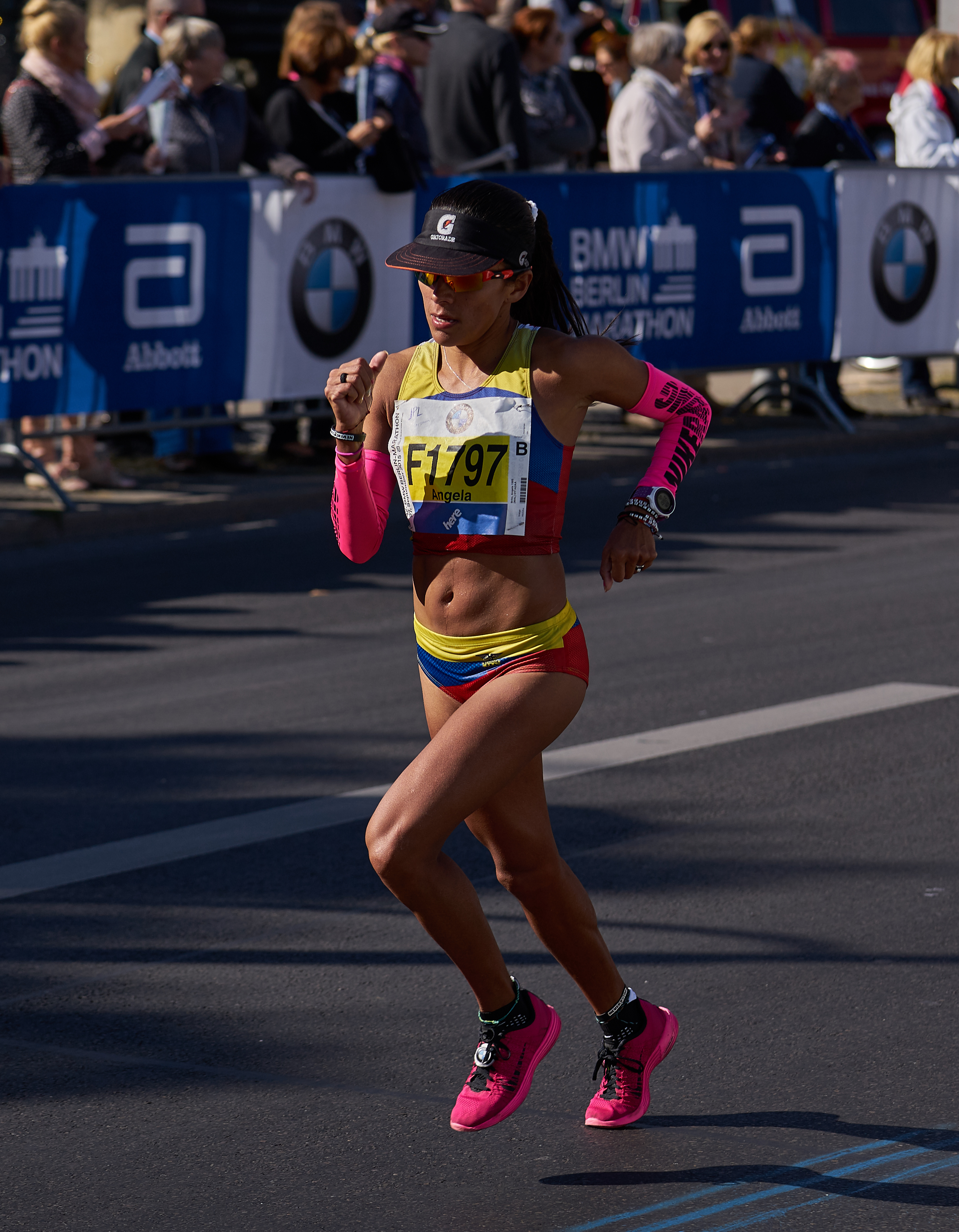
- Brito at the 2015 Berlin Marathon

Personal information
- Nationality: Ecuadorian
- Born: 5 April 1985 (age 41)

Sport
- Sport: Long-distance running
- Event: Marathon

Angela Brito (born 5 April 1985) is an Ecuadorian long-distance runner. She competed in the women's marathon at the 2017 World Championships in Athletics in London. Brito's PR in the event is 2:42:18, set at the Hamburg Marathon in Germany. In January 2014 she was victorious in the Walt Disney World Marathon in Bay Lake, Florida with a winning time of 2:47:44.
