= Disney Princess Half Marathon =

Annual half marathon in Florida

- Location: Walt Disney World
- Event type: Road
- Distance: Half Marathon
- Primary sponsor: Corkcicle
- Established: 2009 (17 years ago)
- Website: Official website
- Participants: 20,000

The Disney Princess Half Marathon is an annual half marathon held every February in Orlando, Florida by runDisney (a division of Disney Sports Enterprises). The race has been held since 2009.

It is part of a weekend race series that also includes a 5K and a 10K, as well as the "Fairytale Challenge," which includes running both the half marathon and the 10k.

== History ==
The first half marathon, run in February 2009, featured 11,000 runners.

The 2021 in-person edition of the race was cancelled due to the coronavirus pandemic, with all registrants given the option of running the race virtually or obtaining a full refund (as long as they had a valid shipping address in the United States).

The medals change each year and are themed after different princesses. In 2024, the themes were: 5k - Ariel, 10k - Rapunzel, Half Marathon - Tiana, and Fairytale Challenge - Anna and Elsa.

The races in the Disney Princess Marathon Weekend usually sell out within a few minutes of registration opening.

== Participants ==
Women generally make up about 91%-95% of the runners in the Princess Half Marathon, and for those women, on average, over 50% of them are running their first half marathon.

There have been three instances in which a woman has been the overall winner of the half-marathon, including at the 15th anniversary when Neely Gracey won against the first place male winner.

Matt James, the first Black man to be Bachelor, finished in the top ten in 2024. In 2025, that year's reigning Miss USA ran the half marathon.

Several participants run the race to raise money for various charities including Children's Miracle Network Hospitals, the American Cancer Society, and the National Multiple Sclerosis Society.

== Course ==
Participants run through Disney theme parks before they open to the public. Additionally, Disney has music and other entertainment along the race course, including photo ops with Disney characters. The course runs through Walt Disney World Resort, from Epcot to the Magic Kingdom and back.

== "Fairytale Challenge" ==
The Fairytale Challenge is a way for runners to earn an extra medal for doing the 10k on Saturday of the weekend and the half marathon on the Sunday. People can also add an optional 5k on Friday, and take part in optional yoga on Monday morning after the half marathon.

== Winners ==
Year	Men's winner	City	Time	Women's winner	City	Time	Rf.
2025	Jorge Crz Orduna (USA)	Buda, TX	1:15:07	Lisa Hart (USA)	Winter Garden, FL	1:19:21	
2024	Michael Fussner (USA)	Saint Louis, MO	1:15:11	Shea Zablan (USA)	Birmingham, AL	1:28:18	
2023	Michael Fussner (USA)	Saint Louis, MO	1:16:02	Neely Gracey (USA)	Lafeyette, CO	1:15:55	
2022	Brett Milden (USA)	Mullica, Hill, NJ	1:17:06	Georganne Watson (USA)	Lititz, PA	1:20:34	
2021	Virtual race only due to coronavirus pandemic						
2020	Momo Picciotto (USA)	Brooklyn, NY	1:13:59	Kelly Wehman (USA)	Ringgold, GA	1:24:26	
2019	Zackary Truitt (USA)	Tyrone, GA	1:20:28	Jackie Pirtlehall (USA)	Saint Charles, MO	1:18:30	
2018	Victor Da Costa Mendoza (USA)	Windermere, FL	1:09:03	Dani Cook (USA)	Fort Collins, CO	1:20:31	
2017	Jordan Desilets (USA)	Pinckney, MI	1:11:15	Kaitlyn Johnson (USA)	Westfield, NJ	1:22:16	
