= Athletics at the 1999 Summer Universiade – Women's half marathon =

The women's half marathon event at the 1999 Summer Universiade was held on 11 July in Palma de Mallorca, Spain.

== Results ==
Rank	Athlete	Nationality	Time	Notes
1st place, gold medalist(s)	Rosaria Console	Italy	1:14:14	
2nd place, silver medalist(s)	Yukiko Akaba	Japan	1:14:35	
3rd place, bronze medalist(s)	Marta Fernández	Spain	1:14:52	SB
4	Yumiko Okamoto	Japan	1:15:07	
5	Kim Pawelek	United States	1:15:47	
6	Elizabeth Mongudhi	Namibia	1:16:02	
7	Charné Rademeyer	South Africa	1:16:23	
8	Anke Laws	Germany	1:16:51	
9	Yun Sun-suk	South Korea	1:17:05	
10	Mai Tagami	Japan	1:18:08	
11	Nasria Azaïdj	Algeria	1:18:27	
12	Maribella Aparicio	United States	1:20:27	
13	Naima Bara	Morocco	1:21:20	PB
14	Zena Wilsnach	South Africa	1:22:59	
15	Hulda Nwokocha	Nigeria	1:24:38	
16	Daphne Farrugia	Malta	1:31:26	
	Annemette Jensen	Denmark	DNF	
	Najat Karzaz	Morocco	DNS	
