= Kim Pawelek Brantly =

Personal information
- Born: January 20, 1974 (age 52) Ho Chi Minh City, Vietnam

Sport
- Sport: Marathon running

Kim Pawelek Brantly (born January 20, 1974) is a Vietnamese-American middle- and long-distance runner. She is the woman's 1999 US Marathon Champion.

== Early life ==
When Kim Pawelek Brantly was one year old, her family boarded a plane at the Saigon airport to escape the troubles of the Vietnam War. Shortly after their takeoff, further evacuation came to a halt due to the Bombing of Tan Son Nhut Air Base. After arriving in the United States, Pawelek's family began a new life in Baltimore, then moved to Thorp, Wisconsin, where Pawelek's mother attended elementary school with her daughters. Later, the family moved to Port Charlotte, Florida, when Pawelek was a preteen. When she was 14, Pawelek's father Alan and mother Linda Nguyen separated. Eventually, Nguyen wanted to move Pawelek and her sister Mary to Texas, but Pawelek refused. Despite initial disagreement, Nguyen decided to allow Pawelek to remain in Florida. Pawelek attended high school and college in Florida, where her running career began.

== Running career ==
Kim Pawelek Brantly began running long distance during her senior year at Port Charlotte High School. The very first time Pawelek raced, she came in last. Originally a sprint runner, Pawelek began long distance running to train for soccer. As a senior at the University of North Florida, Pawelek won NCAA Division II titles in the 5K run and 10K run. Pawelek went on after college to continue training for and running marathons, with many wins and finishes within the top 10 racers. Pawelek's most notable success was her 1999 Twin Cities Marathon win, which was the woman's 1999 USA Marathon Championships. The fast competition pushed her to her fastest marathon time of 2:37:56. As Pawelek continued to train for marathons, she also had her sights set on trying for the Olympics. Pawelek participated in the 2000 Trials, and finished in 7th place, netting her $13,000 in prize money.

== Personal life ==
Pawelek is married to Keith Brantly, a former professional long-distance runner.

== Achievements ==
Year	Competition	Venue	Position	Event	Notes
1999	Summer Universiade Half Marathon	Palma de Mallorca, Spain	5th	Half marathon	1:15:47
1999	Twin Cities Marathon	Minneapolis–Saint Paul	1st	Marathon	2:37:56
2000	US Olympic Marathon Trials	Columbia, South Carolina	7th	Marathon	2:39:16
2000	Walt Disney World Half Marathon	Orlando, Florida	1st	Half-marathon	1:15:19
2001	Walt Disney World Half Marathon	Orlando, Florida	1st	Half marathon	1:16:46
2002	IAAF World Half Marathon Championship	Brussels, Belgium	54th	Half marathon	1:17:30
2004	Walt Disney World Half Marathon	Orlando, Florida	1st	Half marathon	1:18:12
2004	Jacksonville Half Marathon	Jacksonville, Florida	1st	Half marathon	1:22:59
2006	Jacksonville Marathon	Jacksonville, Florida	1st	Marathon	2:56:04
2008	Walt Disney World Half Marathon	Orlando, Florida	1st	Half marathon	1:18:07
2006	Jacksonville Marathon	Jacksonville, Florida	1st	Marathon	2:41:30
