= Athletics at the 1995 Summer Universiade – Women's 5000 metres =

The women's 5000 metres event at the 1995 Summer Universiade was held on 29 August at the Hakatanomori Athletic Stadium in Fukuoka, Japan. It was the first time that this event was contested at the Universiade, replacing the 3000 metres.

== Results ==
Rank	Athlete	Nationality	Time	Notes
1st place, gold medalist(s)	Gabriela Szabo	Romania	15:29.86	CR
2nd place, silver medalist(s)	Silvia Sommaggio	Italy	15:34.32	
3rd place, bronze medalist(s)	Yumi Sato	Japan	15:35.28	
4	Adriana Fernández	Mexico	15:46.45	
5	Milka Mihaylova	Bulgaria	15:56.14	
6	Yasuko Kimura	Japan	15:59.49	
7	Lidiya Vasilevskaya	Russia	16:03.65	
8	Beatriz Santiago	Spain	16:03.90	
9	Louise Watson	Great Britain	16:07.09	
10	Hrisostomia Iakovou	Greece	16:14.80	
11	Grete Koens	Netherlands	16:23.65	
12	Katherine Fonshell	United States	16:24.16	
13	Denisa Costescu	Romania	16:25.06	
14	Elizabeth Mongudhi	Namibia	16:34.26	
15	Elva Martinez-Dryer	United States	16:38.54	
16	Karen Harvey	Canada	17:08.35	
17	Doaa Sleman	Israel	17:21.07	
18	Martha Portobanco	Nicaragua	18:28.31	
19	Sarah Kekana	South Africa	18:48.67	
20	Cheong Tsui Ying	Singapore	18:54.37	
	Shuree Bekhkhuyag	Mongolia	DNS	
