= Diana Martín =

Spanish athlete (born 1981)

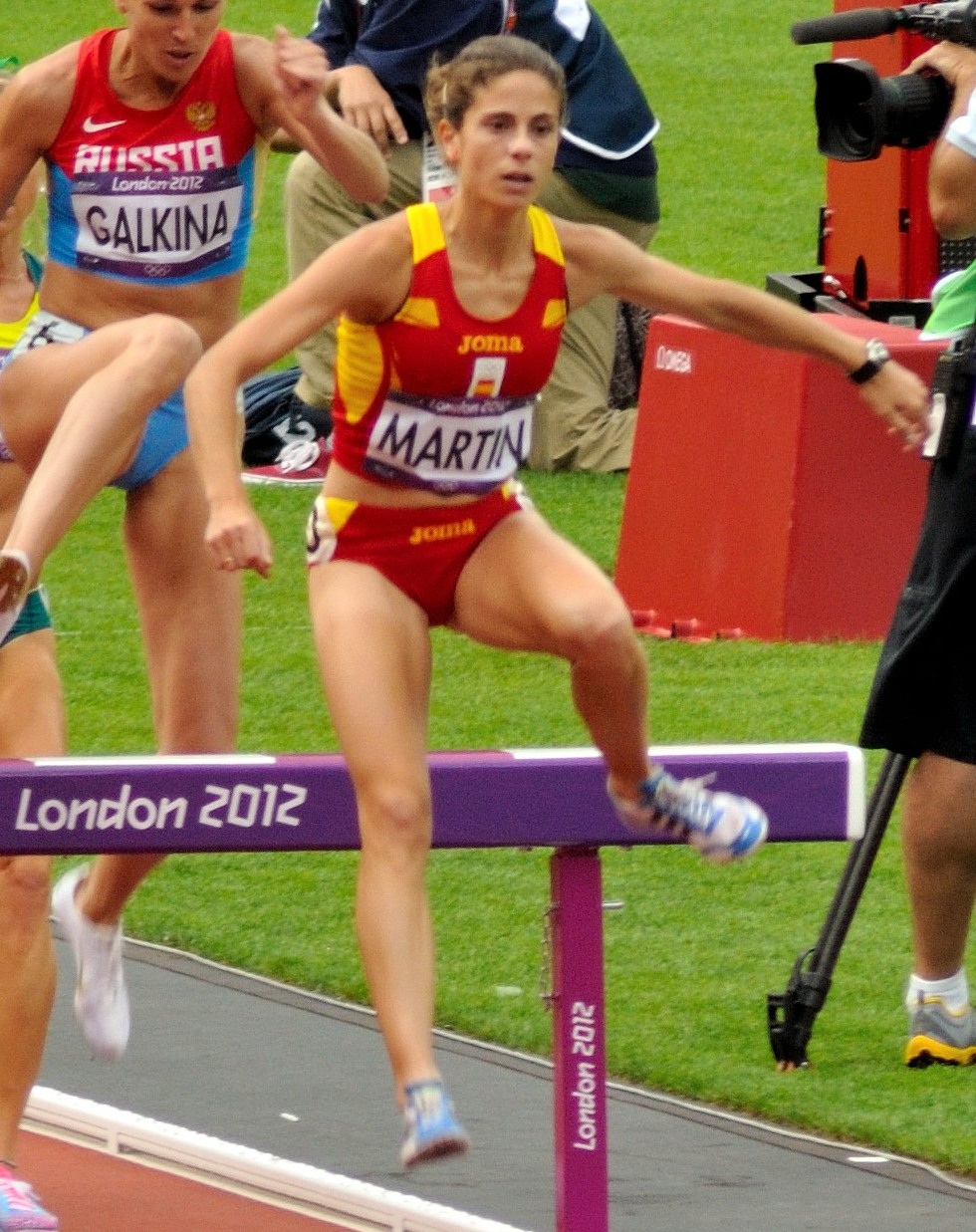

Personal information
- Born: April 1, 1981 (age 45)
- Height: 1.63 m (5 ft 4 in)
- Weight: 50 kg (110 lb)

Sport
- Country: Spain
- Sport: Track and field
- Event: 3000m steeplechase
Medal record
European Championships
Bronze medal – third place	2014 Zürich	3000 m steeplechase

Diana Martín (born 1 April 1981 in Madrid) is a Spanish athlete. She competed in the 3000 metres steeplechase at the 2012 Summer Olympics, placing 21st with a time of 9:35.77, a personal best. She competed at the 2016 Summer Olympics.

== Competition record ==
Year	Competition	Venue	Position	Event	Notes
Representing Spain
2003	European U23 Championships	Bydgoszcz, Poland	17th	3000m steeplechase	10:51.20
2006	European Championships	Gothenburg, Sweden	14th (h)	3000 m s'chase	9:47.52
2007	Universiade	Bangkok, Thailand	6th	3000 m s'chase	10:05.22
2007	World Championships	Osaka, Japan	24th (h)	3000 m s'chase	9:53.88
2009	World Championships	Berlin, Germany	26th (h)	3000 m s'chase	9:42.39
2010	Ibero-American Championships	San Fernando, Spain	3rd	3000 m	9:06.53
2011	World Championships	Daegu, South Korea	24th (h)	3000 m s'chase	10:04.59
2012	European Championships	Helsinki, Finland	8th	3000 m s'chase	9:45.36
2012	Olympic Games	London, United Kingdom	21st (h)	3000 m s'chase	9:35.77
2013	World Championships	Moscow, Russia	11th	3000 m s'chase	9:49.03
2014	European Championships	Zürich, Switzerland	3rd	3000 m s'chase	9:30.70
2016	European Championships	Amsterdam, Netherlands	8th	3000 m s'chase	9:43.65
2016	Olympic Games	Rio de Janeiro, Brazil	31st (h)	3000 m s'chase	9:44.07
