= Yelena Sidorchenkova Orlova =

Russian long-distance runner

Yelena Sidorchenkova Orlova (born 30 May 1980) is a Russian long-distance runner who specializes in the 3000 metres steeplechase.

She finished sixth in 3000 m steeplechase at the 2006 European Athletics Championships and eleventh in 3000 metres at the 2008 World Indoor Championships.

On 12 February 2012, running under the name of Yelena Orlova, she claimed the World Record in the rarely run and non-standard, indoor 2000 metres steeplechase, running 6:06.11 at the Moscow City Championships.

== Competition record ==
Year	Competition	Venue	Position	Event	Notes
Representing Russia
2003	World Indoor Championships	Birmingham, United Kingdom	17th (h)	3000 m	9:13.51
2006	European Championships	Gothenburg, Sweden	6th	3000 m s'chase	9:38.05
2008	World Indoor Championships	Valencia, Spain	11th (h)	3000 m	9:01.81
2009	World Championships	Berlin, Germany	22nd (h)	3000 m s'chase	9:37.16
2012	Olympic Games	London, United Kingdom	18th (h)	3000 m s'chase	9:33.14

== Personal bests ==
- 800 metres - 2:03.10 min (2008)
- 1500 metres - 4:05.77 min (2008), indoor - 4:06.04 min (2008)
- 3000 metres - 8:56.29 min (2008), indoor - 8:43.88 min (2006)
- 3000 metres steeplechase - 9:22.15 min (2009)
- 5000 metres - 15:03.88 min (2008)
