= Leonid Shvetsov =

Russian long-distance runner

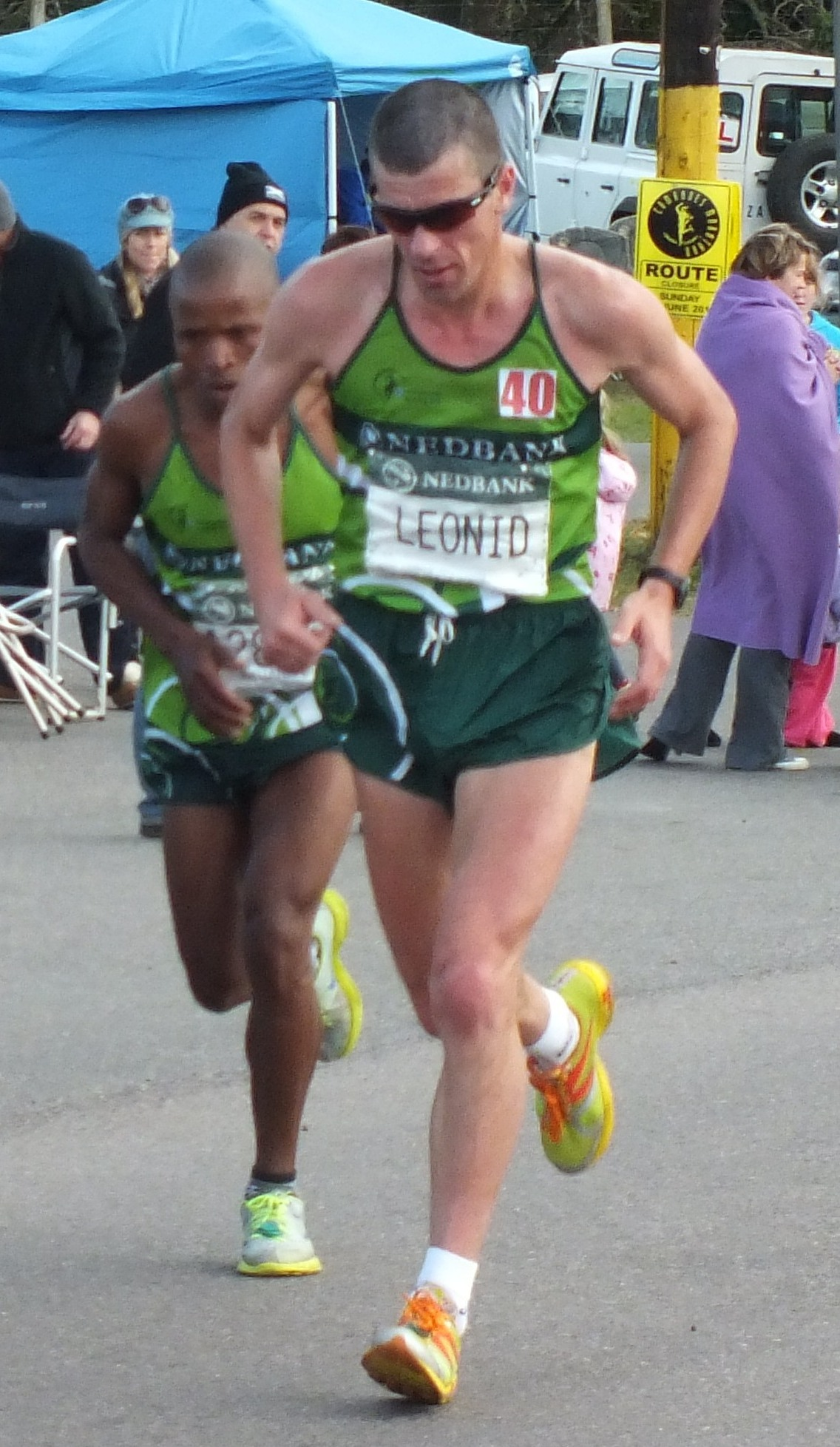
- Leonid Shvetsov in 2012.

Personal information
- Nationality: Russian
- Born: 28 March 1969 (age 57)

Sport
- Sport: Long-distance running
- Event: Marathon

Leonid Shvetsov (born 28 March 1969) is a Russian long-distance runner. He competed in the men's marathon at the 1996 Summer Olympics and the 2004 Summer Olympics.

Shvetsov held the record for the Comrades Marathon up run until it was broken in 2026. He set the record in 2008 with a winning time of 5:24:49. Shvetsov has also held the record for the fastest time at Walt Disney World Marathon since 1995, at 2:11:50.
