= Walt Disney World Marathon =

Annual race in the United States

- Location: Walt Disney World
- Event type: Road
- Distance: Marathon
- Primary sponsor: Cigna
- Established: 1994 (32 years ago)
- Website: Official website
- Participants: 14,116 finishers (2020)

The Walt Disney World Marathon is an annual marathon held every January in Bay Lake, Florida by runDisney (a division of Disney Sports Enterprises). The race has been held since 1994.

The marathon is one of the ten largest marathons in the United States, with over 10,000 finishers. It is part of a weekend race series that also includes a 5K, a 10K, and a half marathon, as well as a number of challenges involving one or more of these races.

== History ==
The first marathon, run in January 1994, featured 5,588 runners. This marathon was the first race that launched the Disney Endurance Series, which is now runDisney.

In 1995, the men's current race record was set by Leonid Shvetsov, of Russia, at 2:11:50. While in 1996, electronic timing was first used to produce race results.

With the 1998 fifth anniversary of the WDW Marathon having a theme of "Herculean Entertainment", the inaugural Donald Half Marathon is held on the same day until 2005. A corporate relay option was also added to the marathon.

In 2003, the first local resident, Bea Marie Alitieri of Clermont, won the 10th anniversary of the WDW Marathon women's division at a pace of 2:53:10. Brazilian Adriano Bastos began his eight-year streak of consecutive marathon wins in 2003. The 10th anniversary also saw the debut of the "perfect" program, which included 152 runners who had completed all ten Marathons between 1994 and 2003.

In 2006, the first Goofy Race and Half Challenge is first given with the full and half marathons were first ran on separate days, Saturday and Sunday.

The 2010 races set two records with the largest participant field (55,000) and the coldest starting temperatures (low 30s). Also in 2010, the first Pre-race Pasta Party and a Post Race Celebration were held at Epcot.

In 2011 the racers were allowed to vote for the medal design and it was the year of "Marathon Monday". Bastos' winning streak was broken by fellow Brazilian Fredison Costa. The 2012 year was the 15th anniversary of the Donald Half Marathon which saw the only running of the Walt Disney World Chip and Dale Marathon Relay.

The 20th Anniversary of the Walt Disney World Marathon was held in 2013, as 95 marathon runners who ran all 20 marathons were recognized. 2013 was the first year where men were outnumbered by the women (57%).

The 2014 World Marathon Weekend added the Walt Disney World 10K plus the Dopey Challenge for completing all four weekend races. RunDisney reduced the number of registration allowed for the races and add more race corrals and gender-specific sizing for participant shirts.

A new medal was introduced for the Goofy Challenge for its 10th anniversary in 2015. The Castaway Cay Challenge race was inaugurated in 2015, with those that ran a Walt Disney World Marathon Weekend 5K plus distance race and booked the next cruise on Disney Dream. 700 racers participated in this 5K race on the Disney Cruise Line's private island, Castaway Cay.

In 2017, the Goofy Challenge, Dopey Challenge, and half marathon were not held because of anticipated lightning and a lack of necessary shelter on course should it be required during the race. All registered half marathon runners received their half marathon medals.

The Marathon celebrated its 25th anniversary in January 2018, at which time the field of 26,000 participants included the remaining 76 "perfect" runners who had completed all 25 Marathons between 1994 and 2018. 75-year-old Gretna, Louisiana native Rudy Smith was the oldest of those "perfect" participants, completing his 57th career marathon in a time of 5:01:03. That year, Lock Haven University alum Nicholas Hilton broke the 13-year streak of Brazilian victors (compiled by Adriano Bastos and Fredison Costa) to become just the second American male to win the Marathon.

Hilton won again in 2020, becoming the first American male to win the race twice. Temperatures during the event reached a record high of 84 degrees, prompting event coordinators to shorten the course by two miles and send out a text message to participants: "Given today's rising temperatures and the length of the race, for our runners' safety, we are modifying the remainder of the event." The message was further clarified on Twitter: "Even with the modified course – run times will still be recorded and runners will receive medals at the finish line."

The 2021 in-person edition of the race was cancelled due to the coronavirus pandemic, with all registrants given the option of running the race virtually or obtaining a full refund. (Note: The option to run the race virtually was only available for registrants with a valid shipping address in the United States.)

In 2022, Brittany Charboneau became the first woman to win all four races and the Dopey Challenge.

== Course ==
Disney's Blizzard Beach Water Park was added to the marathon route in 1995. The course was again redesigned in 1999 to included the newly opened Disney’s Animal Kingdom theme park. The course was changed again in 2013, adding a lap around the Walt Disney World Speedway plus some distance in the ESPN Wide World of Sports. In 2020, the course was amended to remove the Wide World of Sports segment that many runners had come to call "The Rat Maze" and replace it with a segment passing through the eastern portion of Blizzard Beach.

== Challenges ==
Goofy's Race and a Half Challenge, introduced in 2006, involves completing both the Half Marathon on Saturday and the full Marathon on Sunday for a combined 39.3 miles over two days.

The Dopey Challenge, introduced in 2014 along with the Disney World 10K, involves completing all four races – the Walt Disney World 5K on Thursday, the Walt Disney World 10K on Friday, the Walt Disney World Half Marathon on Saturday, and the Walt Disney World Marathon on Sunday – for a combined 48.6 miles over four days. In additional to the four individual race medals, runners who complete the Dopey Challenge are awarded both the Goofy's Race and a Half Challenge and Dopey Challenge medals.

The Castaway Cay Challenge, introduced in 2015, involves completing any Marathon Weekend race before boarding the Disney Dream at Port Canaveral the following Monday and sailing to Castaway Cay –Disney Cruise Line's private island in the Bahamas– to complete a 5K race across the island.

== Winners ==
Brazilian Adriano Bastos holds the record of most WDW Marathon wins at eight, while Brazilian Giovanna Martins holds the women's record at four.

Key: Course record

=== Marathon ===
Ed.	Date	Men's winner	Time	Women's winner	Time	Rf.
33	January 11, 2026	Matt Hensley (USA)	2:29:37	Brittany Charboneau (USA)	2:54:48	
32	January 12, 2025	Vanilson Neves (BRA)	2:27:17	Marielle Despres (USA)	3:02:09	
31	January 7, 2024	Vanilson Neves (BRA)	2:26:51	Stephanie Muscat (USA)	2:48:08	
30	January 8, 2023	Daniel Dos Santos (BRA)	2:26:51	Katherine Cargiulo (USA)	3:00:13	
29	January 9, 2022	Vanilson Neves (BRA)	2:30:37	Brittany Charboneau (USA)	2:45:15	
	2021	Virtual race only due to coronavirus pandemic				
27	January 12, 2020	Nicholas Hilton (USA)	2:22:19	Giovanna Martins (BRA)	2:54:19	
26	January 13, 2019	Fredison Costa (BRA)	2:18:45	Giovanna Martins (BRA)	2:45:24	
25	January 7, 2018	Nicholas Hilton (USA)	2:17:52	Giovanna Martins (BRA)	2:47:22	
24	January 8, 2017	Fredison Costa (BRA)	2:23:15	Giovanna Martins (BRA)	2:48:05	
23	January 10, 2016	Fredison Costa (BRA)	2:33:22	Natasha Yaremczuk (CAN)	2:52:21	
22	January 11, 2015	Fredison Costa (BRA)	2:18:06	Giovanna Martins (BRA)	2:50:20	
21	January 12, 2014	Fredison Costa (BRA)	2:21:39	Angela Brito (ECU)	2:47:44	
20	January 13, 2013	Adriano Bastos (BRA)	2:21:16	Renee High (USA)	2:48:30	
19	January 8, 2012	Fredison Costa (BRA)	2:19:01	Renee High (USA)	2:48:33	
18	January 9, 2011	Fredison Costa (BRA)	2:21:15	Leah Thorvilson (USA)	2:42:11	
17	January 10, 2010	Adriano Bastos (BRA)	2:22:08	Lisa Mizutani (JPN)	2:51:20	
16	January 11, 2009	Adriano Bastos (BRA)	2:20:38	Lisa Mizutani (JPN)	2:46:27	
15	January 13, 2008	Adriano Bastos (BRA)	2:20:58	Melanie Peters (USA)	2:47:32	
14	January 7, 2007	Adriano Bastos (BRA)	2:19:24	Gabriela Trana (CRC)	2:57:04	
13	January 8, 2006	Adriano Bastos (BRA)	2:19:44	Paige Higgins (USA)	2:51:38	
12	January 9, 2005	Adriano Bastos (BRA)	2:19:16	Amy Shertzer (USA)	2:56:06	
11	January 11, 2004	Matthew Dobson (USA)	2:27:58	Kim Donaldson (USA)	2:59:13	
10	January 12, 2003	Adriano Bastos (BRA)	2:18:33	Bea Marie Altieri (USA)	2:53:10	
9	January 6, 2002	Dai Roberts (GBR)	2:32:38	Ilda Santos (BRA)	2:48:38	
8	January 7, 2001	Chris Teague (GBR)	2:26:38	Ilda Santos (BRA)	2:46:40	
7	January 9, 2000	Jose Silva (BRA)	2:25:40	Jennifer Uwins (USA)	2:54:51	
6	January 10, 1999	Santiago de Araujo (BRA)	2:24:28	Marina Jones (USA)	2:54:19	
5	January 11, 1998	Santiago de Araujo (BRA)	2:23:25	Lyubov Klochko (UKR)	2:44:47	
4	January 5, 1997	Dick Hooper (IRE)	2:31:19	Larisa Zyuzko (RUS)	2:41:13	
3	January 7, 1996	Miguel Upegui (COL)	2:23:26	Lyubov Klochko (UKR)	2:45:12	
2	January 8, 1995	Leonid Shvetsov (RUS)	2:11:50	Judit Nagy (HUN)	2:31:54	
1	January 16, 1994	Leonid Shvetsov (RUS)	2:14:27	Judit Nagy (HUN)	2:32:32	

=== Half Marathon ===
Year	Men's winner	Time	Women's winner	Time	Rf.
2025	Caleb Belmont (USA)	1:15:18	Kelsi Chappell (USA)	1:21:49	
2024	Nolan McKenna (USA)	37:28	Haley Chura (USA)	43:00	
2023	Michael Meehan (USA)	1:11:38	Peighton Meske (USA)	1:16:06	
2022	Brock Kelly (USA)	1:12:48	Brittany Charboneau (USA)	1:19:18	
2021	Virtual race only due to coronavirus pandemic				
2020	Daniel dos Santos (BRA)	1:10:18	Laura Paulsen (USA)	1:20:30	
2019	Joao Marcelo Avelar (BRA)	1:08:54	Tina Muir (USA)	1:19:45	
2018	Joao Marcelo Avelar (BRA)	1:08:28	Brittany Charboneau (USA)	1:17:37	
2017	cancelled due to risk of lightning				
2016	Joao Marcelo Avelar (BRA)	1:10:17	Megan Curham (USA)	1:14:29	
2015	Luke Humphrey (USA)	1:08:56	Megan Goethals (USA)	1:16:25	
2014	Mike Morgan (USA)	1:09:39	Laurie Knowles (USA)	1:17:59	
2013	Mike Morgan (USA)	1:05:26	Melissa White (USA)	1:14:56	
2012	Jose de Morais (BRA)	1:10:12	Rosa Chacha (ECU)	1:16:43	
2011	Tim Young (USA)	1:05:35	Jenny Scherer (USA)	1:17:35	
2010	Chad Johnson (USA)	1:07:02	Emily Mortensen (USA)	1:17:32	
2009	David Jankowski (USA)	1:07:36	Elizabeth Chelegat (KEN)	1:17:32	
2008	Chad Johnson (USA)	1:06:53	Kim Pawelek (USA)	1:18:07	
2007	Jarrod Shoemaker (USA)	1:10:29	Melissa White (USA)	1:15:43	
2006	Josh Eberly (USA)	1:08:12	Melissa White (USA)	1:18:34	
2005	Michael McGrane (USA)	1:13:08	Sabrina Monro (USA)	1:19:24	
2004	Clint Verran (USA)	1:05:43	Kim Pawelek (USA)	1:18:12	
2003	Ronnie Holassie (TRI)	1:07:45	Julie Peterson (USA)	1:21:05	
2002	Gabriel Rodríguez (USA)	1:09:07	Monica Hostetler (USA)	1:17:34	
2001	Ronnie Holassie (TRI)	1:09:49	Kim Pawelek (USA)	1:16:46	
2000	Keith Brantly (USA)	1:09:46	Kim Pawelek (USA)	1:15:19	
1999	Per Kristian Moerk (NOR)	1:11:11	Taeko Terauchi (JPN)	1:13:04	
1998	Keith Brantly (USA)	1:09:58	Joan Samuelson (USA)	1:18:37	

== See also ==
- List of marathon races in North America
