= Athletics at the 1997 Summer Universiade – Women's half marathon =

The women's half marathon event at the 1997 Summer Universiade was held on the streets of Catania, Italy on 31 August. This was the first time that this event was featured at the Universiade replacing the marathon.

== Results ==
Rank	Athlete	Nationality	Time	Notes
1st place, gold medalist(s)	Mari Sotani	Japan	1:11:49	UR
2nd place, silver medalist(s)	Agata Balsamo	Italy	1:13:06	
3rd place, bronze medalist(s)	Miyuki Tokura	Japan	1:13:20	
4	Lourdes López	Mexico	1:13:44	
5	Katrina Price Hamilton	United States	1:15:44	
6	Kae Ito	Japan	1:16:01	
7	Leone Justino da Silva	Brazil	1:20:11	
8	Nili Abramski	Israel	1:20:51	
9	Elizabeth Mongudhi	Namibia	1:21:40	
10	Kristin Cobb	United States	1:21:59	
12	Hamida Mazouzi	Algeria	1:25:15	
13	Radha Shrestha	Nepal	1:37:02	
