= Elizabeth Mongudhi =

Namibian long-distance runner

Personal information
- Nationality: Namibian/English
- Born: June 15, 1970 (age 56) Windhoek, South-West Africa
- Height: 1.59 m (5 ft 3 in)
- Weight: 48 kg (106 lb)

Sport
- Sport: Running
- Events: Marathon, half marathon
Medal record
Athletics
Representing Namibia
Commonwealth Games
Bronze medal – third place	1998 Kuala Lumpur	marathon

Elizabeth Mongudhi (born 15 June 1970 in Windhoek) is a female retired Namibian athlete competing in the long-distance events.

== Athletics career ==
She represented England in the 3,000 metres event, at the 1994 Commonwealth Games in Victoria, British Columbia, Canada.

She represented Namibia at the 1996 and 2000 Summer Olympics, as well as two World Championships. Her biggest success is the bronze medal in the marathon at the 1998 Commonwealth Games.

== Competition record ==
Year	Competition	Venue	Position	Event	Notes
Representing England
1994	Commonwealth Games	Victoria, Canada	13th	3000 m	9:38.95
Representing Namibia
1995	Universiade	Fukuoka, Japan	14th	5000 m	16:34.26
1996	Olympic Games	Atlanta, United States	59th	Marathon	2:56:19
1997	Universiade	Catania, Italy	9th	Half marathon	1:21:40
1998	Commonwealth Games	Kuala Lumpur, Malaysia	3rd	Marathon	2:43:28
1999	Universiade	Palma de Mallorca, Spain	6th	Half marathon	1:16:02
1999	World Championships	Seville, Spain	27th	Marathon	2:40:07
1999	All-Africa Games	Johannesburg, South Africa	4th	Marathon	2:52:59
2000	Olympic Games	Sydney, Australia	–	Marathon	DNF
2001	World Championships	Edmonton, Canada	36th	Marathon	2:42:23
2002	Commonwealth Games	Manchester, United Kingdom	10th	Marathon	2:49:19
