= Ulrika Flodin =

Swedish runner

Ulrika Johansson
Personal information
- Born: 9 February 1975 Alunda, Sweden

Sport
- Sport: Athletics
- Event: 3000 m steeplechase
- Club: Rånäs 4H

Kerstin Ulrika Flodin (née Johansson; born 9 February 1975) is a retired Swedish middle- and long-distance runner. She represented her country at the 2009 World Championships and 2010 World Indoor Championships.

== International competitions ==
Year	Competition	Venue	Position	Event	Notes
Representing Sweden
2009	European Indoor Championships	Turin, Italy	13th (h)	3000 m	4:17.65
2009	World Championships	Berlin, Germany	23rd (h)	3000 m s'chase	9:38.88
2010	World Indoor Championships	Doha, Qatar	16th (h)	1500 m	4:22.94
2010	European Championships	Barcelona, Spain	–	3000 m s'chase	DNF

== Personal bests ==
Outdoor

- 800 metres – 2:07.48 (Stockholm 2008)
- 1500 metres – 4:15.77 (Heusden-Zolder 2006)
- One mile – 4:49.51 (Enskede 2005)
- 3000 metres – 9:22.03 (Oslo 2010)
- 5000 metres – 16:17.49 (Malmö 2009)
- 3000 metres steeplechase – 9:38.88 (Berlin 2009)
- 10 kilometres – 36:43 (Stockholm 2015)

Indoor

- 800 metres – 2:09.77 (Sätra 2001)
- 1500 metres – 4:11.52 (Stockholm 2010)
- 3000 metres – 9:05.2 (Birmingham 2010)
