= RunDisney =

Disney endurance road race division

runDisney
- Formerly: Disney Endurance Series
- Type: Division of a whole owned subsidiary of a public conglomerate
- Industry: Sports
- Headquarters: ESPN Wide World of Sports Complex, Kissimmee, Florida, US
- Areas served: US, France
- Services: Road races
- Parent: Disney Sports Enterprises (Disney Parks, Experiences and Products)
- Website: rundisney.com

runDisney (stylized as runDisney, formerly Disney Endurance Series and The Endurance Series at Walt Disney World Resort) is the road race division of Disney Sports Enterprises, a unit of Disney Experiences, a segment and subsidiary of The Walt Disney Company. The division is designed to get runners to plan a "runcation", a vacation planned to coincide with the race they signed up for.

runDisney consists of 26 individual races with 163,000 runners.

== History ==
In 1994, Disney held the Walt Disney World Marathon, its first road race while adding addition races later. There were only 5,588 runners at this inaugural race of what became the Disney Endurance Series.

Disneyland Marathon and 5K were run in 1995 three weeks after the LA Marathon on March 26, 1995. The marathon included Anaheim Stadium and a loop around The Pond of Anaheim, while its 5K stuck to Disneyland taking in six of seven of the theme lands.

By 1998, Williams was named vice president of Disney Sports Attractions, overseeing a newly created sports & recreation division including its races. In 1998, the first Donald Half Marathon is run at the same day as the WDW Marathon. The first 10K Disney Classic race on October 3, 1999 kicked off Disney World's 15-month Millennium Celebration.

On March 30, 2003, Sports Attractions held the first Disney Inline Marathon at the request of the International Inline Skating Association. By 2005, a half marathon was added to this weekend.

In 2004, Florida Half-Ironman Triathlon and Family Festival was started by Ironman North America and Disney Sports Attraction and was scheduled only for two years. The festival was held May 22 to 23 which include the Florida Half-Ironman, a Kids Race, and an expo.

Disney's 10K Classic was renamed the Race for the Taste 10K in 2005 and moved to October 9 to coincide with the Epcot International Food and Wine Festival, which then ran from September 30 to November 13. The Race for the Cure 5K was scheduled for October 8 with proceeds benefiting the Susan G. Komen Breast Foundation while Disney's Cross Country Classic was scheduled on the seventh.

In 2006, the Goofy race challenge was inaugurated as the half and marathon were scheduled for separated days for the first time at the World Weekend. 3,000 runners applied for the challenge. By that year, a Fun Run 5K and Kids’ Races were added on Saturday, while a Health and Fitness Expo was held Thursday to Friday at Disney's Wide World of Sports Complex.

From May 5 to 7, 2006, the inaugural Disney Minnie Marathon Weekend was held but no race was a marathon. The Champion 5K and Fun Runs were added to the ESPN the Weekend at Disney's Hollywood Studios in 2009. The first Wine & Dine Half-Marathon was run in 2010.

The 2014 World Marathon Weekend added the Walt Disney World 10K plus the Dopey Challenge for completing all four weekend races. An additional race, Castaway Cay Challenge, was added to the weekend series in 2015 with the 5K race taking place on Disney Cruise Line's Castaway Cay. The first international runDisney weekend was Disneyland Paris Half Marathon in September 2016.

In September 2016 Disneyland Resort Paris held its first races at the DLP Val d’ Europe Half-Marathon.

RunDisney canceled all Disneyland Resort based races beginning in 2018 due to major ongoing construction projects (e.g. Star Wars: Galaxy's Edge, the Disneyland Eastern Gateway and a new Downtown Disney hotel). The Theme Park Insider blog speculated that Disney may be using the loss of revenue to the City of Anaheim and nearby business as leverage to expedite project approval.

In the 2017 Disney Wine & Dine Half Marathon, which took place on November 5, 2017, a runner collapsed and died near the finish line in the Epcot parking lot. No other details were initially disclosed.

In 2020, due to the ongoing COVID-19 pandemic, the Star Wars Rival Run Weekend was cancelled, while the Wine & Dine Half Marathon Weekend was changed to a virtual race weekend. On September 22, 2020, it was announced that both the 2021 Walt Disney World Marathon and the 2021 Princess Half Marathon Weekends would become virtual as well.

On June 30, 2021, it was announced that in-person racing would return to Walt Disney World, beginning with the Wine & Dine Weekend in November. Some modifications may be made due to COVID.

On September 11, 2022, during D23 Expo, it was revealed that runDisney races would return to Disneyland in 2024. On April 22, 2025, Disney announced that runDisney races would be paused immediately after Disneyland Half Marathon Weekend in 2026 to accommodate for upcoming construction.

== Weekend series ==
Weekend series	Month	Location	Inaugurated	Discontinued
Walt Disney World Marathon	January	Walt Disney World	1994	—N/a
Princess Half-Marathon	February	Walt Disney World	2009	—N/a
runDisney Springtime Surprise Weekend	April	Walt Disney World	2022	—N/a
Star Wars Half Marathon — The Dark Side	April	Walt Disney World	2016	2021
Walt Disney World Inline	March/April	Walt Disney World	2003	2007
Florida Half-Ironman Triathlon and Family Festival	May	Walt Disney World	2004	2005
Tri-America Series Finale		Walt Disney World	No	No
Danskin Women's Triathlon Series		Walt Disney World	No	No
Minnie Marathon Weekend	May	Walt Disney World	2006	2008
Expedition Everest Challenge	May	Disney's Animal Kingdom	2012	2015
Walt Disney World Triathlon	September	Walt Disney World	No	No
Wine & Dine Half Marathon	November	Walt Disney World	2010	—N/a
Star Wars Half Marathon — The Light Side	January	Disneyland	2015	2017
Tinker Bell Half-Marathon	May	Disneyland	2012	2017
Disneyland Half Marathon	January (Previously September (Labor Day weekend))	Disneyland	2006 (Original); 2024 (Revamped)	2018 (Original); 2026 (Revamped)
Disneyland Halloween Half Marathon	September	Disneyland	2024	2025
Avengers Super Heroes Half Marathon	November		2014	—N/a
Disneyland Paris Half Marathon	September	Disneyland Paris	2016	—N/a
Virtual Running Shorts Series	June–August	virtual/anywhere	2016	—N/a

=== Races ===
Race	Weekend	Inaugurated	Discontinued	Additional info
Walt Disney World Marathon	Walt Disney World Marathon	1994	—N/a	
Walt Disney World Half Marathon	Walt Disney World Marathon	1998	—N/a	originally called the Donald Half Marathon
Family Fun Run 5-K	Walt Disney World Marathon		—N/a	
Walt Disney World 10K	Walt Disney World Marathon	2014	—N/a	
Castaway Cay Challenge 5K	Walt Disney World Marathon	2015	—N/a	
Inline Marathon	Walt Disney World Inline	2003	2007	
Inline Half Marathon	Walt Disney World Inline	by 2005	2007	
Florida Half-Ironman Triathlon	Florida Half-Ironman Triathlon and Family Festival	2004	2005	
Kids Race	Florida Half-Ironman Triathlon and Family Festival	2004	2005	
National Kidney Foundation of Florida Gift of Life 5K Fun Run/Walk	—N/a	—N/a	—N/a	
Women Run the World 15K	Minnie Marathon Weekend	2006	2008	
Go Red For Women 5K	Minnie Marathon Weekend	2006	2008	
one-mile	Minnie Marathon Weekend	2006	2008	
Champion 5K	ESPN the Weekend	2009	2011	Disney's Hollywood Studios
Fun Run	ESPN the Weekend	2009	2011	Disney's Hollywood Studios
Princess Half-Marathon	Princess Half-Marathon	2009	—N/a	
Enchanted 10K	Princess Half-Marathon		—N/a	
Princess 5K	Princess Half-Marathon		—N/a	
Kids Dashes & One Mile	Princess Half-Marathon		—N/a	
Star Wars Half Marathon	Star Wars Half Marathon — The Dark Side	2016	2021	
Star Wars 10K	Star Wars Half Marathon — The Dark Side	2016	2021	
Star Wars 5K	Star Wars Half Marathon — The Dark Side	2016	2021	
runDisney Kids Races	Star Wars Half Marathon — The Dark Side	2016	2021	
Race for the Taste 10K	Race for the Taste/Food & Wine Festival (October)	1999	2009	originally the 10K Disney Classic until 2005, replaced by Wine & Dine Half
Disney's Cross Country Classic	Race for the Taste/Food & Wine Festival (October)			
Wine & Dine Half-Marathon	Wine & Dine Half Marathon/ Food & Wine Festival	2010	—N/a	
Wine & Dine 10K	Wine & Dine Half Marathon/ Food & Wine Festival	2016	—N/a	
Disney Fall Feast 5K	Wine & Dine Half Marathon/ Food & Wine Festival	2005	—N/a	formerly Race for the Cure 5K, Mickey's Holiday 5K (-2016), Halloween 5K and Jingle Jungle 5K; ran in Animal Kingdom
runDisney Kids Races	Wine & Dine Half Marathon/ Food & Wine Festival	—N/a	—N/a	
Half Marathon	Tinker Bell Half-Marathon	2012	—N/a	
Tinker Bell 10K	Tinker Bell Half-Marathon	—N/a	—N/a	
Never Land 5K	Tinker Bell Half-Marathon	—N/a	—N/a	
Kids Races	Tinker Bell Half-Marathon	—N/a	—N/a	
DL Half Marathon	Disneyland Half-Marathon	2006	—N/a	
Disneyland 10K	Disneyland Half-Marathon	2013	—N/a	
5K	Disneyland Half-Marathon	—N/a	—N/a	
Kids Races	Disneyland Half-Marathon	—N/a	—N/a	
Half Marathon	Avengers Super Heroes Half Marathon	2015	—N/a	
Thor 10K	Avengers Super Heroes Half Marathon	—N/a	—N/a	formerly Dr. Strange 10K
Spider-Man 5K	Avengers Super Heroes Half Marathon	—N/a	—N/a	formerly Captain America 5K
Kids Races	Avengers Super Heroes Half Marathon	—N/a	—N/a	
Half Marathon	Star Wars Half Marathon — The Light Side	2015	—N/a	the Light Side appended in 2016 with the additional of the Disney World base Star Wars Half Marathon - The Dark Side
Star Wars 10K	Star Wars Half Marathon — The Light Side	—N/a	—N/a	
Star Wars 5K	Star Wars Half Marathon — The Light Side	—N/a	—N/a	
Kids Races	Star Wars Half Marathon — The Light Side	—N/a	—N/a	
DLP Val d’ Europe Half-Marathon	Disneyland Paris (DLP) Half Marathon	2016	—N/a	
Paris 5K Family Run	Disneyland Paris (DLP) Half Marathon	2016	—N/a	
Paris 10K	Disneyland Paris (DLP) Half Marathon	2017	—N/a	
runDisney Kids Races	Disneyland Paris (DLP) Half Marathon	2016	—N/a	
Expedition Everest Challenge		2012	2015	nighttime 5K: part race, part obstacle course, and part scavenger hunt. The hunt clues lead to after race party.
Yellow Shoes 5K	Virtual Running Shorts Series	2016	—N/a	
Red Pants 5K	Virtual Running Shorts Series	2016	—N/a	
White Glove 5K	Virtual Running Shorts Series	2016	—N/a	

=== Race for the Taste ===
The Race for the Taste, formerly Disney Classic, was a 10K route that started at Disney's Wide World of Sports Complex, then went through Disney-MGM Studios' new attraction, Lights, Motors, Action! Extreme Stunt Show, then went along Disney's Yacht and Beach Club Resorts, and finished at the World Showcase in Epcot, where the Food and Wine Festival is taking place. A ceremonial toast kicked off the race while music and entertainment lined the route. Runners were required to maintain a 15-minute mile.

Athletes enjoyed a ceremonial toast to start the race. During the run, participants were entertained by festive music and entertainment. A "Go the Distance" Expo was held October 7–8 which in 2005 had a special wine debut, Miles of Magic, a California Syrah wine.

=== Race Challenges ===
Earn additional medals for completing multiple races.

- Disney Princess Half Marathon Weekend
  - Fairy Tale Challenge: run the 10K and half marathon
- Walt Disney World Weekend
  - Goofy Challenge (2006-): run the half and full marathons
  - Dopey Challenge (2014-): run all four Disney World weekend races
- Disneyland Half-Marathon Weekend
  - Dumbo Double Dare (2013—) running the 10K and the half marathon
  - Coast-to-Coast: run a half marathon in Orlando and in Anaheim in a single calendar year
- Disneyland Paris (DLP) Half Marathon Weekend
  - Castle to Chateau Challenge (2016-) in the same calendar year run one of the half marathon at Disneyland, the halfmarathon at Walt Disney World or the marathon at Walt Disney World plus run the half marathon at Disneyland Paris
  - Bibbidi Bobbidi Boo Cinderella (2017-) run both Paris 10K and a half marathon races
- Wine & Dine Half Marathon
  - Disney Two Course Challenge
