= Disneyland Paris Run Weekend =

Half marathon held in Marne-la-Valée, France

- Location: Disneyland Resort Paris
- Event type: road race
- Distance: half marathon
- Established: 2016
- Website: run.disneylandparis.com

The Disneyland Paris Run Weekend is an annual half marathon and weekend race series held every third weekend of September in Marne-la-Vallée, near Paris held by runDisney, a race series and division of Disney Sports Enterprises.

The half-marathon weekend currently (as of 2019) includes a 5K, a 10K and a Half Marathon, as well as the 31K, 36K, and Castle to Chateau Challenge.

== History ==
In 2016 the run weekend was launched for Disneyland Resort Paris. It was called the Disneyland Paris Half Marathon Weekend. The first halfmarathon, run in September 2016, featured 8,595 runners. The weekend also launched the 5K and the RunDisney Kids Races. It was the debut of the Castle to Chateau Challenge.

A 10K was added in 2017. A theme for the weekend was added. The Bibbidi Bobbidi Boo Challenge was added for the people who ran 31K, by running the 10K and the halfmarathon. At 25 September 2017 the name of the weekend was changed in the Disneyland Paris Magic Run Weekend.

In 2018 the 36K Challenge was added. At 24 September 2019 the weekend got renamed in the Disneyland Paris Run Weekend.

In September 2019, Disneyland Paris announced that the parks would host a Princess Run weekend in May 2020, similar as to what RunDisney organizes in Walt Disney World. The weekend would have launched the 5K and the 8K Princess Run. Both the Princess Run Weekend and the Disneyland Paris Run Weekend were cancelled because of the COVID-19 pandemic.

== Overview ==
=== Disneyland Paris Run Weekend ===
Year	Name	Start date	End date	Participants	Additional info
2016	Disneyland Paris Half Marathon	23 September	25 September	15,000	Inaugural
2017	Disneyland Paris Half Marathon	21 September	24 September	20,030	Magic theme
2018	Disneyland Paris Magic Run	20 September	23 September	26,000	Villains theme
2019	Disneyland Paris Run Weekend	19 September	22 September	27,000	Adventures theme
2020	Disneyland Paris Run Weekend	24 September	27 September	/	Cancelled of COVID-19 pandemic

=== Disneyland Paris Princess Run ===
Year	Start date	End date	Participants	Additional info
2020	8 May	10 May	/	Cancelled of COVID-19 pandemic

== Races ==
Name	Inaugurated	Additional info
Disneyland Paris Half Marathon	2016	
Disneyland Paris 5K	2016	is being held since 2017 at nightfall
RunDisney Kids Races	2016	there are 3 races: 100m, 200m and 1K
Disneyland Paris 10K	2017	

== Challenges ==
Name	Inaugurated	Additional info
Castle to Chateau Challenge	2016	Doing a Halfmarathon at Walt Disney World or Disneyland Resort and at the Disneyland Paris Run Weekend in the same calendar year
31K Challenge	2017	Doing the 10K and the Halfmarathon during the same weekend. Originally called the Bibbidi Bobbidi Boo Challenge
36K Challenge	2018	Doing the 5K, the 10K and the Halfmarathon during the same weekend

== Winners ==
=== Half marathon ===
Year	Men's winner	Time (h:m:s)	Women's winner	Time (h:m:s)
2019	Andrew Fleming (UK)	1:12:10	Julie Bernard (FRA)	1:26:07
2018	Cesar Diaz (FRA)	1:11:24	Paula Radcliffe (UK)	1:23:18
2017	Fékhir Mondhir (FRA)	1:10:30	Paula Radcliffe (UK)	1:22:12
2016	Nicolas Dalmasso (FRA)	1:13:51	Paula Radcliffe (UK)	1:24:05
