= Julie Henner =

American middle-distance runner

Juli Henner
Personal information
- Born: May 13, 1970 (age 56) El Paso, Texas, United States

Sport
- Sport: Middle-distance running
- Event: 1500 metres
Medal record
Representing United States
Summer Universiade
Silver medal – second place	1993 Buffalo	1500 m
Silver medal – second place	1995 Fukuoka	1500 m

Julianne Henner (born May 13, 1970) is an American former middle-distance runner. She competed in the women's 1500 metres at the 1996 Summer Olympics. She was born in El Paso, Texas.

She was a member of the James Madison Dukes track and field program, where she placed 10th in the 1992 NCAA Division I Outdoor Track and Field Championships 1500 metres.
