= Oxana Juravel =

Moldovan long-distance runner

Oxana Juravel (born 23 February 1986) is a Moldovan long-distance runner who specializes in the 3000 metres steeplechase.

She competed at the 2008 Olympic Games, but without reaching the final, and finished in 12th place in the 2010 European Athletics Championships – Women's 3000 metres steeplechase final held in Barcelona, Spain, but after two steeplechaser medalists, Lyubov Kharlamova and Marta Domínguez, were subsequently disqualified for doping violations, Juravel was in fact the tenth best in the final.

Her personal best time is 9:46.88 minutes, achieved in June 2008 in Banská Bystrica, (Slovakia).
