= Eufemiano Fuentes =

Spanish sports doctor (born 1955)

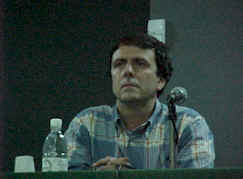
Fuentes in 2000

Eufemiano Fuentes (born 1955) is a Spanish sports doctor who was implicated in the Operación Puerto doping case.

== Biography ==
Fuentes was once an athlete. He then became the team doctor of Team ONCE, Amaya and Kelme. The former Kelme rider Jesús Manzano accused Fuentes of being involved with doping.

Team doctor of the Kelme team in 2005. At that time he had been the doctor of the Kelme team for 16 months. He announced that he was retiring from involvement with professional cycling, citing health and family reasons as well as a desire to investigate retinoblastoma cancer in the Instituto del Cáncer de Canarias.

Fuentes was arrested by the Guardia Civil on May 22, 2006, together with four others: the manager of the Liberty Seguros team Manolo Saiz, José Luis Merino a haematologist at an analytical laboratory in Madrid, Alberto León, a professional mountain biker, and José Ignacio Labarta, who was at that time the assistant sports director of Comunidad Valenciana.

In Fuentes' clinic in Madrid, 186 blood bags were found belonging to professional athletes and marked with coded names, besides EPO, steroids, and growth hormone. The scandal that grew from the arrests implicated well-known road racing cyclists and include former Tour de France favourites Jan Ullrich, Ivan Basso, Francisco Mancebo, Michele Scarponi, Tyler Hamiliton, José Enrique Gutiérrez Cataluña, Roberto Heras, Dario Pieri and large parts of the Comunitat Valenciana and former Liberty Seguros cycling squads. Alberto Contador was also a suspect, but was later cleared of any involvement by the Spanish courts and world cycling's governing body, the UCI. Fuentes continually denied having performed illegal operations. He said that he did not work exclusively with cyclists but had other athletes as clients such as footballers and tennis players. In December 2010, a fellow inmate claimed Fuentes had told him, "If I would talk, the Spanish football team would be stripped of the 2010 World Cup". Fuentes denied having said this in a 2013 interview.

In a further doping scandal, in 2010, Fuentes was arrested by Spanish police as part of Operación Galgo (Operation Greyhound). In a series of simultaneous raids across five provinces on 9 December, Spanish police seized a large quantity of anabolic steroids, hormones and EPO, as well as laboratory equipment for blood transfusions. According to Público newspaper, Eufemiano Fuentes and his sister Yolanda were the leaders of the alleged plot. Also arrested were the athlete Marta Domínguez, who was released on bail after having been charged with the trafficking and distribution of doping substances, and Alberto Leon, in whose fridge anti-doping police found several bags of blood. Leon was found dead shortly after, the result of an apparent suicide. In January 2013, the Operacion Puerto trial went underway, and Fuentes offered to reveal the names of all the athletes he helped doping. The judge, Julia Santamaria, told him that he was not under obligations to name any other athletes others than the cyclists implicated. Fuentes stated that he supplied athletes in other sports with drugs and said: "I could identify all the samples [of blood]. If you give me a list I could tell you who corresponds to each code on the [blood] packs."

Spain lacking anti-doping laws, Fuentes was charged with "endangering public health". His main defense consisted in saying that the blood transfusions were conducted safely and were healthy for the athletes. This point of view was highly contested, notably by former clients and cyclists Jesús Manzano and Jörg Jaksche, who claimed that the blood transfusions were performed in dangerous conditions and put their health at risk.

In April 2013, Fuentes was sentenced to one year in prison for breaking public health laws and was banned from practicing sports medicine for four years. On 14 June 2016, the verdict was overruled and Fuentes was cleared of all charges. However, 211 blood bags from his laboratory were handed over to the World Anti Doping Association for investigation.
