= Wioletta Frankiewicz =

Polish runner (born 1977)

Personal information
- Nationality: Polish
- Born: 9 June 1977 (age 49) Piotrków Trybunalski, Poland

Sport
- Event: Middle-distance
Medal record
Women's athletics
Representing Poland
European Championships
Bronze medal – third place	2006 Gothenburg	3000m steeplechase
Bronze medal – third place	2010 Barcelona	3000m steeplechase

Wioletta Frankiewicz (née Janowska) (born 9 June 1977 in Piotrków Trybunalski) is a Polish runner. She competes in the 1500 metres, but she competes also in the 3000 metre steeplechase event, as she did in the 10th IAAF World Championships in Athletics in Helsinki, Finland. She weighs 58 kilograms and is 1.77 metres tall. She won National Indoor Championships in 2003 (800 m). She also won the National outdoor championships in 2004 (5000 m) and in 2005 (1500 m).

She won the bronze medal in the inaugural 3000 m steeplechase for women at the 2006 European Athletics Championships in Gothenburg.

== Achievements ==
Year	Competition	Venue	Position	Notes
Representing Poland
2003	European Indoor Cup	Leipzig, Germany	3rd	3000 m
2005	SPAR European Cup	Florence, Italy	2nd	5000 m
2006	European Championships	Gothenburg, Sweden	3rd	3000 m s'chase
2010	European Championships	Barcelona, Spain	3rd	3000 m s'chase

=== Personal bests ===
- 800 metres: 2:06.86
- 1000 metres: 2:36.97
- 1500 metres: 4:03.09
- 3000 metres: 8:44.22
- 5000 metres: 15:08.38
- 10000 metres: 32:16.27
- 15 kilometres: 51:29
- 3000 m steeplechase: 9:17.15

== See also ==
- Polish records in athletics

Sporting positions
Preceded by (Uganda) Dorcus Inzikuru	Women's 3000 m Steeplechase; Best Year Performance; 2006	Succeeded by (Russia) Yekaterina Volkova
