= 2010 European Athletics Championships – Women's 3000 metres steeplechase =

Women's 3000 metres steeplechase at the European Athletics Championships

The women's 3000 metres steeplechase at the 2010 European Athletics Championships was held at the Estadi Olímpic Lluís Companys on 28 and 30 July.

== Medalists ==
In the original running of the event, Marta Dominguez of Spain was awarded the silver medal, but she was disqualified and her result nullified. As a result, Lyubov Kharlamova was promoted to the silver medal, and Hattie Archer, who at the time ran under her maidan name of Hattie Dean, was awarded the bronze medal, the first major women's medal for a British steeplechaser.

On 18 August 2017 Court of Arbitration for Sport (CAS) announced that Kharlamova had also been disqualified for doping offences following retesting. As a result, she too was disqualified, and her result nullified. As a result, Archer/Dean will be promoted to the silver medal, and Wioletta Frankiewicz of Poland will be promoted to the bronze medal, although reallocations have yet to be confirmed. As such, until reallocation, the silver medal position remains vacant In 2018, the reallocation was confirmed, and Hattie Archer received her medal 8 years later at the Birmingham Grand Prix.

Gold	Yuliya Zarudneva; Russia (RUS)
Silver	(United Kingdom) Hatti Dean; Great Britain (GBR)
Bronze	Wioletta Frankiewicz; Poland (POL)

== Records ==
Standing records prior to the 2010 European Athletics Championships
World record	Gulnara Samitova (RUS)	8:58.81	Beijing, PR China	17 August 2008
European record	Gulnara Samitova (RUS)	8:58.81	Beijing, PR China	17 August 2008
Championship record	Alesya Turava (BLR)	9:26.05	Gothenburg, Sweden	12 August 2006
World Leading	Milcah Chemos Cheywa (KEN)	9:11.71	Rome, Italy	10 June 2010
European Leading	Marta Domínguez (ESP)	9:17.07	Huelva, Spain	9 June 2010
Broken records during the 2010 European Athletics Championships
Championship record	Yuliya Zarudneva (RUS)	9:17.57	Barcelona, Spain	30 July 2010

== Schedule ==
Date	Time	Round
28 July 2010	11:30	Round 1
30 July 2010	20:25	Final

== Results ==
=== Round 1 ===
==== Heat 1 ====
Rank	Name	Nationality	Time	Notes
1	Wioletta Frankiewicz	Poland	9:46.38	Q
2	Yuliya Zarudneva	Russia	9:46.40	Q
3	Hatti Dean	Great Britain & N.I.	9:46.43	Q
4	Ancuţa Bobocel	Romania	9:48.01	Q
5	Zulema Fuentes-Pila	Spain	9:50.97	q
6	Rosa María Morató	Spain	9:53.96	
7	Sandra Eriksson	Finland	9:55.73	
8	Lívia Tóth	Hungary	10:03.97	
9	Lyudmila Kuzmina	Russia	10:10.83	
10	Stephanie O'Reilly	Ireland	10:13.94	
	Iríni Kokkinaríou	Greece	DNF	Doping

==== Heat 2 ====
Rank	Name	Nationality	Time	Notes
1	Layes Abdullayeva	Azerbaijan	9:40.42	Q, NR
DQ	Lyubov Kharlamova	Russia	~~9:40.81~~	Q, Doping
2	Katarzyna Kowalska	Poland	9:41.14	Q
DQ	Marta Domínguez	Spain	~~9:41.93~~	Q, Doping
3	Sophie Duarte	France	9:42.33	q
4	Fionnuala Britton	Ireland	9:44.84	q
5	Oxana Juravel	Moldova	9:53.43	q
6	Marcela Lustigová	Czech Republic	10:05.22	
7	Binnaz Uslu	Turkey	10:15.28	
8	Barbara Parker	Great Britain & N.I.	10:20.99	
	Ulrika Johansson	Sweden	DNF	

==== Summary ====
Rank	Heat	Name	Nationality	Time	Notes
1	2	Layes Abdullayeva	Azerbaijan	9:40.42	Q, NR
DQ	2	Lyubov Kharlamova	Russia	~~9:40.81~~	Q
2	2	Katarzyna Kowalska	Poland	9:41.14	Q
DQ	2	Marta Domínguez	Spain	~~9:41.93~~	Q
3	2	Sophie Duarte	France	9:42.33	q
4	2	Fionnuala Britton	Ireland	9:44.84	q
5	1	Wioletta Frankiewicz	Poland	9:46.38	Q
6	1	Yuliya Zarudneva	Russia	9:46.40	Q
7	1	Hatti Dean	Great Britain & N.I.	9:46.43	Q
8	1	Ancuţa Bobocel	Romania	9:48.01	Q
9	1	Zulema Fuentes-Pila	Spain	9:50.97	q
10	2	Oxana Juravel	Moldova	9:53.43	q
11	1	Rosa María Morató	Spain	9:53.96	
12	1	Sandra Eriksson	Finland	9:55.73	
13	1	Lívia Tóth	Hungary	10:03.97	
14	2	Marcela Lustigová	Czech Republic	10:05.22	
15	1	Lyudmila Kuzmina	Russia	10:10.83	
16	1	Stephanie O'Reilly	Ireland	10:13.94	
17	2	Binnaz Uslu	Turkey	10:15.28	
18	2	Barbara Parker	Great Britain & N.I.	10:20.99	
	2	Ulrika Johansson	Sweden	DNF	
	1	Iríni Kokkinaríou	Greece	DNF	Doping

=== Final ===
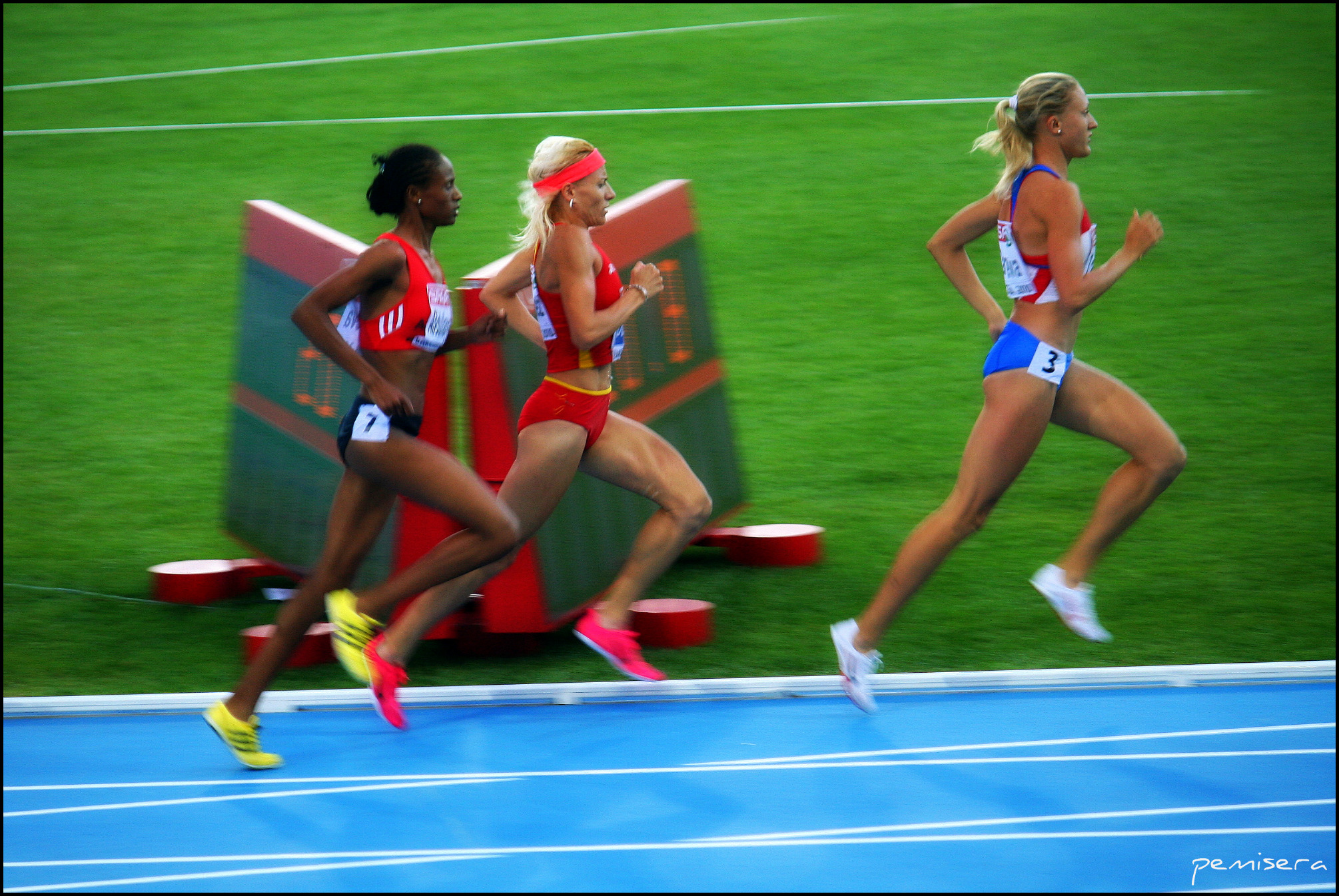
Zarudneva (right) maintained her lead to take her first European medal in Championship-record time.

Rank	Name	Nationality	Time	Notes
1st place, gold medalist(s)	Yuliya Zarudneva	Russia	9:17.57	CR
DQ	Marta Domínguez	Spain	~~9:17.74~~	Doping
DQ	Lyubov Kharlamova	Russia	~~9:29.82~~	~~SB~~, Doping
2nd place, silver medalist(s)	Hatti Dean	Great Britain & N.I.	9:30.19	PB
3rd place, bronze medalist(s)	Wioletta Frankiewicz	Poland	9:34.13	
4	Layes Abdullayeva	Azerbaijan	9:34.75	NR
5	Sophie Duarte	France	9:35.52	SB
6	Zulema Fuentes-Pila	Spain	9:35.71	SB
7	Ancuţa Bobocel	Romania	9:41.20	
8	Katarzyna Kowalska	Poland	9:42.47	
9	Fionnuala Britton	Ireland	9:44.25	
10	Oxana Juravel	Moldova	9:55.39	

Notes:

- Marta Domínguez was disqualified for doping offences in November 2015.
- Lyubov Kharlamova was disqualified for doping offences in August 2017.
