= Serenella Sbrissa =

Italian runner

Personal information
- Nationality: Italian
- Born: 13 July 1967 (age 59)

Sport
- Country: Italy
- Sport: Athletics
- Events: Middle-distance running Long-distance running

Achievements and titles
- Personal bests: 800 m: 2:05.23 (2006); 1500 m: 4:09.63 (1996); One mile: 4:37.00 (1998); Half marathon: 1:23:44 (2003)

Serenella Sbrissa (born 13 July 1967) is a former Italian female middle and long-distance runner who competed at one edition of the IAAF World Cross Country Championships at senior level (1998).

== Biography ==
She won 8 national championships at senior level.

== National titles ==
- Italian Athletics Championships
  - 800 m: 1994, 1996
  - 1500 m: 1994, 1996, 1997, 1998
- Italian Athletics Indoor Championships
  - 1500 m: 1997
  - 3000 m: 1997
