= Zulema Fuentes-Pila =

Spanish middle-distance runner

Zulema Fuentes-Pila Ortiz (born May 25, 1977 in Requejada, Cantabria) is a Spanish middle distance runner.

She finished eighth in 1500 metres at the 2002 European Indoor Championships. At the 2006 European Athletics Championships in Gothenburg she finished eighth in the 3000 m steeplechase, breaking the Spanish national record with 9:40.36 minutes.

She and her sisters Margarita and Iris were selected for the Spanish 2007 European Indoor Championships team.

== Competition record ==
| Year | Competition | Venue | Position | Event | Notes |
Representing Spain
| 2001 | Mediterranean Games | Radès, Tunisia | 7th | 1500 m | 4:20.44 |
| 2002 | European Indoor Championships | Vienna, Austria | 8th | 1500 m | 4:15.23 |
| 2003 | World Indoor Championships | Birmingham, United Kingdom | 12th (h) | 1500 m | 4:12.03 |
| 2004 | Ibero-American Championships | Huelva, Spain | 3rd | 5000 m | 15:56.80 |
| 2006 | European Championships | Gothenburg, Sweden | 8th | 3000 m s'chase | 9:40.36 |
| 2007 | European Indoor Championships | Birmingham, United Kingdom | 10th (h) | 1500 m | 4:17.42 |
| 2007 | World Championships | Osaka, Japan | 26th (h) | 3000 m s'chase | 9:55.62 |
| 2008 | Olympic Games | Beijing, China | 12th | 3000 m s'chase | 9:35.16 |
| 2010 | Ibero-American Championships | San Fernando, Spain | 2nd | 3000 m s'chase | 9:53.75 |
| 2010 | European Championships | Barcelona, Spain | 6th | 3000 m s'chase | 9:35.71 |
| 2012 | European Championships | Helsinki, Finland | 15th | 3000 m s'chase | 10:05.06 |

== Personal bests ==
- 800 metres - 2:03.67 min (2004)
- 1500 metres - 4:04.72 min (2004)
- 3000 metres - 8:59.20 min (2004)
- 3000 metres steeplechase - 9:35.16 min (2008)
- 5000 metres - 15:56.80 min (2004)
