= Yuliya Zaripova =

Russian middle-distance runner

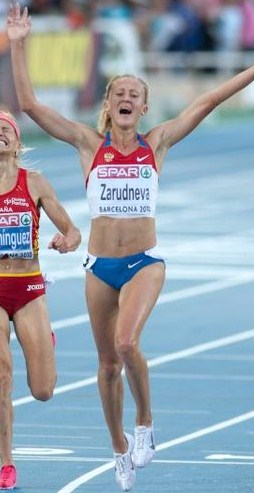
- Zaripova at the 2010 European Athletics Championships

Personal information
- Nationality: Russian
- Born: 26 April 1986 (age 40)
- Height: 1.72 m (5 ft 7 1/2 in)
- Weight: 54 kg (119 lb)
Medal record
Women's athletics
Representing Russia
Olympic Games
Disqualified	2012 London	3000 m st.
World Championships
Silver medal – second place	2009 Berlin	3000 m st.
Disqualified	2011 Daegu	3000 m st.
European Championships
Gold medal – first place	2010 Barcelona	3000 m st.
Continental Cup
Gold medal – first place	2010 Split	3000 m st.

Yuliya Mikhailovna Zaripova (Russian: Юлия Михайловна Зарипова, née Ivanova (Russian: Иванова), divorced Zarudneva (Russian: Заруднева); born 26 April 1986 in Svetly Yar, Volgograd Oblast) is a disgraced former Russian middle-distance runner who specialised in the 3000 metres steeplechase event.

== Career ==
Zaripova's first continental medals came at the 2008 European Cross Country Championships, where she won the bronze medal and silver team medal with Russia in the women's under-23 race. The following year she became the Russian indoor champion in the 3000 metres and took part in the women's 3000 m at the 2009 European Athletics Indoor Championships, finishing in seventh place.

Zaripova attended her first World Championships that year and ran a personal best of 9:08.39 in the 3000 m steeplechase. Despite her relative lack of experience, this was enough for a silver medal behind Marta Domínguez, and she beat her more favoured compatriot, Gulnara Samitova-Galkina, who was the reigning Olympic champion. In the summer the following year she won at the 2010 European Team Championships, setting a championship record, and also competed on the IAAF Diamond League circuit, winning at the DN Galan. She won the gold medal at the 2010 European Athletics Championships. Zaripova closed her season with a win at the 2010 IAAF Continental Cup in a championship record time.

She was initially awarded the gold medal in the steeplechase at the 2011 World Championships in Athletics, improving from her runner-up placing in 2009. Zaripova began 2012 with a win at the Volgograd 10K in May. She was awarded the gold medal in the 3000 m steeplechase at the 2012 Summer Olympics in a new personal best time of 9:06.72 but was later disqualified for doping charges.

=== Doping ===
On 30 January 2015, the IOC announced that Zaripova was sanctioned for an anti-doping rule violation based on abnormal parameters of the athletes' haematological profiles within the framework of the biological passport programme of the IAAF. Her results from 20 June 2011 to 20 August 2011 and 3 July 2012 to 3 September 2012 were annulled, and she was banned from competition for 2 years and 6 months from 25 July 2013. On 25 March 2015, the IAAF filed an appeal with the Court of Arbitration in Lausanne, Switzerland, questioning the selective disqualification of the suspension periods of the six athletes involved including Zaripova. On 24 March 2016, the Court of Arbitration for Sport disqualified Zaripova's results from 20 July 2011 to 25 July 2013. She was stripped of her 2011 World Championships gold medal and her 2012 Summer Olympics gold medal.

On 21 November 2016, the International Olympic Committee announced that Zaripova tested positive for the anabolic steroid Turinabol on a urine sample she provided after the women's 3,000-meter steeplechase final at the 2012 Summer Olympics on 6 August 2012.

== See also ==
- Doping at the Olympic Games
- Doping at the World Athletics Championships
- Doping in Russia
- List of doping cases in athletics
- List of stripped Olympic medals
- Steeplechase at the Olympics
- Steeplechase at the World Athletics Championships
- List of World Athletics Championships medalists (women)
- List of European Athletics Championships medalists (women)
- List of Russian sportspeople
