= Lyubov Kharlamova =

Russian long-distance runner

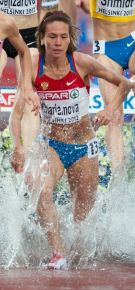
- Lyubov Kharlamova in 2012

Personal information
- Nationality: Russian
- Born: Lyubov Ivanova; 2 March 1981 (age 45)

Sport
- Country: Russia

Lyubov Kharlamova (Russian: Любовь Харламова), née Ivanova (Иванова, born 2 March 1981) is a Russian long-distance runner who specializes in the 3000 metres steeplechase.

She finished fourth at the 2006 European Athletics Championships in Gothenburg and fourth at the 2006 IAAF World Athletics Final, but tested positive in a doping test for a steroid and received a two-year doping ban.

She finished third in the 2010 European Athletics Championships – Women's 3000 metres steeplechase but on 18 August 2017 the Court of Arbitration for Sport (CAS) announced that Kharlamova had been disqualified for doping offences following retesting.

== Personal bests ==
- 1500 metres – 4:11.49 min (2003)
- 3000 metres – 9:11.34 min (2004)
- 3000 metres steeplechase – 9:21.94 min (2006)

== See also ==
- List of doping cases in athletics
- List of stripped European Athletics Championships medals
