= Marta Domínguez =

Spanish runner and politician

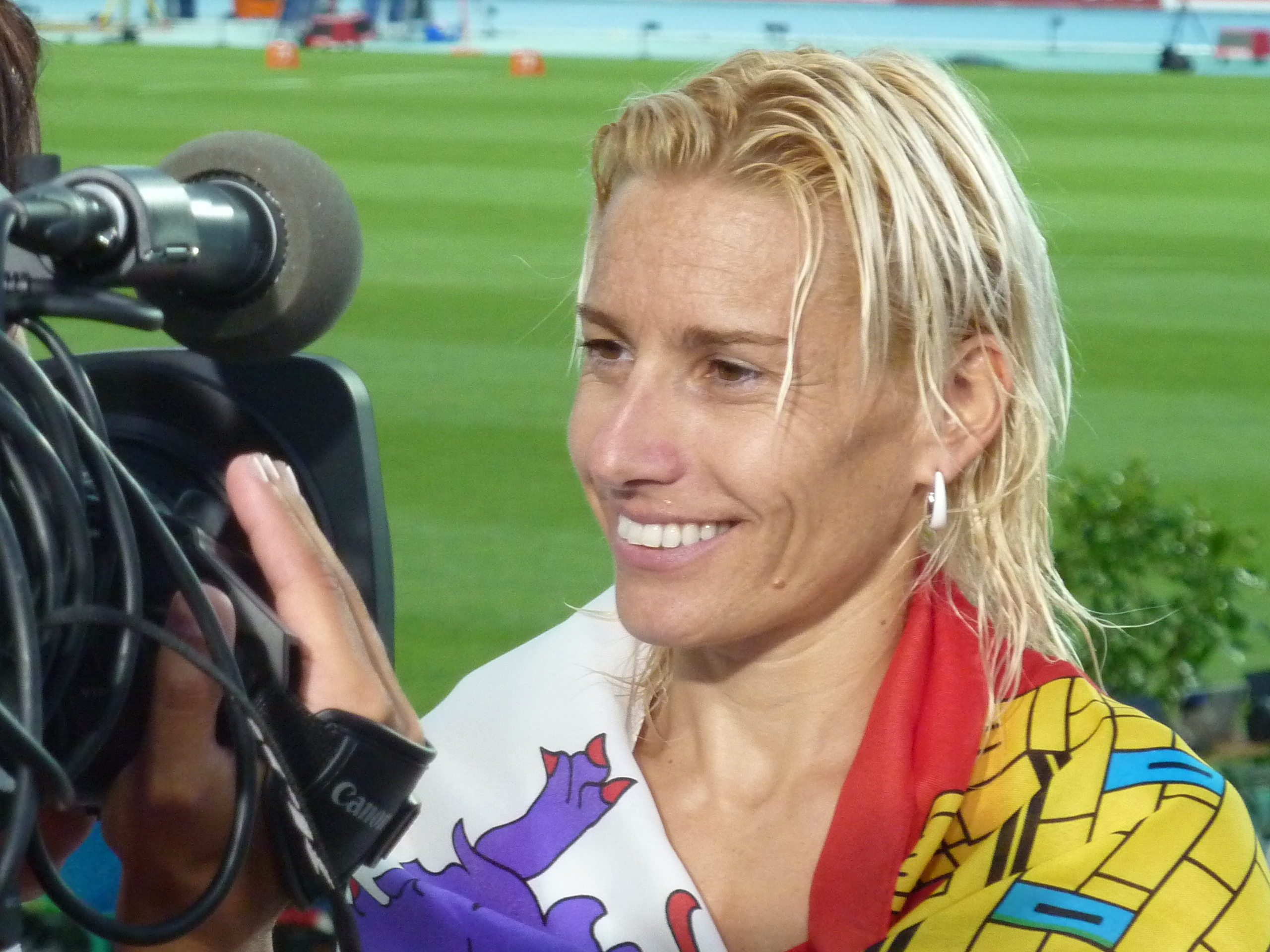

Personal information
- Full name: Marta Domínguez Azpeleta
- Nationality: Spanish
- Born: 3 November 1975 (age 50) Palencia, Spain
- Height: 1.63 m (5 ft 4 in)
- Weight: 52 kg (115 lb)
- Website: www.martadominguez.es

Sport
- Country: Spain
- Sport: Athletics
Medal record
Women's athletics
Representing Spain
World Championships
Silver medal – second place	2001 Edmonton	5000 m
Silver medal – second place	2003 Paris	5000 m
Disqualified	2009 Berlin	3000 m st.
World Indoor Championships
Silver medal – second place	2003 Birmingham	3000 m
European Championships
Gold medal – first place	2002 Munich	5000 m
Gold medal – first place	2006 Gothenburg	5000 m
Bronze medal – third place	1998 Budapest	5000 m
Disqualified	2010 Barcelona	3000 m st.
European Cross Country Championships
Gold medal – first place	2007 Toro	Senior race

Marta Domínguez

Designated Spanish Senator for Palencia
- Incumbent
- Assumed office 13 December 2011

Marta Domínguez Azpeleta (born 3 November 1975) is a Spanish former runner and politician. She competes mainly in the steeplechase. She has represented Spain four times at the Olympics and has competed at the World Championships on six occasions.

As a 5000m runner, Domínguez won a bronze at the 1998 European Athletics Championships and reached the global podium at the 2001 World Championships in Athletics, winning the silver medal. She scored a gold medal double in 2002 by taking a 3000 metres win at the European Athletics Indoor Championships, before going on to become European champion at the 2002 European Championships. She achieved silver medals in the same events at the IAAF World Indoor Championships and 2003 World Championships in Athletics the following year. She retained her European crown at the 2006 European Athletics Championships.

Domínguez has been accused of both dealing and using performance-enhancing drugs on multiple occasions. In December 2010, she was arrested for her connection in a doping ring as part of Operación Galgo; she was acquitted in 2011. In May 2013, it was reported that Domínguez had failed a bio-passport test in 2009. In 2015, she was banned from competing for three years by the Court of Arbitration for Sport for irregularities in her biological passport and stripped of her status as a Spanish national athlete. This annulled all of Domínguez's competitive results from August 2009 to July 2013, including her 2009 world championship in steeplechase. Her personal best in the steeplechase is now listed by the IAAF as 9:09.39 from the last race she ran six days before the official doping ban period went into place.

== Career ==
Domínguez competed early in her career at 1,500, 5,000 and 10,000 metres. She competed as a 20-year old in the 1996 Summer Olympics, finishing 9th in her initial heat in the 1,500m event. In 1998 Domínguez won her first championship medal in the European Championships in Budapest in the 5,000m, winning bronze behind Sonia O'Sullivan, who won gold and Gabriela Szabo, who took silver. In 2002, she won these events at the European indoor and outdoor championships, and won her second straight title in 2006 in the 5,000 metres at the European outdoor championship (also obtaining the Championship Record). She also has silver medals from the World Championships in 2001 and 2003, and she was named Spanish Athlete of the Year in both years.

Domínguez is a six-time national champion in the women's 5,000 metres. Her only Olympic appearance in the event was in 2000. She missed the 2004 Summer Olympics due to injury and returned in 2005 with a 14th place at the World Championships.

In 2006, after winning the gold medal at the European Championship in the 5,000 metres, she became the most decorated Spanish athlete ever. She also broke the Spanish record at the 10,000 metres at the same event, where she finished 7th. In addition to her track career she has competed in cross country running, winning the Cross de Atapuerca in 2006 and taking the title at the European Cross Country Championships the following year. She ended 2007 with a win at Palencia's most prominent international athletics competition, the Cross Internacional de Venta de Baños.

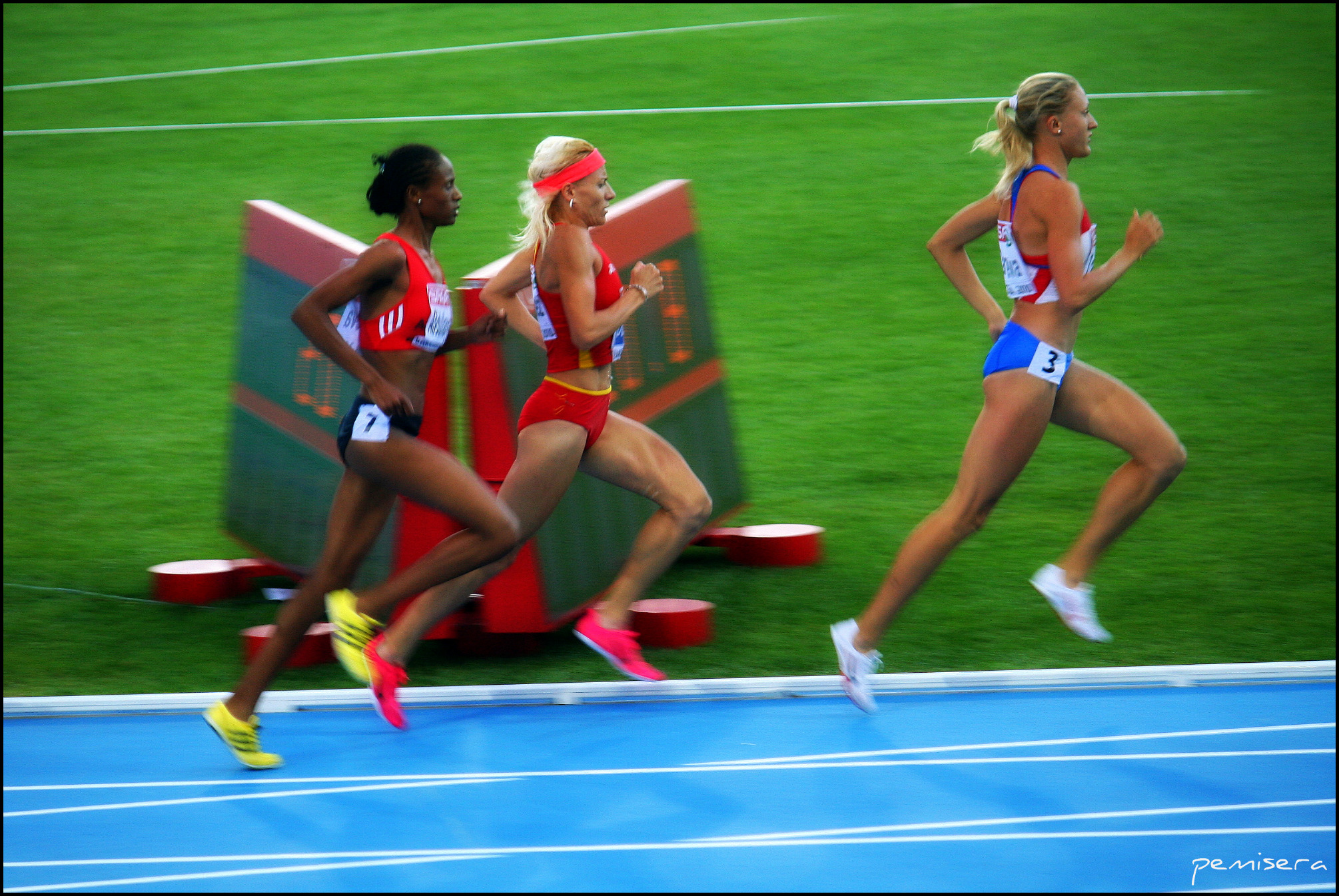
Marta Domínguez shadowing Zarudneva en route to silver in the 2010 European final.

During the 2008 season, Domínguez started running the 3,000 metre steeplechase, breaking the Spanish record in her first race. Contesting the event at the 2008 Summer Olympics, Domínguez was among the leaders with 250 metres to go, when she clipped a barrier and fell to the track. She did not finish the race.

Domínguez beat her own 3,000 metre steeplechase national record by over five seconds at a track meet in Málaga in June 2009. Following her improvements, she downplayed talk of medals at the 2009 World Championships, stating that she was only focusing on improving her technique and that Olympic Champion Gulnara Samitova-Galkina was a strong favourite. She then went on to win the gold medal in the event.

In 2010, she ran at the Cursa de Bombers in Barcelona and finished in third, despite suffering from an illness in the week prior to the event. In July 2010 she won a silver medal at the 2010 European Athletics Championships in Barcelona. She and Yuliya Zarudneva engaged in a duel for the title, but it was the Russian who prevailed, reversing their positions at the World Championships the previous year. Domínguez was not disappointed to lose, however, saying "I can't complain as I have been European champion twice in the 5,000m... It's impossible to win always." Domínguez fell pregnant that year and ruled herself out of the 2011 season in order to focus on starting a family with her husband Diego Bercianos.

Domínguez competed in her fourth Olympics in 2012 in London in the steeplechase. At 36, she was the oldest athlete in the final round, where she finished 12th.

=== 2010 doping arrest ===
In December 2010, Domínguez, together with 13 other people including her coach, were arrested during "Operación Galgo" (Operation Greyhound), a major criminal investigation into sports doping carried out by the Guardia Civil. Her home was raided and several items were taken including her laptop, a briefcase and a box. Domínguez was released on charges of trafficking and distribution of doping substances. She was also suspended from her position as vice president of the Spanish Athletics Federation. According to the newspaper, Público, the leader of the alleged ring was Dr Eufemiano Fuentes and his sister Yolanda, the former also being at the centre of the notorious Operación Puerto doping ring in 2006. The lack of prosecutions arising from Operación Puerto led to criticism of the Spanish authorities for an apparently ineffective approach to doping in sport, and prompted the Spanish government to pass tougher anti-doping legislation that now makes the supply and use of performance-enhancing drugs illegal, with penalties including jail terms.

According to El País, the investigations conducted by the Guardia Civil under Operación Galgo have also directly implicated Domínguez in the Operación Puerto doping ring. A blood bag seized during the Puerto investigation, and which Eufemiano Fuentes had recorded as belonging to an athlete whom he codenamed "Rosa", accompanied by her mobile telephone number, was attributed to Marta Domínguez.

According to El País, in July 2010 Domínguez was being wiretapped by the Guardia Civil. She was taped talking, among others, with Alberto Garcia, a Spanish runner banned in 2003 for using EPO, an illegal substance. In one conversation presented at the trial Domínguez, according to Garcia, asked him for how long EPO is detectable in blood tests after use. However, the judge ruled that the wiretapping of Domínguez phone was not justified, and ordered to exclude this and all other conversations from evidence of the trial.

The judge later acquitted her when it was found the substances that were believed to be illegal were in fact legal.

=== 2015 doping ban ===
On 19 November 2015, she was banned for three years by the Court of Arbitration for Sport and was stripped of her 2009 gold medal from the IAAF World Championships in Berlin. The punishment stems from Domínguez's ties to doping as well as issues with her biological passport. All of Domínguez's results from 5 August 2009 until 8 July 2013 have been nullified, making her eligible to return to competition in 2018.

== Politics ==
In November 2011, Domínguez was elected one of Palencia's four members of the Senate of Spain in the 2011 general election. She ran under a People's Party list.

== Personal bests ==
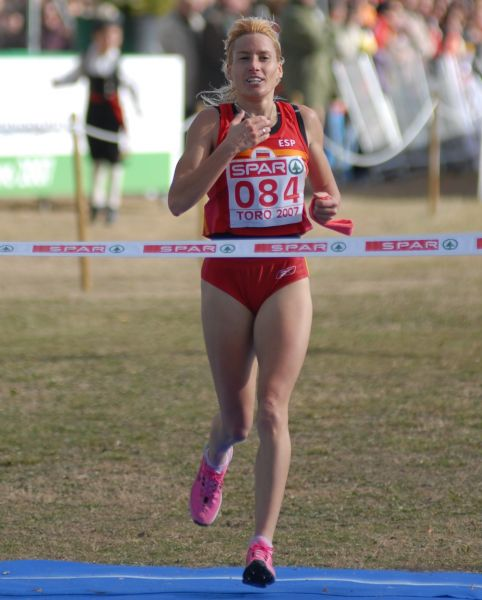
Domínguez winning the 2007 European Cross Country Championships

- 1500 metres - 4:06.08 (2000)
- 3000 metres - 8:28.80 (2000)
- 5000 metres - 14:48.33 (2003)
- 10,000 metres - 30:51.69 (2006)
- 3000 m steeplechase - 9:09.39 (2009), 9:07.32 (2009, annulled due to doping violation)

== Achievements ==
Year	Competition	Venue	Position	Event	Notes
Representing Spain
1994	World Junior Championships	Lisbon, Portugal	2nd	1500 m	4:14.59
1995	World Indoor Championships	Barcelona, Spain	6th	3000 m	9:01.79
1996	European Indoor Championships	Stockholm, Sweden	3rd	3000 m	8:53.34
1997	World Indoor Championships	Paris, France	5th	3000 m	8:52.74
1997	European U23 Championships	Turku, Finland	5th	1500m	4:16.95
1997	European U23 Championships	Turku, Finland	3rd	5000m	15:49.96
1998	European Indoor Championships	Valencia, Spain	3rd	3000 m	8:57.72
1998	European Championships	Budapest, Hungary	3rd	5000 m	15:10.54
1999	World Championships	Seville, Spain	9th	5000 m	15:16.93
2000	European Indoor Championships	Ghent, Belgium	3rd	3000 m	8:44.08
2001	World Indoor Championships	Lisbon, Portugal	4th	3000 m	8:40.98
2001	World Championships	Edmonton, Canada	2nd	5000 m	15:06.59
2002	European Indoor Championships	Vienna, Austria	1st	3000 m	8:53.87
2002	European Championships	Munich, Germany	1st	5000 m	15:14.76
2003	World Indoor Championships	Birmingham, England	2nd	3000 m	8:42.17
2003	World Championships	Paris, France	2nd	5000 m	14:52.26
2004	World Indoor Championships	Budapest, Hungary	4th	3000 m	9:12.85
2006	European Championships	Gothenburg, Sweden	1st	5000 m	14:56.18
2006	European Championships	Gothenburg, Sweden	7th	10,000 m	30:51.69
2007	European Indoor Championships	Birmingham, England	2nd	3000 m	8:44.40
2007	European Cross Country Championships	Toro, Spain	1st	Senior race (8.2 km)	26:58

Awards
Preceded by Virginia Ruano; Anabel Medina	Spanish Sportswoman of the Year; 2009	Succeeded by Edurne Pasaban
