= 2006 European Champion Clubs Cup =

- Host city: Valencia, Spain (Group A); Istanbul, Turkey (Group B)
- Dates: 26-27 May 2006

The 2006 European Champion Clubs Cup (ECCC) in athletics was held in Valencia, Spain and Istanbul, Turkey, from 27 to 28 May.

== Results ==
Men's winning clubs

Games	Gold	Silver	Bronze
First Division (Group A)	SC Luch Moscow (RUS)	Gruppi Sportivi Fiamme Gialle (POL)	Sporting Clube de Portugal (POR)

Women's winning clubs

Games	Gold	Silver	Bronze
First Division (Group A)	SC Luch Moscow (RUS)	Valencia Terra i Mar (ESP)	ACSI Italia Atletica (ITA)

=== First Division (Group A) ===
Men

Event	First		Second		Third	
100m	Dwight Thomas (JAM)	10.28	Andrey Yepishin (RUS)	10.29	Koura Fantoni Kaba (ITA)	10.33
200m	Dwight Thomas (JAM)	20.60	Koura Fantoni Kaba (ITA)	20.70	Panayiótis Sarrís (GRE)	21.21
400m	Claudio Licciardello (ITA)	46.41	David Canal (ESP)	47.13	Karel Bláha (CZE)	47.22
800m	Dmitriy Bogdanov (RUS)	1:49.12	William Chirchir (KEN)	1:49.26	Jeff Lastennet (FRA)	1:49.88
1500m	Rui Silva (POR)	3:39.40	William Chirchir (KEN)	3:39.66	Michal Šneberger (CZE)	3:39.96
3000m	Rui Silva (POR)	7:55.69	Charles Bett (KEN)	7:56.04	Salvatore Vincenti (ITA)	7:56.05
5000m	Wesley Kiprotich (KEN)	14:29.14	Collins Kosgei (KEN)	14:29.17	Manuel Ángel Penas (ESP)	14:40.77
3000m Steeplechase	Collins Kosgei (KEN)	8:22.61	Wesley Kiprotich (KEN)	8:26.89	César Pérez (ESP)	8:34.94
110m Hurdles	Andrea Giaconi (ITA)	13.66	Petr Svoboda (CZE)	13.84	Yevgeniy Pechonkin (RUS)	13.91
400m Hurdles	Minás Alozídis (GRE)	49.89	Aleksandr Derevyagin (RUS)	50.21	Edivaldo Monteiro (POR)	51.16
High Jump	Yaroslav Rybakov (RUS)	2.27	Tomáš Janků (CZE)	2.23	Mustapha Raïfak (FRA)	2.21
Pole Vault	Yevgeniy Mikhaylichenko (RUS)	5.40	Javier Sebastian Gazol (ESP)	5.40	Giuseppe Gibilisco (ITA)	5.20
Long Jump	Astérios Noúsios (GRE)	7.83	Vladimir Malyavin (RUS)	7.73	Gaspar Araújo (POR)	7.58
Triple Jump	Fabrizio Donato (ITA)	17.17	Viktor Gushchinskiy (RUS)	16.57	Dmitrij Vaľukevič (SVK)	16.52
Shot Put	Ivan Yushkov (RUS)	19.80	Antonín Žalský (CZE)	19.13	Daniel Vanek (SVK)	18.77
Discus Throw	Mario Pestano (ESP)	64.67	Cristiano Andrei (ITA)	61.11	Aleksandr Borichevskiy (RUS)	60.99
Hammer throw	Vadim Khersontsev (RUS)	77.29	Lukáš Melich (CZE)	76.09	Libor Charfreitag (SVK)	75.71
Javelin throw	Aleksandr Ivanov (RUS)	81.79	Francesco Pignata (ITA)	78.10	Marián Bokor (SVK)	77.42
4 x 100m	Italy; Stefano Dacastello; Stefano Anceschi; Massimiliano Donati; Koura Fantoni Kaba	38.85	Russia; Aleksandr Volkov; Aleksey Baksheyev; Roman Smirnov; Andrey Yepishin	39.39	Spain; Cecilio Maestra; Simón Maestra; Ángel David Rodríguez; Víctor Manuel Rosas	40.31
4 x 400m	Russia; Maksim Babarykin; Dmitriy Bogdanov; Aleksandr Derevyagin; Ivan Kozhukhar	3:07.37	Spain; Salvador Rodríguez; David Canal; Daniel Ruiz; Luis Flores	3:07.55	Greece; Yeóryios Veisákis; Dimítrios Régas; Minás Alozídis; Dimítrios Grávalos	3:07.68

Women

Event	First		Second		Third	
100m	Glory Alozie (ESP)	11.27	Yeoryía Koklóni (GRE)	11.36	Marina Kislova (RUS)	11.58
200m	Yuliya Gushchina (RUS)	23.09	Kim Gevaert (BEL)	23.10	Štěpánka Klapáčová (CZE)	24.27
400m	Natalya Nazarova (RUS)	52.24	Tiffany Williams (USA)	52.81	Olesya Pogorelova (RUS)	53.83
800m	Hasna Benhassi (MAR)	2:03.86	Mariya Shapayeva (RUS)	2:03.95	Binnaz Uslu (TUR)	2:04.36
1500m	Cheruto Kiptum (KEN)	4:12.99	Olga Komyagina (RUS)	4:13.34	Wioletta Janowska (POL)	4:14.89
3000m	Elvan Abeylegesse (TUR)	8:54.03	Olga Komyagina (RUS)	8:56.58	Élodie Olivarès (FRA)	9:19.01
5000m	Elvan Abeylegesse (TUR)	15:45.06	Regina Rakhimkulova (RUS)	15:53.19	Vincenza Sicari (ITA)	16:01.34
3000m Steeplechase	Lyubov Ivanova (RUS)	9:32.83	Cheruto Kiptum (KEN)	9:38.13	Wioletta Janowska (POL)	9:54.19
100m Hurdles	Nevin Yanıt (TUR)	12.98	Glory Alozie (ESP)	13.03	Margaret Macchiut (ITA)	13.03
400m Hurdles	Yevgeniya Isakova (RUS)	54.45	Tiffany Williams (USA)	54.49	Zuzana Bergrová (CZE)	57.13
High Jump	Ruth Beitia (ESP)	1.91	Svetlana Shkolina (RUS)	1.89	Stefania Cadamuro (ITA)	1.81
Pole Vault	Jiřina Ptáčníková (CZE)	4.20	Aleksandra Kiryashova (RUS)	4.10	Adigóni Asteríou (GRE)	4.00
Long Jump	Niurka Montalvo (ESP)	6.62	Anna Nazarova (RUS)	6.42	Lucie Komrsková (CZE)	6.35
Triple Jump	Anna Pyatykh (RUS)	14.25	Anastasiya Juravlyeva (UZB)	14.02	Kéne Ndoye (SEN)	13.90
Shot Put	Olga Ryabinkina (RUS)	18.53	Filiz Kadoğan (TUR)	16.51	Martína de la Puente (ESP)	16.42
Discus Throw	Nicoleta Grasu (ROU)	61.99	Oksana Yesipchuk (RUS)	60.67	Laura Bordignon (ITA)	57.18
Hammer throw	Berta Castells (ESP)	67.66	Clarissa Claretti (ITA)	66.60	Yelena Priyma (RUS)	66.16
Javelin throw	Barbora Špotáková (CZE)	65.28	Mercedes Chilla (ESP)	57.76	Sávva Líka (GRE)	56.54
4 x 100m	Russia; Kseniya Zadorina; Tatyana Levina; Yuliya Gushchina; Marina Kislova	44.04	Spain; Cristina Sanz; Kim Gevaert; Claudia Troppa; Glory Alozie	44.08	Greece; Agní Dervéni; Athanasía Efstratiádou; Elefthéria Kobídou; Yeoryía Koklóni	45.11
4 x 400m	Russia; Kseniya Zadorina; Tatyana Levina; Yevgeniya Isakova; Natalya Nazarova	3:31.25	Greece; Aléna-María Pádi; Wioletta Frankiewicz; Eléni Filándra; Tiffany Williams	3:39.80	Czech Republic; Lenka Ostravská; Veronika Plesarová; Zuzana Bergrová; Jitka Bartoničková	3:41.54

=== Second Division (Group B) ===
Men

Event	First		Second		Third	
100m	Tim Abeyie (GBR)	10.45	İsmail Aslan (TUR)	10.69	Attila Farkas (HUN)	10.79
200m	Tim Abeyie (GBR)	20.66	Morten Jensen (DEN)	21.42	İsmail Aslan (TUR)	21.72
400m	Musa Audu (NGR)	47.13	Tuncay Örs (TUR)	47.73	Naor Greene (ISR)	48.41
800m	Chris Reynolds (GBR)	1:50.79	Youssef Baba (MAR)	1:51.35	Miloš Salaški (SCG)	1:52.65
1500m	Youssef Baba (MAR)	4:17.35	Ivan Janković (SCG)	4:18.87	Steen Walter (DEN)	4:19.68
3000m	Kemal Koyuncu (TUR)	8:06.68	Simon Plummer (GBR)	8:24.48	Jakob Hannibal (DEN)	8:29.07
5000m	Kemal Koyuncu (TUR)	14:17.96	Christian Olsen (DEN)	14:52.76	Matt Shone (GBR)	14:58.89
3000m Steeplechase	Ali Dereli (TUR)	9:07.70	Poul Grenaa (DEN)	9:17.02	Ewan Malloch (GBR)	9:26.00
110m Hurdles	Virgil Spier (NED)	13.92	Michael Illin (ISR)	14.20	Francis Smith (GBR)	14.40
400m Hurdles	Francis Smith (GBR)	51.52	Tuncay Örs (TUR)	51.77	Marius Kranendonk (NED)	52.31
High Jump	Leendert Brethouwer (NED)	2.04	Gareth Dyball (GBR)	2.04	Victor Chaletzki (ISR)	2.00
Pole Vault	Christian North (GBR)	5.30	Alex Averbukh (ISR)	5.20	Piotr Buciarski (DEN)	5.10
Long Jump	Morten Jensen (DEN)	7.55	Ferhat Çiçek (TUR)	7.17	Yochai Halevi (ISR)	6.88
Triple Jump	Tosin Oke (GBR)	16.13	Ferhat Çiçek (TUR)	14.87	Piotr Buciarski (DEN)	14.45
Shot Put	Emeka Udechuku (GBR)	18.85	Dragan Perić (SRB)	18.65	Ercüment Olgundeniz (TUR)	17.62
Discus Throw	Ercüment Olgundeniz (TUR)	61.35	Sergey Lyakhov (RUS)	58.35	Dragan Perić (SRB)	56.03
Hammer throw	Fatih Eryıldırım (TUR)	73.02	Andy Frost (GBR)	69.99	László Eperješi (SCG)	60.37
Javelin throw	Richard Knudsen (DEN)	69.78	Elliott Thijssen (NED)	68.65	Şevket Taş (TUR)	67.58
4 x 100m	Great Britain; Musa Audu; Josephus Thomas; James Wright; Tim Abeyie	40.88	Denmark; Piotr Buciarski; Nicklas Hyde; Espen Gatzwiller; Morten Jensen	41.19	Netherlands; Daniël van Leeuwen; Randy Sedoc; Jermaine Sedoc; Virgil Spier	41.29
4 x 400m	Great Britain; Adam Potter; James Wright; Chris Reynolds; Musa Audu	3:12.68	Turkey; Murat Orman; Tuncay Örs; Youssef Baba; Emrah Çoban	3:14.62	Israel; Iyad Madjoub; Andrei Issakovich; Tal Mor; Naor Greene	3:16.17

Women

Event	First		Second		Third	
100m	Saliha Özyurt (TUR)	11.66	Marion Wagner (GER)	11.72	Irina Lenskiy (ISR)	12.03
200m	Sofie Abildtrup (DEN)	24.40	Marion Wagner (GER)	24.64	Mirjam Hess (LUX)	25.13
400m	Sofie Abildtrup (DEN)	54.59	Elaine McCaffrey (IRL)	55.51	Ellen Sprunger (SUI)	55.92
800m	Rikke Rønholt (DEN)	2:06.35	Sabine Bachmann (GER)	2:09.55	Christine Long (IRL)	2:13.17
1500m	Alvilde Maria Ossum (NOR)	4:29.90	Sigrid Bühler (GER)	4:30.53	Lyndsey Freel (IRL)	4:35.60
3000m	Ana Subotić (SCG)	9:40.83	Kerstin Hoffmann (GER)	9:50.95	Maja Neuenschwander (SUI)	9:55.46
5000m	Ana Subotić (SCG)	16:45.99	Helen Hofstede (NED)	16:56.75	Maja Neuenschwander (SUI)	17:05.16
3000m Steeplechase	Helen Hofstede (NED)	10:38.45	Louise P Mørch (DEN)	10:39.73	Irina Weingarten (ISR)	11:07.06
100m Hurdles	Irina Lenskiy (ISR)	13.23	Ewa Maeder (SUI)	14.01	Maja Pisić (SCG)	14.49
400m Hurdles	Nagihan Karadere (TUR)	58.70	Olga Dogadko (ISR)	59.89	Sanne Verstegen (NED)	1:00.40
High Jump	Hafida Imam (GER)	1.75	Kathrine Nielsen (DEN)	1.73	Titia van Osch (NED)	1.71
Pole Vault	Slavica Semenjuk (SCG)	4.10	Nicole Büchler (SUI)	4.00	Anita Tørring (DEN)	3.70
Long Jump	Mona Steigauf (GER)	5.84	Milena Milašević (SCG)	5.68	Mary Devlin (IRL)	5.63
Triple Jump	Susanne Dillenberger (GER)	12.39	Daniela Miescher (SUI)	12.37	Tijana Jakovljević (SCG)	12.20
Shot Put	Monique Jansen (NED)	14.33	Marina Vojinović (SCG)	14.04	Christina Scherwin (DEN)	13.72
Discus Throw	Monique Jansen (NED)	50.38	Camille Froidevaux (SUI)	43.57	Ane Marchen Corlin (DEN)	43.34
Hammer throw	Tamara van der Bij (NED)	56.08	Meiken Greve (DEN)	53.62	Senta Kleger (SUI)	49.87
Javelin throw	Christina Scherwin (DEN)	56.62	Jelena Čudanov (SCG)	47.26	Marleen Wörsdörfer (GER)	44.23
4 x 100m	Germany; Marieterese Rosbach; Marion Wagner; Silke Wolf; Tamara Larkins	46.36	Switzerland; Lisa Wigenbröker; Michelle Cueni; Ewa Maeder; Mirjam Hess	46.78	Israel; Svetlana Gnezdilov; Irina Lenskiy; Olga Bronstein; Rotem Battat-Golan	47.12
4 x 400m	Ireland; Leigh Whiteside; Michelle Rodgers; Christine Long; Elaine McCaffrey	3:46.46	Switzerland; Anja Jost; Regina Sonderegger; Michelle Cueni; Ellen Sprunger	3:49.57	Germany; Stefanie Gubitz; Katrin Werkmann; Maral Feizbakhsh; Sabine Bachmann	3:50.22
