= 2005 European Champion Clubs Cup =

- Host city: Lagos, Portugal
- Dates: 27–28 May 2005

The 2005 European Champion Clubs Cup (ECCC) in athletics was held in Lagos, Portugal, from 27 to 28 May 2005.

== Results ==
Men's winning clubs

Games	Gold	Silver	Bronze
First Division (Group A)	Gruppi Sportivi Fiamme Gialle (POL)	SC Luch Moscow (RUS)	Sporting Clube de Portugal (POR)

Women's winning clubs

Games	Gold	Silver	Bronze
First Division (Group A)	SC Luch Moscow (RUS)	Panellinios AC (Greece)	Valencia Terra i Mar (ESP)

=== First Division (Group A) ===
Men

Event	First		Second		Third	
100m	Francis Obikwelu (POR)	10.19	Andrey Yepishin (RUS)	10.29	Panayiótis Sarrís (GRE)	10.32
200m	Francis Obikwelu (POR)	20.85	Panayiótis Sarrís (GRE)	20.97	Joseph Batangdon (CMR)	21.07
400m	Andrea Barberi (ITA)	46.32	Karel Bláha (CZE)	46.96	Oleg Mishukov (RUS)	47.11
800m	William Chirchir (KEN)	1:48.90	Timothy Kiptanui (KEN)	1:49.75	Fernando Almeida (POR)	1:50.02
1500m	Rui Silva (POR)	4:01.55	William Chirchir (KEN)	4:02.18	Timothy Kiptanui (KEN)	4:02.46
3000m	Rui Silva (POR)	8:10.67	Michal Šneberger (CZE)	8:11.08	Salvatore Vincenti (ITA)	8:11.20
5000m	Wesley Kiprotich (KEN)	14:05.64	Manuel Ángel Penas (ESP)	14:06.20	Pavel Naumov (RUS)	14:10.94
3000m Steeplechase	Wesley Kiprotich (KEN)	8:28.80	César Pérez (ESP)	8:30.98	Mário Teixeira (POR)	8:39.08
110m Hurdles	Andrea Giaconi (ITA)	13.48	Gregory Sedoc (NED)	13.72	Stanislav Sajdok (CZE)	13.80
400m Hurdles	Jiří Mužík (CZE)	51.05	Minás Alozídis (GRE)	51.17	Fabrizio Mori (ITA)	51.71
High Jump	Svatoslav Ton (CZE)	2.26	Andrea Bettinelli (ITA)	2.20	Mustapha Raïfak (FRA)	2.20
Pole Vault	Adam Ptáček (CZE)	5.50	Konstadínos Filippídis (GRE)	5.30	Joël Soler (FRA)	5.30
Long Jump	Gaspar Araújo (POR)	7.91	Štěpán Wagner (CZE)	7.85	Stefano Dacastello (ITA)	7.71
Triple Jump	Colomba Fofana (FRA)	17.21	Vitaliy Moskalenko (RUS)	16.82	Hrístos Melétoglou (GRE)	16.62
Shot Put	Andrei Mikhnevich (BLR)	20.25	Petr Stehlík (CZE)	18.76	Andréas Anastasópoulos (GRE)	18.39
Discus Throw	Cristiano Andrei (ITA)	60.33	Aleksandr Borichevskiy (RUS)	59.72	Aléxandros Ganotákis (GRE)	56.61
Hammer throw	Nicola Vizzoni (ITA)	73.79	Vítor Costa (POR)	73.44	Lukáš Melich (CZE)	73.04
Javelin throw	Aleksandr Ivanov (RUS)	77.91	Francesco Pignata (ITA)	76.78	Vitolio Tipotio (FRA)	75.47
4 x 100m	Russia; Ivan Kozhukhar; Mikhail Moskalyov; Aleksey Baksheyev; Andrey Yepishin	40.02	Italy; Stefano Anceschi; Alessandro Cavallaro; Stefano Dacastello; Koura Fantoni Kaba	40.03		

Women

Event	First		Second		Third	
100m	Ivet Lalova (BUL)	11.04	Kim Gevaert (BEL)	11.12	Tereza Košková (CZE)	11.64
200m	Kim Gevaert (BEL)	22.74	Ivet Lalova (BUL)	22.76	Yekaterina Kondratyeva (RUS)	23.48
400m	Jana Pittman (AUS)	52.37	Tatyana Levina (RUS)	52.54	Grażyna Prokopek (POL)	53.11
800m	Maria Carmo Tavares (POR)	2:03.41	Oksana Zbrozhek (RUS)	2:04.73	Esther Desviat (ESP)	2:05.54
1500m	Hind Dehiba (FRA)	4:18.01	Sandra Teixeira (POR)	4:19.82	Natalya Gorelova (RUS)	4:20.30
3000m	Elvan Abeylegesse (TUR)	8:54.00	Jeļena Prokopčuka (LAT)	9:06.95	Konstadína Efedáki (GRE)	9:08.55
5000m	Elvan Abeylegesse (TUR)	15:08.59	Jeļena Prokopčuka (LAT)	15:26.64	Inga Abitova (RUS)	15:56.67
3000m Steeplechase	Clarisse Cruz (POR)	10:02.60	Türkan Erişmiş (TUR)	10:02.79	Lyubov Ivanova (RUS)	10:15.67
100m Hurdles	Glory Alozie (ESP)	13.07	Patricia Buval (FRA)	13.23	Veronica Borsi (ITA)	13.36
400m Hurdles	Jana Pittman (AUS)	55.69	Benedetta Ceccarelli (ITA)	56.95	Alena Rücklová (CZE)	57.40
High Jump	Svetlana Shkolina (RUS)	1.89	Ruth Beitia (ESP)	1.89	Barbora Laláková (CZE)	1.83
Pole Vault	Yelena Belyakova (RUS)	4.20	Adigóni Asteríou (GRE)	4.10	Dana Cervantes (ESP)	4.00
Long Jump	Tatyana Kotova (RUS)	6.93	Panayióta Koutsioumári (GRE)	6.50	Niurka Montalvo (ESP)	6.39
Triple Jump	Carlota Castrejana (ESP)	14.42	Kéne Ndoye (SEN)	14.27	Iríni Dimitráki (GRE)	13.95
Shot Put	Nadzeya Ostapchuk (BLR)	19.57	Martína de la Puente (ESP)	17.11	Laura Bordignon (ITA)	16.75
Discus Throw	Nicoleta Grasu (ROU)	61.36	Olga Chernyavskaya (RUS)	59.05	Vladimíra Racková (CZE)	54.75
Hammer throw	Olga Kuzenkova (RUS)	68.76	Clarissa Claretti (ITA)	65.47	Dolores Pedrares (ESP)	61.62
Javelin throw	Mercedes Chilla (ESP)	59.19	Barbora Špotáková (CZE)	57.26	Sávva Líka (GRE)	55.78
4 x 100m	Greece; Yeoryía Koklóni; Effrosíni Patsoú; Athanasía Efstratiádou; Ivet Lalova-Collio	44.70	Russia; Olga Kuzemkmayeva; Tatyana Levina; Irina Anashkina; Yekaterina Kondratyeva	44.84	Spain; Carme Blay; Kim Gevaert; Cristina Sanz; Glory Alozie	45.07
4 x 400m	Russia; Oksana Gulumyan; Irina Anashkina; Kseniya Zadorina; Tatyana Levina	3:34.53	Turkey; Özge Akın; Pınar Saka; Birsen Engin; Angela Moroşanu	3:36.23	Portugal; Patrícia Lopes; Sandra Teixeira; Maria Carmo Tavares; Nataliya Pyhyda	3:37.16

=== Second Division (Group B) ===
Men

Event	First		Second		Third	
100m	Stefano Anceschi (ITA)	10.51	Attila Farkas (HUN)	10.52	Miguel Rocha (POR)	10.62
200m	Ján Gajdoš (SVK)	21.94				
400m	Roman Hollý (SVK)	48.24	Naor Greene (ISR)	48.54		
800m	Thomas Chamney (IRL)	1:50.18	Jozef Pelikán (SVK)	1:50.63		
1500m	Collins Kosgei (KEN)	4:03.41	Gezachw Yossef (ISR)	4:06.47		
3000m	Dieudonné Disi (RWA)	8:13.33				
5000m	Dieudonné Disi (RWA)	14:09.96	Issac Tanvi (ISR)	14:18.23		
3000m Steeplechase	Collins Kosgei (KEN)	8:35.93	Yizhak Cohen (ISR)	8:47.73	Eugene O'Neill (IRL)	9:05.00
110m Hurdles	Rui Palma (POR)	14.29				
400m Hurdles	Antoine Burke (IRL)	52.13				
High Jump	Peter Horák (SVK)	2.15				
Pole Vault	Alex Averbukh (ISR)	5.20				
Long Jump	Yochai Halevi (ISR)	7.65	Dmitrij Valyukevich (SVK)	7.62		
Triple Jump	Dmitrij Valyukevich (SVK)	16.52				
Shot Put	Jaroslav Pittner (SVK)	16.07				
Discus Throw	Roland Varga (HUN)	61.86	Daniel Vanek (SVK)	55.09		
Hammer throw	Jiří Koukal (SVK)	61.85				
Javelin throw	Alex Fingert (ISR)	67.11				
