= Portuguese Championship =

Portuguese Championship (Portuguese: Campeonato Português) may refer to:

- Campeonato Português de Rugby
- Portuguese Chess Championship
- Portuguese District Championships
- Portuguese Indoor Men's Athletics Championship
- Portuguese Indoor Women's Athletics Championship
- Portuguese National Badminton Championships
- Portuguese Outdoor Men's Athletics Championship
- Portuguese Outdoor Women's Athletics Championship
