= 2007 European Champion Clubs Cup =

- Host city: Albufeira, Portugal (Group A); Dubnica nad Váhom, Slovakia (Group B)
- Dates: 25-26 May 2007

The 2007 European Champion Clubs Cup (ECCC) in athletics was held in Albufeira, Portugal and Dubnica nad Váhom, Slovakia, from 25 to 26 May.

== Results ==
Men's winning clubs

Games	Gold	Silver	Bronze
First Division (Group A)			

Women's winning clubs

Games	Gold	Silver	Bronze
First Division (Group A)			

=== First Division (Group A) ===
Men

Event	First		Second		Third	
100m	Francis Obikwelu (POR)	10.23	Ángel David Rodríguez (ESP)	10.35	Andrey Yepishin (RUS)	10.38
200m	Francis Obikwelu (POR)	20.93	Ángel David Rodríguez (ESP)	21.18	Chris Lambert (GBR)	21.26
400m	Claudio Licciardello (ITA)	46.26	Peter Žňava (SVK)	47.40	Maksim Babarykin (RUS)	47.75
800m	Dmitriy Bogdanov (RUS)	1:52.29	Youssef Baba (MAR)	1:52.35	José Manuel Cortés (ESP)	1:53.25
1500m	Youssef Baba (MAR)	3:45.55	Rui Silva (POR)	3:47.08	Cosimo Caliandro (ITA)	3:47.94
3000m	Rui Silva (POR)	8:02.72	Manuel Ángel Penas (ESP)	8:03.34	Pavel Naumov (RUS)	8:04.44
5000m	Halil Akkaş (TUR)	14:05.66	Elijah Kibwalei (KEN)	14:08.12	Pablo Villalobos (ESP)	14:23.60
3000m Steeplechase	Halil Akkaş (TUR)	8:44.00	Mário Teixeira (POR)	8:45.08	Elijah Kibwalei (KEN)	8:45.93
110m Hurdles	William Sharman (GBR)	13.90	Yevgeniy Borisov (RUS)	13.90	Matúš Janeček (SVK)	14.27
400m Hurdles	Ockert Cilliers (RSA)	50.37	Edivaldo Monteiro (POR)	50.53	Luca Bortolaso (ITA)	52.04
High Jump	Vyacheslav Voronin (RUS)	2.27	Andrea Bettinelli (ITA)	2.23	Samson Oni (GBR)	2.20
Pole Vault	Artem Kuptsov (RUS)	5.50	Giuseppe Gibilisco (ITA)	5.30	Javier Sebastian Gazol (ESP)	5.20
Long Jump	Dmitrij Vaľukevič (SVK)	7.53	Vladimir Malyavin (RUS)	7.51	Gaspar Araújo (POR)	7.44
Triple Jump	Yevgeniy Plotnir (RUS)	16.96	Dmitrij Vaľukevič (SVK)	16.72	Andrés Capellán (ESP)	16.00
Shot Put	Yuriy Bilonoh (UKR)	19.68	Grigoriy Panfilov (RUS)	19.52	Manuel Martínez Gutiérrez (ESP)	18.74
Discus Throw	Aleksandr Borichevskiy (RUS)	60.96	Ercüment Olgundeniz (TUR)	59.58	Frank Casañas (CUB)	59.02
Hammer throw	Nicola Vizzoni (ITA)	78.21	Libor Charfreitag (SVK)	75.64	Vadim Khersontsev (RUS)	71.19
Javelin throw	Aleksandr Ivanov (RUS)	85.75	Francesco Pignata (ITA)	76.07	Marián Bokor (SVK)	75.19
4 x 100m	Great Britain; William Sharman; Chris Lambert; Darren Chin; Wade Bennett-Jackson	40.37	Russia; Ivan Kozhukhar; Aleksey Baksheyev; Aleksandr Volkov; Andrey Yepishin	40.40	Spain; Cecilio Maestra; Simón Maestra; Ángel David Rodríguez; Jonathan Martínez	41.10
4 x 400m	Russia; Maksim Babarykin; Ivan Kozhukhar; Aleksey Reunkov; Dmitriy Bogdanov	3:10.89	Italy; Andrea Barberi; Luca Bortolaso; Antonino Cucuzza; Claudio Licciardello	3:11.72	Spain; Luis Flores; Salvador Rodríguez; Alberto Montero; Daniel Ruiz	3:13.01

Women

Event	First		Second		Third	
100m	Josephine Onyia (ESP)	11.37	Aleksandra Fedoriva (RUS)	11.53	Daniela Graglia (ITA)	11.64
200m	Angela Moroşanu (ROU)	23.61	Glory Alozie (ESP)	24.07	Daniela Graglia (ITA)	24.10
400m	Jana Rawlinson (AUS)	51.94	Anastasiya Kapachinskaya (RUS)	53.05	Özge Gürler (TUR)	53.79
800m	Hasna Benhassi (MAR)	2:02.56	Eléni Filándra (GRE)	2:03.90	Natalya Tsyganova (RUS)	2:04.08
1500m	Vivian Cheruiyot (KEN)	4:43.82	Esther Desviat (ESP)	4:44.70	Tereza Čapková (CZE)	4:45.24
3000m	Vivian Cheruiyot (KEN)	9:06.14	Elvan Abeylegesse (TUR)	9:09.45	Vincenza Sicari (ITA)	9:14.79
5000m	Elvan Abeylegesse (TUR)	15:58.84	Rosa María Morató (ESP)	16:01.75	Vincenza Sicari (ITA)	16:03.02
3000m Steeplechase	Tatyana Petrova (RUS)	9:49.85	Marcela Lustigová (CZE)	10:05.37	Diana Martín (ESP)	10:07.29
100m Hurdles	Josephine Onyia (ESP)	12.75	Margaret Macchiut (ITA)	13.23	Esen Kızıldağ (TUR)	13.39
400m Hurdles	Jana Rawlinson (AUS)	55.52	Zuzana Hejnová (CZE)	56.37	Benedetta Ceccarelli (ITA)	56.54
High Jump	Ruth Beitia (ESP)	1.93	Svetlana Shkolina (RUS)	1.88	Barbora Laláková (CZE)	1.86
Pole Vault	Aleksandra Kiryashova (RUS)	4.35	Anna Battke (GER)	4.35	Anna Giordano Bruno (ITA)	4.20
Long Jump	Panayióta Koutsioumári (GRE)	6.21	Anastasiya Juravlyeva (UZB)	6.06	Zuzana Bičíková (CZE)	6.00
Triple Jump	Tatyana Yakovleva (RUS)	13.92	Patricia Sarrapio (ESP)	13.81	Anastasiya Juravlyeva (UZB)	13.80
Shot Put	Oksana Chibisova (RUS)	16.75	Filiz Kadoğan (TUR)	16.66	Martína de la Puente (ESP)	16.50
Discus Throw	Oksana Tuchak (RUS)	53.13	Yelena Machkanova (RUS)	52.97	Tamara Apostolico (ITA)	49.68
Hammer throw	Clarissa Claretti (ITA)	68.75	Lenka Ledvinová (CZE)	63.82	Berta Castells (ESP)	63.17
Javelin throw	Barbora Špotáková (CZE)	65.19	Mariya Abakumova (RUS)	64.28	Mercedes Chilla (ESP)	59.14
4 x 100m	Spain; Ana Torrijos; Josephine Onyia; Claudia Troppa; Glory Alozie	44.47	Russia; Natalya Nazarova; Tatyana Levina; Kseniya Zadorina; Aleksandra Fedoriva-Shpayer	44.71	Czech Republic; Zuzana Bičíková; Štěpánka Klapáčová; Kristina Bažatová; Tereza Trčková	45.71
4 x 400m	Russia; Anastasiya Kapachinskaya; Oksana Skorobogatko; Tatyana Levina; Natalya Nazarova	3:34.35	Turkey; Birsen Engin; Özge Akın; Burcu Şentürk; Angela Moroşanu	3:37.96	Spain; Cristina Alexandra Fuentes; Elena Córcoles; Margarita Fuentes-Pila; Hasna Benhassi	3:42.18

=== Second Division (Group B) ===
Men

Event	First		Second		Third	
100m	Vojtěch Šulc (CZE)	10.81	Attila Farkas (HUN)	10.83	Morten Jensen (DEN)	10.84
200m	Guus Hoogmoed (NED)	21.32	Jan Schiller (CZE)	21.67	Richard Maunier (FRA)	21.85
400m	Youness Gurachi (FRA)	46.96	Karel Bláha (CZE)	47.36	Ruben Majola (RSA)	47.71
800m	Jeff Lastennet (FRA)	1:49.81	Richard Svoboda (CZE)	1:50.42	Gezachw Yossef (ISR)	1:53.30
1500m	Jakub Holuša (CZE)	4:03.98	Abdé Zbairi (FRA)	4:04.42	Casper Dirks (NED)	4:04.69
3000m	Michal Šneberger (CZE)	8:26.11	Henrik Them Andersen (DEN)	8:29.39	Abdelkebir Mandour (MAR)	8:36.24
3000m Steeplechase	Steen Walter (DEN)	9:02.32	Jérôme Lepot (FRA)	9:06.62	František Zouhar (CZE)	9:15.10
110m Hurdles	Stanislav Sajdok (CZE)	14.00	Michael Illin (ISR)	14.02	Nenad Lončar (SRB)	14.59
400m Hurdles	Štěpán Tesařík (CZE)	52.54	Bojan Maljković (SRB)	54.73	Iyad Madjoub (ISR)	54.85
High Jump	Mustapha Raïfak (FRA)	2.19	Martijn Nuijens (NED)	2.19	Tomáš Janků (CZE)	2.16
Pole Vault	Adam Ptáček (CZE)	5.50	Joël Soler (FRA)	5.20	Yevgeniy Olkhovskiy (ISR)	5.00
Long Jump	Štěpán Wagner (CZE)	7.64	Morten Jensen (DEN)	7.48	Yochai Halevi (ISR)	7.13
Triple Jump	Colomba Fofana (FRA)	16.79	Thomas Flensborg Madsen (DEN)	15.88	Petr Hnízdil (CZE)	15.73
Shot Put	Petr Stehlík (CZE)	19.29	Asmir Kolašinac (SRB)	18.30	Kim Christensen (DEN)	18.00
Discus Throw	Gábor Máté (HUN)	62.63	Libor Malina (CZE)	55.97	Loic Fournet (FRA)	53.03
Hammer throw	Lukáš Melich (CZE)	69.48	Xavier Dallet (FRA)	65.90	Simon Corlin Jensen (DEN)	63.36
Javelin throw	Jan Syrovátko (CZE)	75.33	Lars Møller Laursen (DEN)	72.95	Vitolio Tipotio (FRA)	72.47
4 x 100m	Netherlands; Timothy Beck; Guus Hoogmoed; Daniël van Leeuwen; Dennis Tilburg	40.07	Czech Republic; Štěpán Wagner; Jan Schiller; Vojtěch Šulc; Stanislav Sajdok	41.16	France; Massire Drame; Wilfrid Fantodji Daye; Nicolas Colon; Yann Esteso	43.48
4 x 400m	France; Youness Gurachi; Desso Desacot; Gino Agnetti; Richard Maunier	3:11.29	Czech Republic; Štěpán Tesařík; Petr Svoboda; Petr Vaněk; Karel Bláha	3:14.89	Israel; Iyad Madjoub; Tamás Mezei; Ram Mor; Ruben Majola	3:21.78

Women

Event	First		Second		Third	
100m	Miriam Bobková (SVK)	12.16	Rosina Hodde (NED)	12.29	Gorana Cvijetić (BIH)	56.73
200m	Esmeralda Adriaans (NED)	25.37	Erika Kučerová (SVK)	25.84	Leigh Whiteside (IRL)	26.01
400m	Petra Groenenboom (NED)	55.71	Michelle Rodgers (IRL)	56.85	Svetlana Gnezdilov (ISR)	59.04
800m	Dalila Idir (FRA)	2:12.55	Marija Papić (SRB)	2:13.41	Regina Sonderegger (SUI)	2:13.91
1500m	Élodie Olivarès (FRA)	4:26.51	Margarita Plaksina (RUS)	4:27.14	Kerry Harty (IRL)	4:27.58
3000m	Lucia Mwihaki Kimani (KEN)	9:58.69	Anne Atia (FRA)	9:59.35	Maja Neuenschwander (SUI)	10:09.81
3000m Steeplechase	Meriem Mered (FRA)	10:20.89	Jasmina Delić (BIH)	11:37.13	Jana Styková (SVK)	11:49.48
100m Hurdles	Rahamatou Dramé (MLI)	13.49	Jelena Jotanović (SRB)	13.62	Ivana Vukomanović (SRB)	17.14
400m Hurdles	Lucia Slaníčková (SVK)	1:01.36	Liat Anav (ISR)	1:02.16	Anja Jost (SUI)	1:02.64
High Jump	Anne Gaëlle Jardin (FRA)	1.82	Diana Lázničková (SVK)	1.76	Marlies Kranendonk (NED)	1.73
Pole Vault	Nicole Büchler (SUI)	4.00	Slavica Semenjuk (SRB)	3.90	Slavomíra Sľúková (SVK)	3.80
Long Jump	Jana Velďáková (SVK)	6.64	Rotem Battat (ISR)	5.84	Mary Devlin (IRL)	5.61
Triple Jump	Dana Velďáková (SVK)	14.10	Laurie Mbotchak (FRA)	12.71	Niva Ziv (ISR)	12.38
Shot Put	Sivan Abali (ISR)	15.55	Marina Vojinović (SRB)	15.35	Jana Kárníková (CZE)	15.29
Discus Throw	Christelle Bornil (FRA)	49.85	Jana Kárníková (CZE)	46.75	Sivan Abali (ISR)	46.36
Hammer throw	Florence Ezeh (TOG)	60.90	Monika Královenská (SVK)	54.33	Rhiannon McNally (IRL)	50.45
Javelin throw	Karine Hervieu (FRA)	48.21	Marlies Kranendonk (NED)	42.23	Maja Janjic (BIH)	41.23
4 x 100m	France; Lynda Benakouche; Estelle Rousseau; Rahamatou Dramé; Laurie Mbotchak	47.28	Switzerland; Lisa Wiegenbröker; Michelle Cueni; Ellen Sprunger; Jacqueline Hadorn	47.69	Serbia; Vuckovič; Mila Andrić; Ivana Djurdjević; Jelena Subotić	48.15
4 x 400m	France; Myrnah Bloud; Sarah Rezenthel; Christelle Son; Wendy Barru	3:50.42	Switzerland; Michelle Cueni; Anja Jost; Regina Sonderegger; Lisa Wiegenbröker	3:57.89	Serbia; Mila Andrić; Ivana Djurdjević; Jelena Subotić; Ana Pavić	4:02.96
