= European Champion Clubs Cup Cross Country =

European annual cross country running competition

ECCC Cross Country
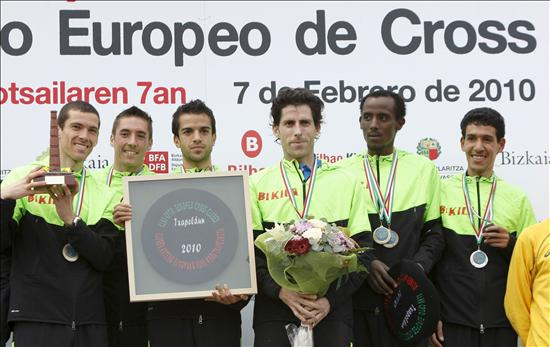
- The winning men's club, Bikila, in 2010
- Sport: Cross country running
- Founder: European Athletics Association
- First season: 1962
- Continent: Europe
- Website: ECCC Cross Country

The European Champion Clubs Cup Cross Country is an annual cross country running competition between the European running clubs that are the reigning national champions for their country. It is often abbreviated to the name ECCC Cross Country. It is traditionally held on the first Sunday of February.

Organised by the European Athletics Association, it was first held in 1962, making it the second oldest regional cross country event in the world (after the Balkan Cross Country Championships). Only the International Cross Country Championships and World Military Cross Country Championships are older than these two events. It also pre-dates the European Cross Country Championships (the international event) by over thirty years.

The competition was initially launched as a senior men only event, with a senior women's race being added to the programme twenty years later in 1982. Junior races for both men and women were initiated in 2006. Historically, the women's race was typically held at a separate location from the men's race. The two events have been held in conjunction since 2005 and each edition now features all four races (senior and junior) at the same venue. Reflecting the early roots of the tournament, until 2002 the United Kingdom sent four teams – one from each of its constituent countries. The event garners wide participation: in 2015 a total of 287 athletes competed across four races and clubs from 21 nations were present. The men's race is the most contested, with the field typically reaching 100 runners.

It is one of three annual athletics club competitions held by the European Athletics Association, alongside the European Champion Clubs Cup and European Champion Clubs Cup for Juniors in track and field.

The competition was staged in Belgium on all but one occasion up to 1980. Thereafter, it has been mostly held in the Iberian Peninsula and Italy, reflecting the prominence of the region in hosting elite level cross country meetings.

== Rules and format ==
The eligible clubs for each race differ as each needs to have qualified through the respective national level competition – for example, only national junior women's club champions compete in the junior women's race. The men's senior race is over ten kilometres (6.2 miles), the senior women's and junior men's races are over six kilometres (3.7 miles), and the junior women's race is four kilometres (2.5 miles). Each team race is scored by combining the finishing positions of a team's top four athletes. The team with the lowest cumulative score is the winner. Teams with fewer than four finishers are declared non-finishers. Medals are awarded for both the individual and team element of the competition. Non-point-scoring members of winning teams are recognised in the team ceremonies.

As a club-level competition, athletes of any nationality may compete in the competition as long as they are registered with an eligible European running club. However, athletes whose nationality is different from that of the country that their club is based in must be entered as a "Declared Foreign Athlete" in order to compete. This applies equally to non-European athletes and European athletes competing for a club of a different European nation.

The host venue for the event is decided by a host bidding process. The tournament has been held as a one-off sporting event for the host venue and also as an element to be incorporated into a long-standing cross country meeting – the annual Almond Blossom Cross Country race in Portugal has been host to the clubs cup competition on numerous occasions.

== Editions ==
=== Men ===
| Ed. | Year | City | Country | Date | Team winner | Individual winner |
|---|---|---|---|---|---|---|
| 1st | 1962 | Arlon | Belgium | 7 January | Derby and County AC (ENG) | Jean-Pierre Delloye (FRA) |
| 2nd | 1963 | Arlon | Belgium | 13 January | Derby and County AC (ENG) | Gerhard Hönicke (GDR) |
| 3rd | 1964 | Arlon | Belgium | 12 January | Union St. Gilloise (BEL) | Léon Moreels (BEL) |
| 4th | 1965 | Arlon | Belgium | 24 January | Portsmouth AC (ENG) | John Cooke (ENG) |
| 5th | 1966 | Arlon | Belgium | 23 January | Portsmouth AC (ENG) | Tim Johnston (ENG) |
| 6th | 1967 | Arlon | Belgium | 22 January | North Staffs & Stone Harriers (ENG) | Gaston Roelants (BEL) |
| 7th | 1968 | Arlon | Belgium | 19 January | ASC Darmstadt (FRG) | Lutz Philipp (FRG) |
| 8th | 1969 | Arlon | Belgium | 28 December | RFC Liège (BEL) | Lutz Philipp (FRG) |
| 9th | 1970 | Arlon | Belgium | 22 November | RFC Liège (BEL) | Lutz Philipp (FRG) |
| — | 1971 | Not held | | | | |
| 10th | 1972 | Arlon | Belgium | 16 January | RFC Liège (BEL) | Karel Lismont (BEL) |
| 11th | 1973 | Arlon | Belgium | 14 January | RFC Liège (BEL) | Norman Morrison (SCO) |
| 12th | 1974 | Arlon | Belgium | 6 January | RFC Liège (BEL) | Karel Lismont (BEL) |
| 13th | 1975 | Arlon | Belgium | 19 January | Educación y Descanso Palencia (ESP) | Mariano Haro (ESP) |
| 14th | 1976 | Messancy | Belgium | 25 January | Educación y Descanso Palencia (ESP) | Brendan Foster (ENG) |
| 15th | 1977 | Palencia | Spain | 6 February | Sporting Clube de Portugal (POR) | Carlos Lopes (POR) |
| — | 1978 | Not held | | | | |
| 16th | 1979 | Arlon | Belgium | 4 February | Sporting Clube de Portugal (POR) | Karel Lismont (BEL) |
| 17th | 1980 | Liège | Belgium | 10 February | RFC Liège (BEL) | Léon Schots (BEL) |
| 18th | 1981 | Varese | Italy | 31 January | Sporting Clube de Portugal (POR) | Fernando Mamede (POR) |
| 19th | 1982 | Clusone | Italy | 30 January | Sporting Clube de Portugal (POR) | Carlos Lopes (POR) |
| 20th | 1983 | Lyon | France | 30 January | Sporting Clube de Portugal (POR) | Fernando Mamede (POR) |
| 21st | 1984 | Albufeira | Portugal | 5 February | Sporting Clube de Portugal (POR) | Alberto Cova (ITA) |
| 22nd | 1985 | Albufeira | Portugal | 3 February | Sporting Clube de Portugal (POR) | Carlos Lopes (POR) |
| 23rd | 1986 | Albufeira | Portugal | 2 February | Sporting Clube de Portugal (POR) | Alberto Cova (ITA) |
| 24th | 1987 | Clusone | Italy | 1 February | Pro Patria Milano (ITA) | Francesco Panetta (ITA) |
| 25th | 1988 | Clusone | Italy | 6 February | Pro Patria Milano (ITA) | Francesco Panetta (ITA) |
| 26th | 1989 | Albufeira | Portugal | 5 February | Sporting Clube de Portugal (POR) | Domingos Castro (POR) |
| 27th | 1990 | Albufeira | Portugal | 4 February | Sporting Clube de Portugal (POR) | Domingos Castro (POR) |
| 28th | 1991 | Marignane | France | 10 February | Sporting Clube de Portugal (POR) | Domingos Castro (POR) Dionísio Castro (POR) |
| 29th | 1992 | Alicante | Spain | 2 February | Sporting Clube de Portugal (POR) | Domingos Castro (POR) |
| 30th | 1993 | Albufeira | Portugal | 7 February | Sporting Clube de Portugal (POR) | Domingos Castro (POR) |
| 31st | 1994 | Amorebieta | Spain | 6 February | Sporting Clube de Portugal (POR) | Domingos Castro (POR) |
| 32nd | 1995 | Albufeira | Portugal | 12 February | Maratona Clube de Portugal (POR) | Paulo Guerra (POR) |
| 33rd | 1996 | La Flèche | France | 4 February | Maratona Clube de Portugal (POR) | Paulo Guerra (POR) |
| 34th | 1997 | Cáceres | Spain | 2 February | Maratona Clube de Portugal (POR) | Paulo Guerra (POR) |
| 35th | 1998 | Vilamoura | Portugal | 8 February | Maratona Clube de Portugal (POR) | Mohammed Mourhit (BEL) |
| 36th | 1999 | Oeiras | Portugal | 31 January | Milla Int. Madrid Adidas RC (ESP) | Paulo Guerra (POR) |
| 37th | 2000 | San Sebastián | Spain | 30 February | Maratona Clube de Portugal (POR) | Eduardo Henriques (POR) |
| 38th | 2001 | Vilamoura | Portugal | 4 February | Olympique Marseille (FRA) | Serhiy Lebid (UKR) |
| 39th | 2002 | Saint-Junien | France | 3 February | Adidas RT Madrid (ESP) | Alberto García (ESP) |
| 40th | 2003 | Jaén | Spain | 2 February | CA Adidas (ESP) | Alberto García (ESP) |
| 41st | 2004 | Almeirim | Portugal | 1 February | CA Adidas (ESP) | Zersenay Tadese (ERI) |

=== Women ===
| Ed. | Year | City | Country | Date | Team winner | Individual winner |
|---|---|---|---|---|---|---|
| - | 1962-81 | Not held | | | | |
| 19th | 1982 | Formia | Italy | 31 January | Fiat Sud Lazio Formia (ITA) | Cristina Tomasini (ITA) |
| 20th | 1983 | Viterbo | Italy | 30 January | Fiat Sud Lazio Formia (ITA) | Kathy Carter (ENG) |
| 21st | 1984 | Cassino | Italy | 4 February | Cardiff AAC (WAL) | Angela Tooby (WAL) |
| 22nd | 1985 | Fuenlabrada | Spain | 3 February | Dublin City Harriers (IRL) | Angela Tooby (WAL) |
| 23rd | 1986 | Albufeira | Portugal | 2 February | Dublin City Harriers (IRL) | Angela Tooby (WAL) |
| 24th | 1987 | Clusone | Italy | 1 February | Sporting Braga (POR) | Angela Tooby (WAL) |
| 25th | 1988 | Cardiff | Wales | 7 February | Sporting Braga (POR) | Angela Tooby (WAL) |
| 26th | 1989 | Albufeira | Portugal | 5 February | Sporting Braga (POR) | Albertina Machado (POR) |
| 27th | 1990 | Braga | Portugal | 3 February | Sporting Braga (POR) | Conceição Ferreira (POR) |
| 28th | 1991 | — | San Marino | 9 February | Sporting Braga (POR) | Rosario Murcia (FRA) |
| 29th | 1992 | Cassino | Italy | 1 February | Sporting Braga (POR) | Fernanda Marques (POR) |
| 30th | 1993 | Albufeira | Portugal | 7 February | Sporting Braga (POR) | Conceição Ferreira (POR) |
| 31st | 1994 | Cassino | Italy | 6 February | Maratona Clube da Maia (POR) | Albertina Dias (POR) |
| 32nd | 1995 | Maia | Portugal | 5 February | Maratona Clube da Maia (POR) | Albertina Dias (POR) |
| 33rd | 1996 | Lanciano | Italy | 3 February | New Balance AC Vigo (ESP) | Albertina Dias (POR) |
| 34th | 1997 | Newport | Wales | 9 February | New Balance AC Vigo (ESP) | Julia Vaquero (ESP) |
| 35th | 1998 | Istanbul | Turkey | 8 February | SC Luch Moscow (RUS) | Carla Sacramento (POR) |
| 36th | 1999 | Lanciano | Italy | 7 February | SC Luch Moscow (RUS) | Mariya Pantyukhova (RUS) |
| 37th | 2000 | Salamanca | Spain | 6 February | Maratona Clube da Maia (POR) | Marina Bastos (POR) |
| 38th | 2001 | Vilamoura | Portugal | 4 February | Maratona Clube da Maia (POR) | Svetlana Baygulova (RUS) |
| 39th | 2002 | Ortuella | Spain | 3 February | Maratona Clube de Portugal (POR) | Carla Sacramento (POR) |
| 40th | 2003 | Jaén | Spain | 2 February | Maratona Clube de Portugal (POR) | Helena Sampaio (POR) |
| 41st | 2004 | Lanciano | Italy | 31 February | Maratona Clube de Portugal (POR) | Dorte Vibjerg (DEN) |

=== Combined ===
| Ed. | Year | City | Country | Date | Men's team winner | Men's individual winner | Women's team winner | Women's individual winner |
|---|---|---|---|---|---|---|---|---|
| 42nd | 2005 | Mantua | Italy | 5 Feb | CA Adidas (ESP) | Zersenay Tadese (ERI) | Maratona Clube de Portugal (POR) | Fernanda Ribeiro (POR) |
| 43rd | 2006 | Cáceres | Spain | 5 Feb | CA Adidas (ESP) | Zersenay Tadese (ERI) | Sport Club Luch Moscow (RUS) | Mariya Konovalova (RUS) |
| 44th | 2007 | Istanbul | Turkey | 4 Feb | CA Adidas (ESP) | Alberto García (ESP) | Maratona Clube de Portugal (POR) | Rosa Morató (ESP) |
| 45th | 2008 | Albufeira | Portugal | 2 Feb | CA Adidas (ESP) | Ayad Lamdassem (ESP) | CA Valencia Terra i Mar (ESP) | Mariya Konovalova (RUS) |
| 46th | 2009 | Istanbul | Turkey | 1 Feb | Maratona Clube de Portugal (POR) | Alemayehu Bezabeh (ESP) | Üsküdar Belediyespor (TUR) | Alemitu Bekele (ETH) |
| 47th | 2010 | Bilbao | Spain | 7 Feb | Atletismo Bikila (ESP) | Alemayehu Bezabeh (ESP) | Sport Club Luch Moscow (RUS) | Belaynesh Oljira (ETH) |
| 48th | 2011 | San Vittore Olona | Italy | 6 Feb | GD Conforlimpa (POR) | Ayad Lamdassem (ESP) | Üsküdar Belediyespor (TUR) | Ana Dulce Félix (POR) |
| 49th | 2012 | Castellón | Spain | 5 Feb | Atletismo Bikila (ESP) | Ayad Lamdassem (ESP) | Üsküdar Belediyespor (TUR) | Belaynesh Oljira (ETH) |
| 50th | 2013 | Castellón | Spain | 3 Feb | Atletismo Bikila (ESP) | Andrea Lalli (ITA) | Sport Club Luch Moscow (RUS) | Hiwot Ayalew (ETH) |
| 51st | 2014 | Albufeira | Portugal | 2 Feb | Atletismo Bikila (ESP) | Mohamed Moustaoui (MAR) | Sport Club Luch Moscow (RUS) | Hiwot Ayalew (ETH) |
| 52nd | 2015 | Guadalajara | Spain | 1 Feb | CA Unión Guadalajara (ESP) | Othmane El Goumri (MAR) | Üsküdar Belediyespor (TUR) | Irene Cheptai (KEN) |
| 53rd | 2016 | Kastamonu | Turkey | 7 Feb | Alès Cévennes Athlétisme (FRA) | Bekir Karayel (TUR) | Üsküdar Belediyespor (TUR) | Irene Cheptai (KEN) |
| 54th | 2017 | Albufeira | Portugal | 5 Feb | Istanbul BBSK (TUR) | Yemaneberhan Crippa (ITA) | Üsküdar Belediyespor (TUR) | Irene Cheptai (KEN) |
| 55th | 2018 | Mira | Portugal | 4 Feb | Sporting CP (POR) | Davis Kiplangat (KEN) | Sporting CP (POR) | Katarzyna Rutkowska (POL) |
| 56th | 2019 | Albufeira | Portugal | 3 Feb | Atletismo Bikila (ESP) | Jacob Kiplimo (UGA) | Sporting CP (POR) | Fancy Cherono (KEN) |
| — | 2020-2021 | Not held | | | | | | |
| 57th | 2022 | Oeiras | Portugal | 6 Feb | Ego Spor Kulübü (TUR) | Rodrigue Kwizera (BDI) | CA Playas de Castellón (ESP) | Likina Amebaw (ETH) |
| 58th | 2023 | Oropesa del Mar | Spain | 5 Feb | CA Playas de Castellón (ESP) | Rodrigue Kwizera (BDI) | CA Playas de Castellón (ESP) | Anjelina Lohalith (IOC) |
| 59th | 2024 | Albufeira | Portugal | 25 Feb | CA Playas de Castellón (ESP) | Thierry Ndikumwenayo (ESP) | SC Braga (POR) | Likina Amebaw (ETH) |
| 60th | 2025 | Albufeira | Portugal | 2 Feb | CA Playas de Castellón (ESP) | Rodrigue Kwizera (BDI) | SC Braga (POR) | Francine Niyomukunzi (BDI) |
| 61st | 2026 | Albufeira | Portugal | 8 Feb | CA Playas de Castellón (ESP) | Rodrigue Kwizera (BDI) | SC Braga (POR) | Jackline Chepkoech (KEN) |

== Junior winners ==
| # | Year | Junior men's team | Junior men's individual | Junior women's team | Junior women's individual |
|---|---|---|---|---|---|
| 1 | 2006 | Erzurum Gençlik (TUR) | Hasan Pak (TUR) | Beşiktaş (TUR) | Ancuța Bobocel (ROM) |
| 2 | 2007 | Erzurum Gençlik (TUR) | Yusuf Alici (TUR) | Dundrum South Dublin (IRL) | Charlotte Ffrench O'Carroll (IRL) |
| 3 | 2008 | Erzurum Gençlik (TUR) | Vedat Günen (TUR) | ASPTT Nancy (FRA) | Veronica Inglese (ITA) |
| 4 | 2009 | Fenerbahçe (TUR) | Nemanja Cerovac (SRB) | Sport Club Luch Moscow (25x17px) | Daniela Cunha (POR) |
| 5 | 2010 | Fenerbahçe (TUR) | Muhammet Emin Tan (TUR) | Sport Club Luch Moscow (RUS) | Esma Aydemir (TUR) |
| 6 | 2011 | Fenerbahçe (TUR) | Andrey Rusakov (RUS) | Sport Club Luch Moscow (RUS) | Esma Aydemir (TUR) |
| 7 | 2012 | S.L. Benfica (POR) | Ruben Silva (POR) | Sport Club Luch Moscow (RUS) | Vera Vasilyeva (RUS) |
| 8 | 2013 | S.L. Benfica (POR) | Erkan Celik (TUR) | Sport Club Luch Moscow (RUS) | Silvana Dias (POR) |
| 9 | 2014 | Darıca Belediyesi Eğitim SK (TUR) | Saffet Elkatmış (TUR) | Sport Club Luch Moscow (RUS) | Sarah Lahti (SWE) |
| 10 | 2015 | Darıca Belediyesi Eğitim SK (TUR) | Ramazan Karagoz (TUR) | Fenerbahçe (TUR) | Sümeyye Erol (TUR) |
| 11 | 2016 | Darıca Belediyesi Eğitim SK (TUR) | Thierry Ndikumwenayo (BDI) | Bursa Büyükşehir (TUR) | Anna Emilie Møller (DEN) |
| 12 | 2017 | CA Playas de Castellón (ESP) | Ramazan Barbaros (TUR) | Bursa Büyükşehir (TUR) | Anna Mark Helwigh (DEN) |
| 13 | 2018 | CA Playas de Castellón (ESP) | Aarón las Heras (ESP) | Fenerbahçe (TUR) | Anna Mark Helwigh (DEN) |
| 14 | 2019 | Darıca Belediyesi S.K. (TUR) | Edward Zakayo (KEN) | Fenerbahçe (TUR) | Emine Akbingöl (TUR) |
| — | 2020-21 | Not held | | | |
| 15 | 2022 | Ennis Track AC (IRL) | Dean Casey (IRL) | AC Mica Romă (ROM) | Ilona Mononen (FIN) |
| 16 | 2023 | Fenerbahçe (TUR) | Dismas Yeko (UGA) | AC Mica Romă (ROM) | Mariam Benkert (ESP) |
| 17 | 2024 | CA Playas de Castellón (ESP) | Lionel Nihimbazwe (BDI) | Fenerbahçe (TUR) | Dilek Koçak (TUR) |
| 18 | 2025 | Fenerbahçe (TUR) | Ali Tunç (TUR) | Fenerbahçe (TUR) | Hawi Abera (ETH) |
| 19 | 2026 | CA Playas de Castellón (ESP) | Frankline Kibet (KEN) | Fenerbahçe (TUR) | Sandra González (ESP) |

== Statistics ==
Most successful clubs

- Overall: Sporting Clube de Portugal, 17 titles
  - Men's: Sporting Clube de Portugal, 15 titles
  - Women's: Sporting Braga, 9 titles

== Most Successful Athletes ==
=== Men ===
| Pos. | Athletes | Victories |
|---|---|---|
| 1 | Domingos Castro (POR) | 6 |
| 2 | Paulo Guerra (POR); Rodrigue Kwizera (BDI) | 4 |
| 3 | Lutz Philipp (GER); Karel Lismont (BEL); Alberto Garcia (ESP); Zersenay Tadese (ERI); Ayad Lamdassem (ESP) | 3 |
| 9 | Fernando Mamede (POR); Alberto Cova (ITA); Francesco Panetta (ITA); Carlos Lopes (POR); Alemayehu Bezabeh (ESP) | 2 |

=== Women ===
| Pos. | Athletes | Victories |
|---|---|---|
| 1 | Angela Tooby (WAL) | 5 |
| 2 | Albertina Dias (POR); Irene Cheptai (KEN) | 3 |
| 4 | Conceição Ferreira (POR); Carla Sacramento (POR); Belaynesh Olijira (ETH); Hiwot Ayalew (ETH) | 2 |

== See also ==
- European Champion Clubs Cup (athletics)
- European Champion Clubs Cup for Juniors
