= SNIA =

SNIA or Snia may refer to:

- Storage Networking Industry Association, a trade organization focusing on computer storage
- SNIA S.p.A., a former Italian manufacturing firm
- Snia Milano, an athletics club
