= Italian Athletics Clubs Championships =

- Sport: Athletics
- Founded: 1931
- Country: Italy
- Website: Fidal.it

The Italian Athletics Championships (Italian: Campionati italiani di società di atletica leggera) are the national championships for clubs of athletics, organised by the Federazione Italiana di Atletica Leggera (FIDAL), that assign every year a scudetto from 1931 (men) and from 1939 (women).

Since 2008, military sports bodies are no longer admitted to the competition, but their athletes have the liberation to participate in a civil club.

== Champions ==
The final "A" gold of 2017 was scheduled to be held in Modena from 23 to 24 September 2017. The final A Gold of 2021 was held in Caorle on 18-19 September 2021.

=== Men ===
Year	Club	City of club	Sponsor
1931	ASSI Giglio Rosso	Florence	
1932	ASSI Giglio Rosso	Florence	
1933	ASSI Giglio Rosso	Florence	
1934	ASSI Giglio Rosso	Florence	
1935	Pro Patria	Milan	
1936	ASSI Giglio Rosso	Florence	
1937	Pro Patria	Milan	
1938	Pro Patria	Milan	
1939	Pro Patria	Milan	
1940	Pro Patria	Milan	
1941	Pro Patria	Milan	
1942	Pro Patria	Milan	
1943-45	not held		
1946	Giovinezza Trieste	Trieste	
1947	Virtus	Lucca	
1948	Giovinezza Trieste	Trieste	
1949	Ginnastica Gallaratese	Gallarate	
1950	Ginnastica Gallaratese	Gallarate	
1951	Ginnastica Gallaratese	Gallarate	
1952	Ginnastica Gallaratese	Gallarate	
1953	Ginnastica Gallaratese	Gallarate	
1954	Ginnastica Gallaratese	Gallarate	
1955	Pirelli Milano	Milan	Pirelli
1956	Fiamme Gialle	Ostia	
1957	Fiamme Oro	Padua	
1958	Fiamme Oro	Padua	
1959	Fiamme Oro	Padua	
1960	Fiamme Oro	Padua	
1961	Fiamme Oro	Padua	
1962	Sisport	Turin	Fiat
1963	CUS Roma	Rome	
1964	CUS Roma	Rome	
1965	CUS Roma	Rome	
1966	CUS Roma	Rome	
1967	Fiamme Gialle	Ostia	
1968	Fiamme Gialle	Ostia	
1969	Fiamme Gialle	Ostia	
1970	Fiamme Gialle	Ostia	
1971	Fiamme Gialle	Ostia	
1972	Atletica Rieti	Rieti	
1973	Fiamme Gialle	Ostia	
1974	Atletica Rieti	Rieti	
1975	Atletica Rieti	Rieti	
1976	Atletica Rieti	Rieti	
1977	Fiamme Gialle	Ostia	
1978	Sisport	Turin	Fiat
1979	Sisport	Turin	Fiat
1980	Sisport	Turin	Fiat

Year	Club	City of club	Sponsor
1981	Fiamme Oro	Padua	
1982	Fiamme Oro	Padua	
1983	Fiamme Oro	Padua	
1984	Fiamme Oro	Padua	
1985	Fiamme Oro	Padua	
1986	Fiamme Oro	Padua	
1987	Fiamme Oro	Padua	
1988	Fiamme Oro	Padua	
1989	Fiamme Oro	Padua	
1990	Pro Patria	Milan	AZ Pierrel
1991	Fiamme Azzurre	Rome	
1992	Fiamme Oro	Padua	
1993	Fiamme Azzurre	Rome	
1994	Fiamme Azzurre	Rome	
1995	Fiamme Oro	Padua	
1996	Fiamme Azzurre	Rome	
1997	Fiamme Gialle	Ostia	
1998	Fiamme Gialle	Ostia	
1999	Fiamme Gialle	Ostia	
2000	Fiamme Gialle	Ostia	
2001	Carabinieri	Bologna	
2002	Fiamme Gialle	Ostia	
2003	Fiamme Gialle	Ostia	
2004	Fiamme Gialle	Ostia	
2005	Fiamme Gialle	Ostia	
2006	Fiamme Gialle	Ostia	
2007	Fiamme Gialle	Ostia	
2008	Assindustria Sport Padova	Padua	
2009	Atletica Riccardi	Milan	
2010	Atletica Vomano	Morro d'Oro	Bruni Pubblicità
2011	Atletica Riccardi	Milan	
2012	Atletica Riccardi	Milan	
2013	Studentesca Rieti	Rieti	
2014	Atletica Riccardi	Milan	
2015	Atletica Riccardi	Milan	
2016	Enterprise Sport&Service	Benevento	
2017	Enterprise Sport&Service	Benevento	
2018	Studentesca Rieti	Rieti	
2019	Athletic Club 96 Alperia Bolzano	Bolzano	
2020	Athletic Club 96	Bolzano	
2021	Enterprise Sport&Service	Benevento	

== Multiwinners ==
Men

- 19 wins: Fiamme Gialle
- 12 wins: Pro Patria Milano
- 12 wins: Fiamme Oro Padova
- 6 wins: Ginnastica Gallatarese
- 5 wins: Atletica Riccardi

Women

- 15 wins: Sisport Torino
- 14 wins: ACSI Italia Atletica
- 13 wins: Snia Milano
- 9 wins: Snam Gas Metano

== See also ==
- European Champion Clubs Cup
