= European Champion Clubs' Cup (disambiguation) =

European Champion Clubs' Cup is the trophy awarded to the winners of the UEFA Champions League.

European Champion Clubs' Cup may also refer to:

- The original name of the UEFA Champions League
- European Champion Clubs Cup (athletics)
