= European Champion Clubs Cup =

European Champion Clubs Cup may refer to:

- European Champion Clubs' Cup, association football cup of European club national champions
- European Champion Clubs Cup (athletics), athletics cup of European club national champions
