= Atletica Riccardi =

Italian athletics club

- Founded: 1946
- League: Italian Athletics Federation (FIDAL)
- Based in: Milan
- Stadium: Arena Civica
- Colors: Green & White
- President: Sergio Tammaro
- Head coach: Alessandro Nocera
- Championships: Italian for clubs
- Website: www.atleticariccardi.it

The Atletica Riccardi (also known as Atletica Riccardi Milano) is an Italian athletics club based in Milan, founded in 1946.

== Achievements ==
Atletica Riccardi won five editions of the men's Italian Championships in Athletics for clubs (2009, 2011, 2012, 2014, 2015).

== Main athletes ==
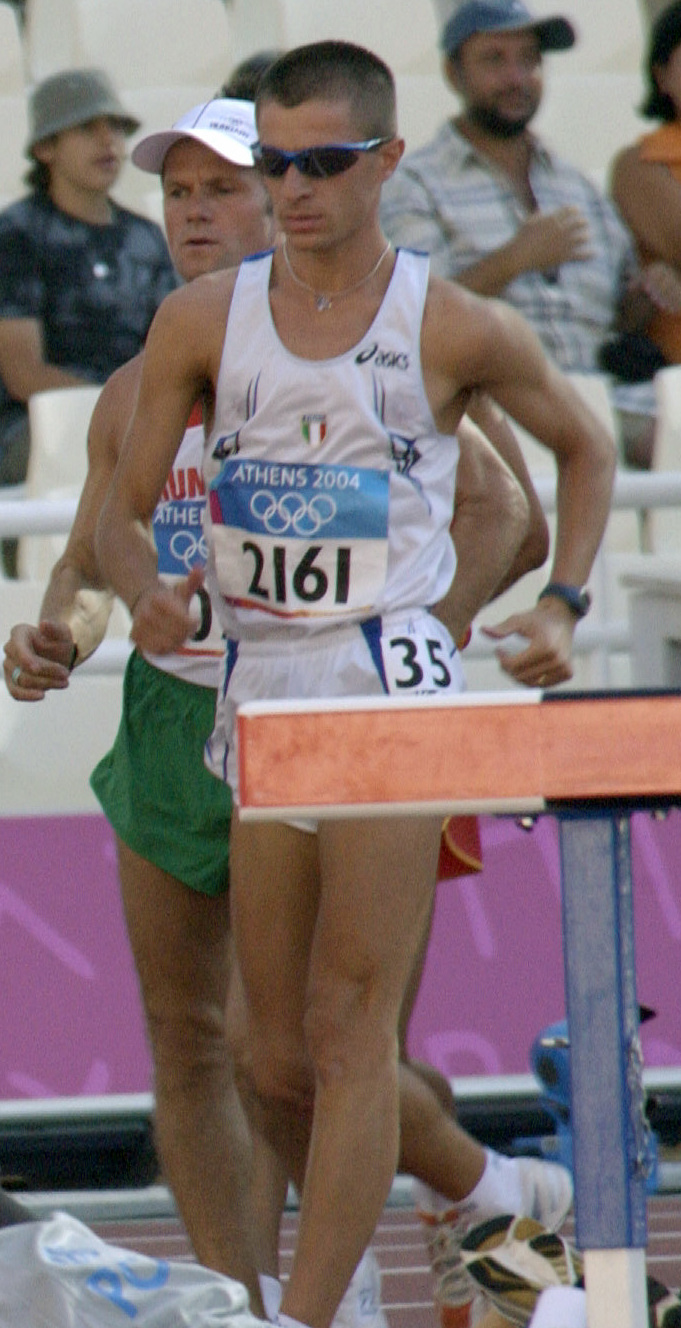
Ivano Brugnetti, Olympic champion at Athens 2004.

Below is the list of the main athletes who have been in force in the Atletica Riccardi.

Olympic champions

- Ivano Brugnetti
- Gelindo Bordin

== See also ==
- Athletics in Italy
