= Società Sportiva Metanopoli =

- Founded: 1953
- Based in: San Donato Milanese
- Website: http://www.ssmetanopoli.it

The Società Sportiva Metanopoli (previously Società Sportiva Snam also known as Snam Gas Metano) is an Italian athletics club based in Metanopoli, San Donato Milanese formed in 1953.

== Achievements ==
Snam Gas Metano won 8 editions of the women's Italian Championships in Athletics for clubs (Campionati italiani di società di atletica leggera), and one edition of the European Champion Clubs Cup.

- 8 wins at the Italian Championships (1990, 1993, 1994, 1996, 1997, 1998, 1999, 2000)
- 1 win at the European Champion Clubs Cup (1996)

== Main athletes ==
- Fiona May
- Antonella Bevilacqua
- Antonella Bizioli
- Barbara Lah
- Agnese Maffeis (38 individual wins at the national championship)
- Gennaro Di Napoli
- Loris Paoluzzi
- Stefano Tilli
- Carla Tuzzi

== See also ==
- Athletics in Italy
- Snam
