= European Champion Clubs Cup for Juniors =

The European Champion Clubs Cup is an athletics competition to the European junior athletics club that wins their national championships.

Organized by European Athletics Association, first edition was held in 1979. The 2011 held in Castellón, Spain.

== Editions ==
For the first time, in 2011, an Italian team, Audacia Atletica Record Juniors, wins the cup in Women category.

#	Year	Venue	Winner (men's)	Country	Winner (women's)	Country
1	1979	Liège	RFC Liège	Belgium	Amsterdam	Netherlands
2	1980	Liège	Birmingham	United Kingdom	Birmingham	United Kingdom
3	1981	Liège	Birmingham	United Kingdom	Bayer 04 Leverkusen	Germany
4	1982	Liège	London	United Kingdom	London	United Kingdom
5	1983	Liège	Birchfield Birmingham	United Kingdom	Birmingham	United Kingdom
6	1984	Liège	Birchfield Birmingham	United Kingdom	Did not held	
7	1985	Liège	Shaftesbury Barnet Harriers	United Kingdom	Did not held	
8	1986	London	LC Brühl	Switzerland	FC Bayer 05 Uerdingen	Germany
9	1987	Amsterdam	FC Bayer 05 Uerdingen	Germany	Did not held	
10	1988	Uerdingen	FC Bayer 05 Uerdingen	Germany	KSI Budapest	Hungary
11	1989	Aix-les-Bains	KSI Budapest	Hungary	Sale Harriers Manchester	United Kingdom
12	1990	London	Red Star Belgrade	Yugoslavia	Partizan Belgrade	Yugoslavia
13	1991	Athens	RKS Skra Warsaw	Poland	Sale Harriers Manchester	United Kingdom
14	1992	Albi	Larios Madrid	Spain	SC Berlin	Germany
15	1993	Zwijndrecht	Moscow City Sports	Russia	Gart Kyiv	Ukraine
16	1994	Warsaw	Moscow City Sports	Russia	Orlyonok Saint Petersburg	Russia
17	1995	Ostrava	Moscow City Sports	Russia	N.O. Saint Petersburg	Russia
18	1996	Mogliano Veneto	N.O. Saint Petersburg	Russia	Moscow City Sports	Russia
19	1997	Bydgoszcz	N.O. Saint Petersburg	Russia	N.O. Saint Petersburg	Russia
20	1998	Istanbul	N.O. Saint Petersburg	Russia	Moscow City Sports	Russia
21	1999	London	Zrinjevac Zagreb	Croatia	Luch Moscow	Russia
22	2000	Ljubljana	Luch Moscow	Russia	Luch Moscow	Russia
23	2001	Rennes	Luch Moscow	Russia	Luch Moscow	Russia
24	2002	Belgrade	Luch Moscow	Russia	Luch Moscow	Russia
25	2003	Koper	Luch Moscow	Russia	Luch Moscow	Russia
26	2004	Ostrava	Luch Moscow	Russia	Luch Moscow	Russia
27	2005	Belgrade	SC Moscow	Russia	Viktoriya Lipetsk	Russia
28	2006	Moscow	SC Moscow	Russia	SC Moscow	Russia
29	2007	Brno	Red Star Belgrade	Serbia	ASC Moscow	Russia
30	2008	Sremska Mitrovica	SC Moscow	Russia	SC Moscow	Russia
31	2009	Moscow	ASC Moscow	Russia	ASC Moscow	Russia
32	2010	Bydgoszcz	Playas de Castellón	Spain	Olymp Brno	Czech Republic
33	2011	Castellón	Playas de Castellón	Spain	Audacia Record Atletica	Italy
34	2012	Ljubljana / SLO	Shaftesbury Barnet Harriers	United Kingdom	Fenerbahçe	Turkey
35	2013	Brno	Fenerbahçe	Turkey	Olymp Brno	Czech Republic
36	2014	Castellón	Fenerbahçe	Turkey	Fenerbahçe	Turkey
37	2015	Istanbul	Playas de Castellón	Spain	Fenerbahçe	Turkey
38	2016	Castellón	Shaftesbury Barnet Harriers	United Kingdom	Fenerbahçe	Turkey
39	2017	Brno	Fenerbahçe	Turkey	Fenerbahçe	Turkey
40	2018	Castellón	S.L. Benfica	Portugal	Fenerbahçe	Turkey
41	2019	Leiria	Fenerbahçe	Turkey	Fenerbahçe	Turkey

== See also ==
- European Athletics Association
- European Champion Clubs Cup (athletics)
- European Champion Clubs Cup Cross Country
