= Athletics at the 2003 Summer Universiade – Men's 3000 metres steeplechase =

Steeplechase in South Korea 2003

The Men's 3000 metres steeplechase event at the 2003 Summer Universiade was held on 29 August in Daegu, South Korea.

== Results ==
Rank	Athlete	Nationality	Time	Notes
1st place, gold medalist(s)	César Pérez	Spain	8:38.52	
2nd place, silver medalist(s)	Vincent Zouaoui-Dandrieux	France	8:39.24	
3rd place, bronze medalist(s)	Andrey Olshanskiy	Russia	8:39.62	
4	Iaroslav Muşinschi	Moldova	8:40.41	
5	Ion Luchianov	Moldova	8:43.25	
6	Roman Usov	Russia	8:46.00	
7	Richard Jeremiah	Australia	8:46.36	
8	Pedro Ribeiro	Portugal	8:52.80	
9	Halil Akkaş	Turkey	8:55.90	
10	David Milne	Canada	8:58.40	
11	Eugene O'Neill	Ireland	9:00.31	
12	Kim Hogarth	New Zealand	9:04.12	
13	Panagiotis Kyprianou	Cyprus	9:30.21	
14	Kim Young-jin	South Korea	9:33.04	
