= 1994 World Junior Championships in Athletics – Men's 3000 metres steeplechase =

The men's 3000 metres steeplechase event at the 1994 World Junior Championships in Athletics was held in Lisbon, Portugal, at Estádio Universitário de Lisboa on 21 and 23 July.

== Medalists ==
Gold	Paul Chemase; Kenya
Silver	Julius Chelule; Kenya
Bronze	Irba Lakhal; Morocco

== Results ==
=== Final ===
23 July

Rank	Name	Nationality	Time	Notes
1st place, gold medalist(s)	Paul Chemase	Kenya	8:31.51	
2nd place, silver medalist(s)	Julius Chelule	Kenya	8:33.64	
3rd place, bronze medalist(s)	Irba Lakhal	Morocco	8:34.42	
4	Luciano Di Pardo	Italy	8:38.11	
5	Lemma Alemayehu	Ethiopia	8:38.66	
6	José Luis Blanco	Spain	8:39.85	
7	Christian Knoblich	Germany	8:39.99	
8	César Pérez	Spain	8:52.45	
9	Gustavo de Paula	Brazil	8:54.61	
10	Aleksey Rudenko	Russia	8:59.49	
11	Chryssovalantis Athanassiou	Greece	9:08.46	
12	Aleksey Potapov	Russia	9:12.52	

=== Heats ===
21 July

==== Heat 1 ====
Rank	Name	Nationality	Time	Notes
1	Paul Chemase	Kenya	8:56.54	Q
2	Lemma Alemayehu	Ethiopia	8:56.69	Q
3	César Pérez	Spain	8:57.68	Q
4	Aleksey Potapov	Russia	8:58.34	Q
5	Christian Knoblich	Germany	8:59.53	q
6	Toshiharu Adachi	Japan	9:04.87	
7	Oleg Chaban	Moldova	9:08.13	
8	Domenico D'Ambrosio	Italy	9:10.42	
9	José Serrano	Portugal	9:12.60	
10	Jerome Cochet	France	9:28.12	

==== Heat 2 ====
Rank	Name	Nationality	Time	Notes
1	Irba Lakhal	Morocco	8:50.88	Q
2	Julius Chelule	Kenya	8:51.18	Q
3	Gustavo de Paula	Brazil	8:55.04	Q
4	Luciano Di Pardo	Italy	8:57.45	Q
5	Aleksey Rudenko	Russia	8:58.79	q
6	José Luis Blanco	Spain	9:01.10	q
7	Chryssovalantis Athanassiou	Greece	9:03.09	q
8	Alexander Fuchs	Germany	9:03.44	
9	Jan-Erik Salo	Finland	9:11.85	
10	Christopher Elliott	United Kingdom	9:11.95	
11	Shinya Otsuka	Japan	9:16.67	

== Participation ==
According to an unofficial count, 21 athletes from 15 countries participated in the event.

- Brazil (1)
- Ethiopia (1)
- Finland (1)
- France (1)
- Germany (2)
- Greece (1)
- Italy (2)
- Japan (2)
- Kenya (2)
- Moldova (1)
- Morocco (1)
- Portugal (1)
- Russia (2)
- Spain (2)
- United Kingdom (1)
