= Portuguese Athletics Federation =

Sports governing body in Portugal

- Federação Portuguesa de Atletismo
- Sport: Athletics
- Abbreviation: FPAtletismo
- Founded: 5 de Novembro de 1921
- Affiliation: World Athletics
- Regional affiliation: EAA
- Headquarters: Linda-a-Velha, Oeiras, Portugal
- President: Domingos Castro

Official website
- fpatletismo.pt
- (Portugal)

The Portuguese Athletics Federation (Portuguese: Federação Portuguesa de Atletismo, FPAtletismo), is the governing body for the sport of athletics in Portugal.

== History ==
The Federação Portuguesa de Atletismo was founded on 5 November 1921, under the name "Federação Portuguesa de Sports Atléticos". It is headquartered in Linda-a-Velha, Oeiras. It's an independent sports governing body, of public interest, non-profit, ruled by their own code.

The Federação Portuguesa de Atletismo (FPAtletismo) organizes the Portuguese Indoor and Outdoor Athletics Championships. It has 21 regional associations, promoting and directing the practice of athletics, in men's and women's. In according with the International Association of Athletics Federations in which it is a member, it also organizes doping tests in official competitions, as outside them, so it can detect doping in athletics.

== Olympic medalists ==
Medal	Name	Games	Event
Silver	Carlos Lopes	(Canada) 1976 Montreal	Men's 10000 metres
Gold	Carlos Lopes	(United States) 1984 Los Angeles	Men's marathon
Bronze	António Leitão	(United States) 1984 Los Angeles	Men's 5000 metres
Bronze	Rosa Mota	(United States) 1984 Los Angeles	Women's marathon
Gold	Rosa Mota	(South Korea) 1988 Seoul	Women's marathon
Gold	Fernanda Ribeiro	(United States) 1996 Atlanta	Women's 10000 metres
Bronze	Fernanda Ribeiro	(Australia) 2000 Sydney	Women's 10000 metres
Silver	Francis Obikwelu	(Greece) 2004 Athens	Men's 100 metres
Bronze	Rui Silva	(Greece) 2004 Athens	Men's 1500 metres
Gold	Nelson Évora	(China) 2008 Beijing	Men's triple jump
Gold	Pedro Pichardo	(Japan) 2020 Tokyo	Men's triple jump
Silver	Patrícia Mamona	(Japan) 2020 Tokyo	Women's triple jump

== Other Competitions ==
- World Athletics Competitions
- European Athletics Championships
- European Athletics Indoor Championships
- European U23 Championships
- European Junior Championships
- European Cross Country Championships
- European Mountain Running Championships

== See also ==
- Portuguese records in athletics
- Portuguese Outdoor Men's Athletics Championship
- Portuguese Indoor Men's Athletics Championship
- Portuguese Outdoor Women's Athletics Championship
- Portuguese Indoor Women's Athletics Championship
