= S.L. Benfica (athletics) =

Portuguese athletics team

Benfica
- Full name: Sport Lisboa e Benfica
- Type: Athletics
- Founded: 2 December 1906 (119 years ago)
- Location: Lisbon, Portugal
- League(s): Portuguese Outdoor Athletics Championship, Indoor Athletics Championship, Cross Country Championship, Road Championship
- Activities: Track and field, road running, cross country running, racewalking
- Director: Ana Oliveira
- Colours: (red, white)
- Website: Club website

Sport Lisboa e Benfica (Portuguese pronunciation: [sɨˈpɔɾ liʒˈβoɐ i βɐ̃jˈfikɐ]), commonly known as Benfica, is a semi-professional athletics team based in Lisbon, Portugal. Founded in December 1906, it is the senior representative side of the athletics section of multi-sports club S.L. Benfica. They compete in men's and women's domestic and international competitions.

== Current men's roster ==
As of 27 June 2023

| Athlete | Nationality | Competition(s) |
| Diogo Antunes | (Portugal) | 100 metres, 4 × 100 metres relay |
| José Pedro Lopes | (Portugal) | 100 metres, 4 × 100 metres relay |
| André Costa | (Portugal) | 100 metres |
| Reynier Mena | (Cuba) | 100 metres, 200 metres |
| David Lima | (Portugal) | 200 metres |
| Ricardo dos Santos | (Portugal) | 200 metres, 400 metres, 4 × 100 metres relay |
| Raidel Acea | (Portugal) | 400 metres |
| Frederico Curvelo | (Portugal) | 4 × 100 metres relay |
| Diogo Mestre | (Portugal) | 400 metres hurdles |
| José Carlos Pinto | (Portugal) | 800 metres |
| Emanuel Rolim | (Portugal) | 1500 metres |
| Rui Silva | (Portugal) | 1500 metres |
| Luís Miguel Borges | (Portugal) | 3000 metres steeplechase |
| André Pereira | (Portugal) | 3000 metres steeplechase |
| Rui Pinto | (Portugal) | 5000 metres |
| Hermano Ferreira | (Portugal) | 5000 metres |
| Eduardo Mbengani | (Portugal) | 5000 metres |
| Samuel Barata | (Portugal) | 10,000 metres |
| Ricardo Ribas | (Portugal) | 5000 metres, marathon |
| Pedro Isidro | (Portugal) | 5000 m, 20 km, 50 km racewalking |
| Miguel Carvalho | (Portugal) | 5000 m, 20 km, 50 km racewalking |
| Pedro Pichardo | (Portugal) | Triple jump |
| Victor Korst | (Portugal) | High jump |
| Paulo Conceição | (Portugal) | High jump |
| Ivo Tavares | (Portugal) | High jump |
| Tsanko Arnaudov | (Portugal) | Shot put |
| Francisco Belo | (Portugal) | Shot put |
| Jorge Grave | (Portugal) | Discus throw |
| António Vital e Silva | (Portugal) | Hammer throw |
| Dário Manso | (Portugal) | Hammer throw |
| Décio Andrade | (Portugal) | Hammer throw |

== Current women's roster ==
As of 27 June 2023

| Athlete | Nationality | Competition(s) |
| Nádia Gaspar | (Portugal) | 400 metres hurdles |
| Marisa Vaz Carvalho | (Portugal) | 100 metres - relay |
| Tatiana Rosário | (Portugal) | 200 metres - relay |
| Rivinilda Mentai | (Portugal) | 200 metres, 400 metres, 4 × 100 metres relay |
| Marta Pen | (Portugal) | 800 metres, 1500 metres |
| Mara Ribeiro | (Portugal) | 5000 metres racewalking |
| Ana Dulce Félix | (Portugal) | Long-distance running |
| Vanessa Fernandes | (Portugal) | Long-distance running |
| Vera Nunes | (Portugal) | Long-distance running |

== Men's titles ==
=== Domestic competitions ===
- Portuguese Outdoor Men's Athletics Championship

Winners (36): 1939, 1940, 1942, 1944, 1949, 1951, 1953, 1954, 1955, 1967, 1980, 1982, 1983, 1984, 1986, 1989, 1990, 1991, 1992, 1993, 1994, 1996, 2011, 2012, 2013, 2014, 2015, 2016, 2017, 2018, 2019, 2020, 2021, 2022, 2023, 2024

- Portuguese Indoor Men's Athletics Championship

Winners (13): 1994, 1995, 2012, 2013, 2014, 2015, 2016, 2018, 2019, 2020, 2022, 2024, 2025

- Portuguese Cross Country Men's Championship

Winners (27): 1913, 1932, 1933, 1934, 1936, 1937, 1944, 1945, 1946, 1947, 1954, 1955, 1956, 1957, 1958, 1964, 1975, 1981, 1990, 2013, 2014, 2015, 2021, 2022, 2023, 2024, 2025

- Portuguese Cross Country Men's Mid-Race Championship

Winners (9) – record: 2013, 2014, 2015, 2016, 2017, 2018, 2020, 2022, 2023

- Portuguese Road Men's Championship

Winners (9): 1991, 2013, 2014, 2015, 2016, 2017, 2020, 2023, 2025

- Portuguese Road Men's Mile Championship

Winners (1) – record: 2023

=== European competitions ===
- European Road Champion Clubs Cup

Winners (5): 1988, 1989, 1990, 1991, 1992

- European Champion Clubs Cup for Juniors

Winners (1): 2018

- European Champion Clubs Cup Cross Country for Juniors

Winners (2): 2012, 2013

== Women's titles ==
=== Domestic competitions ===
- Portuguese Outdoor Women's Athletics Championship

Winners (14): 1977, 1978, 1982, 1983, 1984, 1985, 1986, 1988, 1989, 1990, 1991, 1992, 1993, 1994

- Portuguese Indoor Women's Athletics Championship

Winners (2): 1994, 2024

- Portuguese Cross Country Women's Championship

Winners (8): 1967, 1968, 1969, 1970, 1971, 1990, 2015, 2016

- Portuguese Road Women's Championship

Winners (4): 1990, 2014, 2015, 2016

== Mixed titles ==
=== Domestic competitions ===
- Portuguese Cross Country Mixed Relay Championship

Winners (2) – record: 2024, 2025

=== European competitions ===
- European Cross Country Mixed Relay Champion Clubs Cup

Winners (2): 2025, 2026
