= Portuguese Outdoor Women's Athletics Championship =

Athletics competition in Portugal

- Sport: Athletics
- Founded: 1944
- No. of teams: 8
- Country: Portugal
- Most recent champion: Sporting (56th title)
- Most titles: Sporting (56 titles)

The Portuguese Outdoor Women's Championship is the top division of women's team's in athletics. It is a competition organised by the Federação Portuguesa de Atletismo. The league consists of 8 teams that are selected after a playoff.

== Champions by Year ==
- 1944 : CF Belenenses
- 1945 : Sporting CP
- 1946 : Sporting CP
- 1947 : Sporting CP
- 1948 : CF Belenenses
- 1949 : CF Belenenses
- 1950 : CF Belenenses
- 1951 : CF Belenenses
- 1952 : CF Belenenses
- 1953 : CF Belenenses
- 1954 : CF Belenenses
- 1955 : CF Belenenses
- 1956 : CF Belenenses
- 1957 : CF Belenenses
- 1958 : CF Belenenses
- 1959 : Sporting CP
- 1960 : Sporting CP
- 1961 : Sporting CP
- 1962 : Sporting CP
- 1963 : Sporting CP
- 1964 : Sporting CP
- 1965 : Sporting CP
- 1966 : Sporting CP
- 1967 : Sporting CP
- 1968 : Sporting CP
- 1969 : Sporting CP
- 1970 : Sporting CP
- 1971 : Sporting CP
- 1972 : Sporting CP
- 1973 : Sporting CP
- 1974 : Sporting CP
- 1975 : Sporting CP
- 1976 : Sporting CP
- 1977 : SL Benfica
- 1978 : Sl Benfica
- 1979 : Sporting CP
- 1980 : Sporting CP
- 1981 : Sporting CP
- 1982 : SL Benfica
- 1983 : SL Benfica
- 1984 : SL Benfica
- 1985 : SL Benfica
- 1986 : SL Benfica
- 1987 : Sporting CP
- 1988 : SL Benfica
- 1989 : SL Benfica
- 1990 : SL Benfica
- 1991 : SL Benfica
- 1992 : SL Benfica
- 1993 : SL Benfica
- 1994 : SL Benfica
- 1995 : Sporting CP
- 1996 : Sporting CP
- 1997 : Sporting CP
- 1998 : Sporting CP
- 1999 : Sporting CP
- 2000 : Sporting CP
- 2001 : Sporting CP
- 2002 : Sporting CP
- 2003 : Sporting CP
- 2004 : Sporting CP
- 2005 : Sporting CP
- 2006 : Sporting CP
- 2007 : Sporting CP
- 2008 : Sporting CP
- 2009 : Sporting CP
- 2010 : FC Porto
- 2011 : Sporting CP
- 2012 : Sporting CP
- 2013 : Sporting CP
- 2014 : Sporting CP
- 2015 : Sporting CP
- 2016 : Sporting CP
- 2017 : Sporting CP
- 2018 : Sporting CP
- 2019 : Sporting CP
- 2020 : Sporting CP
- 2021 : Sporting CP
- 2022 : Sporting CP
- 2023 : Sporting CP
- 2024 : Sporting CP
- 2025 : Sporting CP
- 2026 : Sporting CP

== Performance by Club ==
Club	Titles	Years won
Sporting CP	56	1945, 1946, 1947, 1959, 1960, 1961, 1962, 1963, 1964, 1965, 1966, 1967, 1968, 1969, 1970, 1971, 1972, 1973, 1974, 1975, 1976, 1979, 1980, 1981, 1987, 1995, 1996, 1997, 1998, 1999, 2000, 2001, 2002, 2003, 2004, 2005, 2006, 2007, 2008, 2009, 2011, 2012, 2013, 2014, 2015, 2016, 2017, 2018, 2019, 2020, 2021, 2022, 2023, 2024, 2025, 2026
SL Benfica	14	1977, 1978, 1982, 1983, 1984, 1985, 1986, 1988, 1989, 1990, 1991, 1992, 1993, 1994
CF Belenenses	12	1944, 1948, 1949, 1950, 1951, 1952, 1953, 1954, 1955, 1956, 1957, 1958
FC Porto	1	2010

== Championships records ==
=== Women ===
Event	Record	Athlete/Team	Date	Place	Ref.
100 m	11.02 (+1.8 m/s) NR	Tatjana Pinto	25 July 2026	Lisbon	
Triple jump	14.55 m (+1.8 m/s)	Patrícia Mamona	27 June 2021	Maia	
Shot put	19.53 m	Auriol Dongmo Mekemnang (Note: Dongmo Mekemnan represented Cameroon until 2017, transferring her eligibility to Portugal which became active in 2020)	8 August 2020	Lisbon	

== See also ==
- Portuguese Outdoor Men's Athletics Championship
