= Portuguese Indoor Men's Athletics Championship =

- Sport: Athletics
- Founded: 1994
- No. of teams: 8
- Country: Portugal
- Most recent champion: Sporting CP (20th title)
- Most titles: Sporting CP (20 titles)

The Portuguese Indoor Men's Athletics Championship (Campeonato Nacional Masculino de Atletismo em Pista Coberta) is the top division of men's teams in athletics in Portugal. It is a competition organized by the Federação Portuguesa de Atletismo. It started with few disciplines, 60 metres, 400 metres, 1500 metres, 4 × 400 metres relay and 60 metres hurdles, plus other like high jump, long jump and shot put. A year later it had all of the indoor disciplines practiced. The league consists of 8 teams that are selected after a playoff. The current champions are Benfica, who have won 13 titles in total.

== Portuguese Indoor Men's Champions ==
- 1994 - SL Benfica
- 1995 - SL Benfica
- 1996 - Sporting CP
- 1997 - Sporting CP
- 1998 - Sporting CP
- 1999 - Sporting CP
- 2000 - Sporting CP
- 2001 - Sporting CP
- 2002 - Sporting CP
- 2003 - Sporting CP
- 2004 - Sporting CP
- 2005 - Sporting CP
- 2006 - Sporting CP
- 2007 - Sporting CP
- 2008 - Sporting CP
- 2009 - Sporting CP
- 2010 - Sporting CP
- 2011 - Sporting CP
- 2012 - SL Benfica
- 2013 - SL Benfica
- 2014 - SL Benfica
- 2015 - SL Benfica
- 2016 - SL Benfica
- 2017 - Sporting CP
- 2018 - SL Benfica
- 2019 - SL Benfica
- 2020 - SL Benfica
- 2021 - Sporting CP
- 2022 - SL Benfica
- 2023 - Sporting CP
- 2024 - SL Benfica
- 2025 - SL Benfica
- 2026 - Sporting CP

== Performance by club ==
Club	Titles	Years won
Sporting	20	1996, 1997, 1998, 1999, 2000, 2001, 2002, 2003, 2004, 2005, 2006, 2007, 2008, 2009, 2010, 2011, 2017, 2021, 2023, 2026
Benfica	13	1994, 1995, 2012, 2013, 2014, 2015, 2016, 2018, 2019, 2020, 2022, 2024, 2025

== Championships records ==
Event	Record	Athlete	Date	Place	Ref.
200 m	21.01 NR	João Coelho	27 February 2022	Pombal	
Heptathlon	5980 pts	Samuel Remédios	10–11 February 2018	Pombal	
Heptathlon	60m / Long jump / Shot put / High jump / 60m H / Pole vault / 1000m; 6.92 / 7.52 m / 13.70 m / 2.03 m / 7.98 / 5.00 m / 2:57.33				

== See also ==
- Portuguese Indoor Women's Athletics Championship
