= European Champion Clubs Cup (athletics) =

- Founded: 1975
- Region: Europe (EAA)
- Teams: 11 M / 13 W (finals)
- Current champions: Men's: Sporting Clube de Portugal (2nd title) Women's: (Spain) Diputación Valencia CA (3rd title)
- Most championships: Men's: (Russia) SC Luch Moscow (13 titles) Women's: (Russia) SC Luch Moscow (16 titles)
- Website: http://www.european-athletics.org/
- ECCC 2017

The European Champion Clubs Cup is an annual athletics competition between the European athletics clubs that are the reigning champions at national level.

The competition is organised by the European Athletics Association and was first held in 1975 as a men's only event. A separate women's competition was initiated in 1981. Due to large number of nations entering teams, a divisional format was introduced in 1988 for men and 1995 for women. Each club enters 1 athlete per individual event, except in the men's cups of 1975 and between 1977 and 1982 when 2 athletes were entered per individual event.

== Editions ==
=== Men's competitions ===
Edition	Year	City	Country	No. of clubs
1	1975	Liège	Belgium	
2	1976	Rieti	Italy	
3	1977	Wolverhampton	United Kingdom	
4	1978	Bochum	West Germany	
5	1979	Lisbon	Portugal	
6	1980	Madrid	Spain	
7	1981	Belgrade	Yugoslavia	
8	1982	Paris	France	
9	1983	Verona	Italy	
10	1984	Milan	Italy	
11	1985	London	United Kingdom	
12	1986	Lisbon	Portugal	
13	1987	Milan	Italy	
14	1988	Venice	Italy	
15	1989	Belgrade	Yugoslavia	
16	1990	Jerez de la Frontera	Spain	
17	1991	Jerez de la Frontera	Spain	
18	1992	Birmingham	United Kingdom	
19	1993	Budapest	Hungary	
20	1994	Málaga	Spain	
21	1995	Vila Real de Santo António	Portugal	
22	1996	Istanbul	Turkey	
23	1997	Moscow	Russia	
24	1998	Tivoli	Italy	

=== Women's competitions ===
Edition	Year	City	Country	No. of clubs	No. of nations
1	1981	Naples	Italy	8	
2	1982	Leverkusen	West Germany	10	
3	1983	Paris	France	12	
4	1984	Madrid	Spain	12	
5	1985	Zürich	Switzerland	14	
6	1986	Amsterdam	Netherlands	14	
7	1987	Como	Italy	18	
8	1988	Lisbon	Portugal	17	
9	1989	Zürich	Switzerland	19	
10	1990	Schwechat	Austria	22	
11	1991	L'Alfàs del Pi	Spain	18	
12	1992	San Donato	Italy	18	
13	1993	Limassol	Cyprus	20	
14	1994	Schwechat	Austria	19	
15	1995	(France) Paris (Group A) (Northern Ireland) Antrim/ (Denmark) Copenhagen (Group B)	France Northern Ireland/Denmark	8 8/12	
16	1996	(Italy) San Donato (Group A/B) Luxembourg (Group C)	Italy Luxembourg	9/8 8	
17	1997	(Spain) Valencia (Group A/B) (Finland) Oulu (Group C)	Spain Finland	7/6 10	
18	1998	(Portugal) Quarteira/Vilamoura (Group A) (Turkey) Istanbul (Group B) (Netherlands) Papendal (Group C)	Portugal Turkey Netherlands	6 8 8	

=== Mixed Competitions ===
Edition	Year	Venue	City	Country	No. of clubs	No. of nations
25	1999		(Greece) Athens (Group A/B) (Denmark) Aarhus (Group C)	Greece Denmark	8/6 9	
26	2000		(Portugal) Vila Real de Santo António (Group A) (Luxembourg) Dudelange (Group B/C)	Portugal Luxembourg	8 7 M/7 W	
27	2001		(Spain) Madrid (Group A) (Belgium) Gent (Group B)	Spain Belgium	8 8	
28	2002		(Portugal) Lisbon (Group A) (Netherlands) Amsterdam (Group B)	Portugal Netherlands	8 8	
29	2003		(Spain) Valencia (Group A) (Serbia and Montenegro) Belgrade (Group B)	Spain Serbia and Montenegro	8 8	
30	2004		(Russia) Moscow (Group A) (Slovenia) Maribor (Group B) (Belgium) Gent (Group C)	Russia Slovenia Belgium	8 7 7	
31	2005		(Portugal) Lagos (Group A)	Portugal	8	
32	2006		(Spain) Valencia (Group A) (Turkey) Istanbul (Group B)	Spain Turkey	8 7	
33	2007					
34	2008	Estádio Municipal	(Portugal) Vila Real de Santo António (Group A/B)	Portugal		
35	2009		(Spain) Castellón (Group A) (Slovakia) Dubnica nad Váhom (Group B)	Spain Slovakia	8 M/8 W 8 M/8 W	
36	2010	Estádio Municipal Wankdorf Stadium	(Portugal) Vila Real de Santo António (Group A) (Switzerland) Bern (Group B)	Portugal Switzerland		
37	2011	Estádio Municipal AC "Red Star" Stadium	(Portugal) Vila Real de Santo António (Group A) (Serbia) Belgrade (Group B)	Portugal Serbia		
38	2012	Estádio Municipal Mestský Štadión	(Portugal) Vila Real de Santo António (Group A) (Slovakia) Dubnica nad Váhom (Group B)	Portugal Slovakia		
39	2013	Estádio Municipal Mestský Štadión	(Portugal) Vila Real de Santo António (Group A) (Slovakia) Dubnica nad Váhom (Group B & C)	Portugal Slovakia		
40	2014	Estádio Municipal Olympic Stadium	(Portugal) Vila Real de Santo António (Group A) (Netherlands) Amsterdam (Group B & C)	Portugal Netherlands		
41	2015	Nevin Yanıt Athletics Complex Mestský Štadión	(Turkey) Mersin (Group A) (Slovakia) Dubnica nad Váhom (Group B & C)	Turkey Slovakia		
42	2016	Nevin Yanıt Athletics Complex Estádio Dr. Magalhães Pessoa	(Turkey) Mersin (Group A) (Portugal) Leiria (Group B)	Turkey Portugal		
43	2017*					
44	2018	Alexander Stadium Tampere Stadium	(United Kingdom) Birmingham (Group A) (Finland) Tampere (Group B)	United Kingdom Finland	10 M/10 W 7 M/8 W	12 8
45	2019	Complejo Deportivo Gaetà Huguet Tampere Stadium	(Spain) Castellón de la Plana (Group A) (Finland) Tampere (Group B)	Spain Finland	8 M/8 W 11 M/10 W	8 10
46	2020*					
47	2021*					
48	2022*					
49	2023*					
50	2024*					
51	2025*					
52	2026	Complejo Deportivo Gaetà Huguet	(Spain) Castellón de la Plana	Spain	11 M/13 W	12

- *Competition Not Held

== Winners ==
=== Men's ===
Year	1st	Points	2nd	Points	3rd	Points	Ref
1975	(West Germany) TV Wattenscheid	709.5	(Italy) Alco Rieti	682.5	Racing Club de France	636.5	
1976	(Italy) Alco Rieti	191	Racing Club de France	174	(Socialist Federal Republic of Yugoslavia) Red Star Belgrade	169.5	
1977	(West Germany) TV Wattenscheid	760.5	Racing Club de France	656	(United Kingdom) Wolverhampton & Bilston	644	
1978	(West Germany) TV Wattenscheid	720.5	(Italy) GS Fiamme Gialle Ostia	716.5	Racing Club de France	598.5	
1979	(Italy) Sisport Turin	722	(West Germany) TV Wattenscheid	679	Racing Club de France	618.5	
1980	(Italy) Sisport Turin	615	(West Germany) TV Wattenscheid	583	Racing Club de France	560	
1981	(Czechoslovakia) Dukla Prague	771	(Socialist Federal Republic of Yugoslavia) Red Star Belgrade	726	(West Germany) TV Wattenscheid	723.5	
1982	(Italy) Fiamme Oro Padua	743.5	(West Germany) TSV Bayer 04 Leverkusen	679	(United Kingdom) Wolverhampton & Bilston	641.5	
1983	(Italy) Fiamme Oro Padua	272	(Spain) FC Barcelona	212	(United Kingdom) Wolverhampton & Bilston	193.5	
1984	(Italy) Pro Patria Milano	301	(Italy) Fiamme Oro Padua	290	(Spain) FC Barcelona	256	
1985	(Italy) Pro Patria Milano	285	Racing Club de France	261	(United Kingdom) Haringey	254.5	
1986	Racing Club de France	290	(Italy) Pro Patria Freedent Milan	288	(Spain) FC Barcelona	275	
1987	Racing Club de France	363	(Italy) Pro Patria Osama	356.5	(Italy) Fiamme Oro Padua	350.5	
1988	Racing Club de France	118	(West Germany) TV Wattenscheid	116	(Italy) Pro Patria Osama	112.5	
1989	(Socialist Federal Republic of Yugoslavia) Red Star Belgrade	118	(Spain) Larios Madrid	110.5	Racing Club de France	109.5	
1990	(Spain) Larios Madrid	128	(Italy) Fiamme Oro Padua	113	Racing Club de France	108	
1991	(Spain) Larios Madrid	125	(Italy) Pro Patria Milano	119	Racing Club de France	108	
1992	(Spain) Larios Madrid	136	(United Kingdom) Haringey	100.5	Racing Club de France	99	
1993	(Italy) Fiamme Oro Padua	127.5	(Spain) Larios Madrid	110	(Bulgaria) CSKA Sofia	99	
1994	(Spain) Larios Madrid	129	(Italy) Fiamme Azzurre	116	Racing Club de France	97.5	
1995	(Spain) Larios Madrid	142	(Italy) Fiamme Azzurre	123	(Hungary) Ujpest TE Budapest	115	
1996	(Spain) Larios Madrid	132	(Italy) Fiamme Oro Padua	113	(United Kingdom) Belgrave Harriers	98	
1997	(Russia) SC Luch Moscow	160	(Spain) Larios Madrid	132	(Italy) Fiamme Azzurre	107	
1998	(Russia) SC Luch Moscow	160	(Czech Republic) Dukla Prague	108	(Italy) Fiamme Gialle Ostia	106.5	
1999	(Russia) SC Luch Moscow	125	(Italy) Fiamme Gialle Ostia	100	(Czech Republic) Dukla Prague	89	
2000	Sporting Clube de Portugal	105.5	(Russia) SC Luch Moscow	105	(Czech Republic) Dukla Prague	95	
2001	(Russia) SC Luch Moscow	137	(Italy) Fiamme Gialle Ostia	98	Sporting Clube de Portugal	95	
2002	(Russia) SC Luch Moscow	165	(Czech Republic) Dukla Prague	130	Sporting Clube de Portugal	119	
2003	(Russia) SC Luch Moscow	135	(Italy) Fiamme Gialle Ostia	115	(Czech Republic) Dukla Prague	106	
2004	(Russia) SC Luch Moscow	125.5	(Czech Republic) Dukla Prague	114.5	Sporting Clube de Portugal	104	
2005	(Italy) Fiamme Gialle Ostia	115	(Russia) SC Luch Moscow	113	Sporting Clube de Portugal	101.5	
2006	(Russia) SC Luch Moscow	126	(Italy) Fiamme Gialle Ostia	111	Sporting Clube de Portugal	93	
2007	(Russia) SC Luch Moscow		(Italy) Fiamme Gialle Ostia		(Spain) Puma Chapín Jerez		
2008	(Russia) SC Luch Moscow	98	(Spain) CA Playas de Castellón	95	(United Kingdom) Haringey	89	
2009	(Russia) SC Luch Moscow						
2010	(Russia) SC Luch Moscow						
2011	(Russia) SC Luch Moscow						
2012	(Italy) Fiamme Gialle Ostia	127	(Spain) CA Playas de Castellón	127	(Russia) SC Luch Moscow	119	
2013	(Italy) Fiamme Gialle Ostia	126	(Russia) SC Luch Moscow	122	(Spain) CA Playas de Castellón	107	
2014	(Italy) Fiamme Gialle Ostia	124.5	(Portugal) S.L. Benfica	111.5	(Spain) CA Playas de Castellón	106	
2015	(Spain) CA Playas de Castellón	117	(Turkey) Enka SK	115	(Italy) Fiamme Gialle Ostia	115	
2016	(Turkey) Enka SK	82	(Spain) CA Playas de Castellón	74	(Portugal) S.L. Benfica	64	
2017*							
2018	(Turkey) Enka SK	163.5	(Portugal) S.L. Benfica	159	(Spain) CA Playas de Castellón	148.5	
2019	(Spain) CA Playas de Castellón	122	(Turkey) Fenerbahçe	121	(Portugal) S.L. Benfica	112	
2020*							
2021*							
2022*							
2023*							
2024*							
2025*							
2026	Sporting Clube de Portugal	194	(Spain) CA Playas de Castellón	189,5	(Turkey) Enka SK	188,5	

- *Competition Not Held

=== Women's ===
Year	1st	Points	2nd	Points	3rd	Points	Ref
1981	(West Germany) TSV Bayer 04 Leverkusen	110	(United Kingdom) Stretford AC	96	(Italy) GS SNIA Milan	90	
1982	(West Germany) TSV Bayer 04 Leverkusen	145	(Italy) GS SNIA Milan	101.5	(United Kingdom) Stretford AC	100.5	
1983	(West Germany) TSV Bayer 04 Leverkusen	153	(Italy) GS SNIA Milan	144	(United Kingdom) Borough of Hounslow AC	138.5	
1984	(West Germany) TSV Bayer 04 Leverkusen	166	(Italy) Sisport Fiat Iveco	153	(United Kingdom) Borough of Hounslow AC	118.5	
1985	(West Germany) TSV Bayer 04 Leverkusen	214	(Socialist Federal Republic of Yugoslavia) Zajednica ZA	174	(France) Stade Français Paris	161	
1986	(West Germany) TSV Bayer 04 Leverkusen	197	(Italy) GS SNIA Milan	182.5	(Socialist Federal Republic of Yugoslavia) AC Slavonija	159.5	
1987	(West Germany) TSV Bayer 04 Leverkusen	233	(Italy) GS SNIA Milan	216	(United Kingdom) Essex Ladies AC	212.5	
1988	(West Germany) TSV Bayer 04 Leverkusen	211.5	(Italy) GS SNIA Milan	199	(Socialist Federal Republic of Yugoslavia) Red Star Belgrade	185	
1989	(West Germany) TSV Bayer 04 Leverkusen	237	(Socialist Federal Republic of Yugoslavia) Red Star Belgrade	222	(Italy) GS SNIA Milan	218	
1990	(East Germany) SC Neubrandenburg	309.5	(Soviet Union) Trade Union SC Moscow	283	(West Germany) TSV Bayer 04 Leverkusen	261	
1991	(France) Stade Français Paris	234	(Soviet Union) SC Moscow	228	(Spain) Club Kelme Madrid	215	
1992	(Bulgaria) Levski Sofia	224	(France) Stade Français Paris	224	(Italy) SS SNAM San Donato Milanese	208	
1993	(Italy) Sisport Turin	257.5	(Bulgaria) Levski Sofia	247	(Slovenia) IBL Olympija Ljubljana	239	
1994	(Bulgaria) Levski Sofia	232	(Italy) SS SNAM San Donato Milanese	225.5	(Russia) SC Luch Moscow	222	
1995	(Russia) Podmoskomye	86	(Bulgaria) Levski Sofia	84	(Czech Republic) Slavex Olympia Prague	80	
1996	(Italy) SS Snam San Donato Milanese	127	(Russia) SC Luch Moscow	104.5	(Bulgaria) Levski Sofia	94.5	
1997	(Russia) SC Luch Moscow	99	(Italy) SS SNAM San Donato Milanese	85	(Czech Republic) USK Prague	76	
1998	(Russia) SC Luch Moscow	101	(Italy) SS SNAM San Donato Milanese	87	(Czech Republic) PSK Olympia Prague	61	
1999	(Russia) SC Luch Moscow	140.5	(Spain) CA Valencia Terra i Mar	95.5	(Italy) SS SNAM San Donato Milanese	93	
2000	(Russia) SC Luch Moscow	131	(Italy) SS SNAM San Donato Milanese	102	(Spain) CA Valencia Terra i Mar	102	
2001	(Russia) SC Luch Moscow	131	(Spain) CA Valencia Terra i Mar	102.5	(Italy) SS SNAM San Donato Milanese	86	
2002	(Russia) SC Luch Moscow	138	(Spain) CA Valencia Terra i Mar	108	(Greece) Panellinios AC|	92.5	
2003	(Russia) SC Luch Moscow	123	(Spain) CA Valencia Terra i Mar	111	(Greece) Panellinios AC	106	
2004	(Russia) SC Luch Moscow	133	(Spain) CA Valencia Terra i Mar	98	(Greece) Panellinios AC	86	
2005	(Russia) SC Luch Moscow	125	(Greece) Panellinios AC	110	(Spain) CA Valencia Terra i Mar	108	
2006	(Russia) SC Luch Moscow	141	(Spain) CA Valencia Terra i Mar	111.5	(Italy) ACSI Italia Atletica	97.5	
2007	(Russia) SC Luch Moscow		(Spain) CA Valencia Terra i Mar				
2008	(Russia) Finpromko-UPI Yekaterinburg	119	(Czech Republic) Olymp Brno	96	(Turkey) Enka	93	
2009	(Russia) SC Luch Moscow	117	(Spain) CA Valencia Terra i Mar	91			
2010	(Russia) SC Luch Moscow						
2011	(Russia) SC Luch Moscow		(Turkey) Enka				
2012	(Russia) SC Luch Moscow	144	(Spain) CA Valencia Terra i Mar	118	(Turkey) Enka	117.5	
2013	(Russia) SC Luch Moscow	132	(Turkey) Enka	124.5	(Spain) CA Valencia Terra i Mar	116	
2014	(Spain) CA Valencia Terra i Mar	111	Sporting Clube de Portugal	98.50	(Turkey) Enka	90	
2015	(Spain) CA Valencia Terra i Mar	120	(Turkey) Fenerbahçe	97	Sporting Clube de Portugal	93	
2016	Sporting Clube de Portugal	133	(Spain) CA Valencia Terra i Mar	122	(Turkey) Fenerbahçe	116	
2017*							
2018	Sporting Clube de Portugal	166	(Turkey) Enka	164	(Spain) CA Valencia Terra i Mar	160	
2019	(Turkey) Enka	166	Sporting Clube de Portugal	127	(Spain) Diputación Valencia CA	102	
2020*							
2021*							
2022*							
2023*							
2024*							
2025*							
2026	(Spain) Diputación Valencia CA	222	Sporting Clube de Portugal	217	(Spain) CA Playas de Castellón	193	

- *Competition Not Held

== See also ==
- European Champion Clubs Cup for Juniors
- European Champion Clubs Cup Cross Country
