= Portuguese Indoor Women's Athletics Championship =

- Sport: Athletics
- Founded: 1994
- No. of teams: 8
- Country: Portugal
- Most recent champion: Sporting CP (30th title)
- Most titles: Sporting CP (30 titles)

The Portuguese Indoor Women's Championship in Athletics (Campeonto Nacional de Atletismo de Pista Coberta) is the top division of women's teams in Athletics in Portugal; it is a competition organised by the Federação Portuguesa de Atletismo. It started with few disciplines in the women's division, 200 metres, 800 metres, 3000 metres, 4 × 400 metres relay and 60 metres hurdles, plus others like triple jump, shot put and 3000 metres Racewalking. A year later it had all of the indoor disciplines practised. The league consists of 8 teams that are selected after a playoff. The current champions are Sporting, from Lisbon.

== Portuguese Indoor Women's Champions ==
- 1994 : SL Benfica
- 1995 : Sporting CP
- 1996 : Sporting CP
- 1997 : Sporting CP
- 1998 : Sporting CP
- 1999 : Sporting CP
- 2000 : Sporting CP
- 2001 : Sporting CP
- 2002 : Sporting CP
- 2003 : Sporting CP
- 2004 : Sporting CP
- 2005 : Sporting CP
- 2006 : Sporting CP
- 2007 : Sporting CP
- 2008 : Sporting CP
- 2009 : Sporting CP
- 2010 : FC Porto
- 2011 : Sporting CP
- 2012 : Sporting CP
- 2013 : Sporting CP
- 2014 : Sporting CP
- 2015 : Sporting CP
- 2016 : Sporting CP
- 2017 : Sporting CP
- 2018 : Sporting CP
- 2019 : Sporting CP
- 2020 : Sporting CP
- 2021 : Sporting CP
- 2022 : Sporting CP
- 2023 : Sporting CP
- 2024 : SL Benfica
- 2025 : Sporting CP
- 2026 : Sporting CP

== Performance by Club ==
Club	Titles	Years won
Sporting CP	30	1995, 1996, 1997, 1998, 1999, 2000, 2001, 2002, 2003, 2004, 2005, 2006, 2007, 2008, 2009, 2011, 2012, 2013, 2014, 2015, 2016, 2017, 2018, 2019, 2020, 2021, 2022, 2023, 2025, 2026
SL Benfica	2	1994, 2024
FC Porto	1	2010

== Championships records ==
Event	Record	Athlete	Date	Place	Ref.
Shot put	19.90 m NR	Auriol Dongmo Mekemnang (Note: Dongmo Mekemnan represented Cameroon until 2017, transferring her eligibility to Portugal which became active in 2020)	26 February 2022	Pombal	

== See also ==
- Portuguese Indoor Men's Athletics Championship
