= Portuguese Outdoor Men's Athletics Championship =

- Sport: Athletics
- Founded: 1939
- No. of teams: 8
- Country: Portugal
- Most recent champion: Sporting (50th title)
- Most titles: Sporting (50 titles)

The Portuguese Outdoor Men's Championship is the top division of men's team's in Athletics. It is a competition organised by the Federação Portuguesa de Atletismo. The league consists of 8 teams that are selected after a playoff.

== Champions by Year ==
- 1939: SL Benfica
- 1940: SL Benfica
- 1941: Sporting CP
- 1942: SL Benfica
- 1943: Sporting CP
- 1944: SL Benfica
- 1945: Sporting CP
- 1946: Sporting CP
- 1947: Sporting CP
- 1948: Sporting CP
- 1949: SL Benfica
- 1950: Sporting CP
- 1951: SL Benfica
- 1952: FC Porto
- 1953: SL Benfica
- 1954: SL Benfica
- 1955: SL Benfica
- 1956: Sporting CP
- 1957: Sporting CP
- 1958: Sporting CP
- 1959: Sporting CP
- 1960: Sporting CP
- 1961: Sporting CP
- 1962: Sporting CP
- 1963: Sporting CP
- 1964: Sporting CP
- 1965: Sporting CP
- 1966: Sporting CP
- 1967: SL Benfica
- 1968: Sporting CP
- 1969: Sporting CP
- 1970: Sporting CP
- 1971: Sporting CP
- 1972: Sporting CP
- 1973: Sporting CP
- 1974: Sporting CP
- 1975: Sporting CP
- 1976: Sporting CP
- 1977: Sporting CP
- 1978: Sporting CP
- 1979: Sporting CP
- 1980: SL Benfica
- 1981: Sporting CP
- 1982: SL Benfica
- 1983: SL Benfica
- 1984: SL Benfica
- 1985: Sporting CP
- 1986: SL Benfica
- 1987: Sporting CP
- 1988: Sporting CP
- 1989: SL Benfica
- 1990: Sl Benfica
- 1991: SL Benfica
- 1992: SL Benfica
- 1993: SL Benfica
- 1994: SL Benfica
- 1995: Sporting CP
- 1996: SL Benfica
- 1997: Sporting CP
- 1998: Sporting CP
- 1999: Sporting CP
- 2000: Sporting CP
- 2001: FC Porto
- 2002: Sporting CP
- 2003: Sporting CP
- 2004: Sporting CP
- 2005: Sporting CP
- 2006: Sporting PC
- 2007: Sporting CP
- 2008: Sporting CP
- 2009: Sporting CP
- 2010: Sporting CP
- 2011: SL Benfica
- 2012: SL Benfica
- 2013: SL Benfica
- 2014: SL Benfica
- 2015: SL Benfica
- 2016: SL Benfica
- 2017: SL Benfica
- 2018: SL Benfica
- 2019: SL Benfica
- 2020: SL Benfica
- 2021: SL Benfica
- 2022: SL Benfica
- 2023: SL Benfica
- 2024: SL Benfica
- 2025: Sporting CP
- 2026: Sporting CP

== Performance by club ==
Club	Titles	Years won
Sporting CP	50	1941, 1943, 1945, 1946, 1947, 1948, 1950, 1956, 1957, 1958, 1959, 1960, 1961, 1962, 1963, 1964, 1965, 1966, 1968, 1969, 1970, 1971, 1972, 1973, 1974, 1975, 1976, 1977, 1978, 1979, 1981, 1985, 1987, 1988, 1995, 1997, 1998, 1999, 2000, 2001, 2003, 2004, 2005, 2006, 2007, 2008, 2009, 2010, 2025, 2026
SL Benfica	36	1939, 1940, 1942, 1944, 1949, 1951, 1953, 1954, 1955, 1967, 1980, 1982, 1983, 1984, 1986, 1989, 1990, 1991, 1992, 1993, 1994, 1996, 2011, 2012, 2013, 2014, 2015, 2016, 2017, 2018, 2019, 2020, 2021, 2022, 2023, 2024
FC Porto	2	1952, 2001

== Championships records ==
Event	Record	Athlete	Date	Place	Ref.
Discus throw	62.01 m NR	Francisco Belo	11 June 2017	Vagos	

== See also ==
- Portuguese Outdoor Women's Athletics Championship
