= Üsküdar Belediyespor =

Multi-sports club in Turkey

- Full name: Üsküdar Belediyeesi Spor Kulübü
- Founded: 1996
- Ground: Bağlarbaşı Sports Hall, Üsküdar
- Owner(s): Municipality of Üsküdar, Istanbul
- President: Mecit Çetinkaya
- Website: http://www.uskudarbldspor.com/

Active branches of Üsküdar Belediyespor

Athletics
- Boxing: Handball
- Judo: Karate
- Taekwondo: Wrestling

Üsküdar Belediyespor (Turkish: Üsküdar Belediyesi Spor Kulübü) is a multi-sports club established 1984 in Istanbul, Turkey by the municipality of Üsküdar district (Turkish: Üsküdar Belediyesi).

Üsküdar Belediyespor's main activities are in athletics, women's handball and combat sports as boxing, handball, Judo, Karate, Taekwondo and wrestling.

== Achievements ==
Athletics (Women's)

- 2007 Turkey Cross Country champion
- 2008 Turkey Cross Country champion
- 2008 European Champion Clubs Cup Cross Country runner-up
- 2012 European Champion Clubs Cup Cross Country champion

== Notable sportspeople ==
Women athletes

- Alemitu Bekele Degfa (born 1977), European champion in 3000 m and 5000 m
- Türkan Erişmiş (born 1984), middle-distance runner in 3000 m steeplechase and cross country running
- Aslı Çakır Alptekin (born 1985), middle-distance runner in 1500 m
- Gülcan Mıngır (born 1989), middle-distance runner in 3000 m steeplechase
- Linet Masai (born 1989), long-distance runner in 10000 m
