= Jelena Subotić =

Political scientist

PhD Jelena Subotić

Academic background
- Education: University of Wisconsin-Madison
- Thesis: Hijacked Justice: Domestic Use of International Norms

Academic work
- Notable works: Yellow Star, Red Star: Holocaust Remembrance after Communism (Cornell University Press, 2019); Hijacked Justice: Dealing with the Past in the Balkans (Cornell University Press, 2009)

Jelena Subotić is a political scientist. She is Professor of Political Science at Georgia State University in Atlanta. She is known for her research on memory politics, human rights, and transitional justice. She has expertise in the politics of the Western Balkans. Her 2019 book Yellow Star, Red Star: Holocaust Remembrance after Communism won the Joseph Rothschild Prize in Nationalism and Ethnic Studies (awarded by the Association for the Study of Nationalities) and the best book award of the year by the European Politics and Society section of the American Political Science Association.

== Biography ==
She was born in 1970 and raised in Yugoslavia. She studied as an undergraduate at the London School of Economics and as a graduate student at Syracuse University. She has a PhD in Political Science from the University of Wisconsin-Madison.

== Publications ==
Subotić's research was published in the International Studies Quarterly, Journal of Peace Research, East European Politics and Societies, International Journal of Transitional Justice and other academic journals. Her 2009 book Hijacked Justice: Dealing with the Past in the Balkans was translated and published in Serbian by the Belgrade Center for Human Rights in 2010. In late 2010 Subotić provided copies of her book as a gift to the Library of Matica srpska in Novi Sad. Her 2019 book Yellow Star, Red Star: Holocaust Remembrance after Communism received both Joseph Rothschild Prize in Nationalism and Ethnic Studies and best book award of the year by the European Politics and Society section of the American Political Science Association in the first year after the publication.

=== Books ===
- Yellow Star, Red Star: Holocaust Remembrance after Communism (Cornell University Press, 2019)
- Hijacked Justice: Dealing with the Past in the Balkans (Cornell University Press, 2009)
