= Pro Patria Milano =

- Founded: 1883
- Based in: Milan
- Colors: blue
- Championships: Italian for clubs

The Pro Patria Milano (sometimes known by sponsor names Pro Patria Pierrel or Pro Patria Freedent) is an Italian athletics club based in Milan, founded in 1883.

== Achievements ==
Pro Patria Milano won 12 editions of the men's Italian Championships in Athletics for clubs (Campionati italiani di società di atletica leggera), and two edition of European Champion Clubs Cup.

- 13 wins at the Italian Championships (1935, 1937, 1938, 1939, 1940, 1941, 1942, 1983, 1984, 1985, 1987, 1990)
- 2 wins at the European Champion Clubs Cup (1984, 1985)

== Main athletes ==
- Luigi Beccali
- Giovanni Turba
- Pierfrancesco Pavoni
- Alberto Cova
- Mario Lanzi
- Carlo Simionato
- Enrico Perucconi
- Salvatore Morale
- Eddy Ottoz
- Giovanni Evangelisti

== See also ==
- Athletics in Italy
- Aurora Pro Patria 1919
