= César Pérez (athlete) =

Spanish long-distance runner

César Pérez (César Pérez Segovia; born 7 April 1975) is a Spanish long-distance runner who specializes in the 3000 m steeplechase.

He won the 2003 Summer Universiade and the 2004 Ibero-American Athletics Championship, he also finished eighth at the 2006 European Athletics Championships.

After his athletic career he became coach of Marta Domínguez. He was named 2009 Best Spanish newcomer track Coach, (RFEA), Royal Spanish Track and Field Federation.

== Achievements ==
| Year | Competition | Venue | Position | Event | Notes |
Representing Spain
| 1993 | European Junior Championships | San Sebastián, Spain | 8th | 3000 m s'chase | 9:01.16 |
| 1994 | World Junior Championships | Lisbon, Portugal | 8th | 3000 m s'chase | 8:52.45 |
| 2003 | Universiade | Daegu, South Korea | 1st | 3000 m s'chase | 8:38.52 |
| 2004 | Ibero-American Championships | Huelva, Spain | 1st | 3000 m s'chase | 8:30.83 |
| 2006 | World Indoor Championships | Moscow, Russia | 14th (h) | 3000 m | 7:58.06 |
| 2006 | European Championships | Gothenburg, Sweden | 8th | 3000 m s'chase | 8:30.40 |

== Personal bests ==
3000 Metres Indoor 7:49.43 Valencia, ESP 11 FEB 2006 2000 Metres Steeplechase 5:32.28 Barcelona, ESP 11 JUL 2003 3000 Metres Steeplechase 8:13.06 Huelva, ESP 20 JUN 2006
