= Sporting CP (athletics) =

Athletics section of the Sporting Clube de Portugal

- Full name: Sporting Clube de Portugal
- Founded: 1910
- Ground: Complexo Alvalade XXI,
- Location: Lisbon
- Track(s): Estádio Universitário de Lisboa
- League(s): Portuguese Men's Athletics League; Portuguese Women's Athletics League
- Manager: Carlos Lopes
- Colors: Green / White
- Website: AthleticsSporting

Athletics at Sporting Clube de Portugal is, along with football, a sport that has been in continuous operation since the foundation of the club, in 1906.

Athletics is the sport with the most national and international titles for the club, being the mainly responsible for Sporting CP to be the Portuguese club with the greatest representation at the Olympic Games in history. Over more than a century, the department has achieved sustained domestic dominance and considerable international success.

== History ==
Athletics was introduced shortly after the foundation of the club. The global impetus created by the establishment of the modern Olympic Games, which began in 1896, led to quick development of athletics in Portugal.

António Stromp, brother of Francisco Stromp, became the club's first Olympic athlete when he participated in the 1912 Summer Olympics, where he competed in the sprint events, achieving two third places in the 100 meters and in the 200 meters heats.

When the first women's athletics competitions were held in Portugal, in 1934, Sporting CP was also a pioneer with its active participation.

By the mid-20th century, Sporting CP had become a dominant presence in national championships, consistently producing leading athletes across multiple disciplines. Mário Moniz Pereira was the central figure in the development of the club's athletics department and, equally, of Portuguese athletics in the 20th century. A great promoter of this sport, he created a training school based on discipline, scientific training planning and close monitoring of athletes. His vision transformed the club into a national and international powerhouse, establishing a culture of high standards and excellence that marked several generations. As a coach, he was instrumental in the international projection of athletes who became National, European, World and Olympic champions. His impact was so significant that he earned the nickname 'Senhor Atletismo'.

It was precisely during the period when Mário Moniz Pereira took over as the club's coach for the first time that Sporting CP and Portugal reached their peak in athletics. In the men's sector, two athletes emerged who definitively marked this era: Carlos Lopes and Fernando Mamede.

Carlos Lopes was the first Portuguese athlete to become world champion, winning the 1977 IAAF World Cross Country Championships, and to win an Olympic Silver Medal, achieved in the 10,000 meters at the 1976 Summer Olympics. However, his greatest victory was when he became the first Portuguese to win an Olympic Gold Medal, winning the marathon at the 1984 Summer Olympics with a new Olympic Record of 2:09:21 (which was only beaten at the 2008 Summer Olympics), at the age of 37, making him the oldest athlete ever to win the Olympic Marathon. This victory had such a global impact that he, together with the then president of Sporting CP, João Rocha, visited the White House upon invitation from the former President of the United States Ronald Reagan, and appeared in New Kids on the Blecch, the fourteenth episode of the twelfth season of the American television series The Simpsons, in 2001.

Fernando Mamede became the first athlete from the club to hold a European Record and a World Record, both in the 10,000 meters. In 1981, at the Lisbon International Tournament, held at the Estádio José Alvalade, he set the European record with a time of 27:27.7 minutes and, three years later, at the 1984 Stockholm Meeting, he set a new world record with a time of 27:13.81 minutes.

In 1977, Sporting CP wins the men’s European Champion Clubs Cup Cross Country, its first athletics international title. A prominent figure of this competition is Dionísio Castro, the athlete who has won this event more times than anyone else in history, with a total of 13 titles, divided between six individual titles (1989, 1990, 1991, 1992, 1993, 1994) and seven team titles (1985, 1986, 1989, 1990, 1991, 1992, 1993).

In 2000, the men's sector won the European Champion Clubs Cup for the first time.

In the women’s sector, the order of the first international achievements was the opposite, with their first victory coming in the European Champion Clubs Cup in 2016, having won their first European Champion Clubs Cup Cross Country in 2018.

The 2018 European Cross Country Champion Cup made history for the club as the first international competition to be won by both the men’s and women’s teams in the same edition.

The continued dominance in athletics allows Sporting CP to be the Portuguese club with the most national and international titles.

Established in 2011, the club organizes its annual running race, named Corrida Sporting

In 2022, in collaboration with the Lisbon Athletic Association, the club created the Prof. Mário Moniz Pereira Meeting, held on a short track. It began at the Lisbon University Stadium, but, since 2025, it has been held at Expocentro, an indoor track in Pombal, consolidating itself as the 4th stage of the Portuguese Circuit of Meetings, with category Challenger of the World Athletics Continental Tour, attracting international athletes

== Honours ==
=== Domestic Competitions ===
- Portuguese Outdoor Athletics Championship: 62

*1923, *1925, *1926, *1927, *1928, *1929, *1930, *1931, *1932, *1935, *1936, *1937, 1941, 1943, 1945, 1946, 1947, 1948, 1950, 1956, 1957, 1958, 1959, 1960, 1961, 1962, 1963, 1964, 1965, 1966, 1968, 1969, 1970, 1971, 1972, 1973, 1974, 1975, 1976, 1977, 1978, 1979, 1981, 1985, 1987, 1988, 1995, 1997, 1998, 1999, 2000, 2002, 2003, 2004, 2005, 2006, 2007, 2008, 2009, 2010, 2025, 2026

* Notes: Campeonato de Portugal

- Portuguese Indoor Athletics Championship: 20

1996, 1997, 1998, 1999, 2000, 2001, 2002, 2003, 2004, 2005, 2006, 2007, 2008, 2009, 2010, 2011, 2017, 2021, 2023, 2026

- Portuguese Cross Country Championship: 49

1912, 1928, 1930, 1931, 1935, 1941, 1942, 1943, 1948, 1949, 1950, 1952, 1959, 1960, 1961, 1962, 1963, 1965, 1966, 1967, 1968, 1969, 1970, 1971, 1972, 1973, 1974, 1976, 1977, 1978, 1979, 1980, 1982, 1983, 1984, 1985, 1986, 1987, 1988, 1989, 1991, 1993, 1995, 1997, 2016, 2017, 2018, 2019, 2021

- Portuguese Short Course Cross Country Championship: 8

2000, 2001, 2002, 2003, 2009, 2010, 2011, 2012

- Portuguese Road Running Championships: 7

1990, 2018, 2019, 2021, 2022, 2023, 2026

- Portuguese Athletics Cup: 5

1997, 1998, 1999, 2000, 2003

- Portuguese Race Walking Championship 15KM: 1

2024

- Portuguese Race Walking Championship 20KM: 1

2021

=== International Competitions ===
- European Champion Clubs Cup: 2

2000, 2026

- Iberian Cup: 1

2021

- European Champion Clubs Cup Cross Country: 15

1977, 1979, 1981, 1982, 1983, 1984, 1985, 1986, 1989, 1990, 1991, 1992, 1993, 1994, 2018

=== Domestic Competitions ===
- Portuguese Outdoor Athletics Championship: 57

*1941, 1945, 1946, 1947, 1959, 1960, 1961, 1962, 1963, 1964, 1965, 1966, 1967, 1968, 1969, 1970, 1971, 1972, 1973, 1974, 1975, 1976, 1979, 1980, 1981, 1987, 1995, 1996, 1997, 1998, 1999, 2000, 2001, 2002, 2003, 2004, 2005, 2006, 2007, 2008, 2009, 2011, 2012, 2013, 2014, 2015, 2016, 2017, 2018, 2019, 2020, 2021, 2022, 2023, 2024, 2025, 2026

* Notes: Campeonato de Portugal

- Portuguese Indoor Athletics Championship: 30

1995, 1996, 1997, 1998, 1999, 2000, 2001, 2002, 2003, 2004, 2005, 2006, 2007, 2008, 2009, 2011, 2012, 2013, 2014, 2015, 2016, 2017, 2018, 2019, 2020, 2021, 2022, 2023, 2025, 2026

- Portuguese Cross Country Championship: 9

1972, 1973, 1974, 2014, 2017, 2018, 2019, *2021 (March), 2021 (November)

* Notes: 2020 Event Replacement/Canceled due to Covid-19 Pandemic

- Portuguese Short Course Cross Country Championship: 7

2000, 2012, 2013, 2014, 2015, 2016, 2017

- Portuguese Road Running Championships: 7

2017, 2018, 2019, 2020, 2021, 2022, 2023

- Portuguese Athletics Cup: 6

1996, 1997, 1998, 1999, 2000, 2022

=== International Competitions ===
- European Champion Clubs Cup: 2

2016, 2018

- Iberian Cup: 1

2021

- European Champion Clubs Cup Cross Country: 2

2018, 2019

=== Domestic Competitions ===
- Portuguese Cross Country Championship: 1

2023

- Portuguese Athletics Cup: 2

2025, 2026

== Technical staff ==
Name	Nat.	Job
Carlos Lopes	(Portugal)	Manager
Abreu Matos	(Portugal)	Coordinator
Anabela Leite	(Portugal)	Coach and Youth Academy Director
Nuno Alpiarça	(Portugal)	Coach
Armando Aldegalega	(Portugal)	Coach
Prof. Bernardo Manuel	(Portugal)	Coach
José Fonseca	(Portugal)	Coach
Luís Herédio Costa	(Portugal)	Coach

== Individual International records ==
Records achieved as Sporting CP athletes

European Records

- (Portugal) Fernando Mamede – 10,000 meters: 27:27.7 (30 May 1981, Lisbon, Estádio José Alvalade)
- (Portugal) Carlos Lopes – 10,000 meters: 27:34.29 (26 June 1982, Oslo)
- (Portugal) Fernando Mamede – 10,000 meters: 27:22.25 (9 July 1982, Paris)
- (Portugal) Francis Obikwelu – 100 meters: 9.86 (22 August 2004, Athens)

World Records

- (Portugal) Fernando Mamede – 10,000 meters: 27:13,81 (2 July 1984, Stockholm)
- (Portugal) Carlos Lopes – Marathon: 2:07:12 (20 April 1985, Rotterdam)
- (Portugal) Dionísio Castro – 20,000 meters: 57:18.4 (31 March 1990, La Flèche)

Olympic Records

- (Portugal) Carlos Lopes – Marathon: 2:09:21 (12 August 1984, Los Angeles)
