= CSAIN Snia Milano =

Italian athletics club

- Based in: Milan
- Colors: blue-yellow
- Championships: Italian for clubs

The CSAIN Snia Milano (previously simply Snia Milano) is an Italian athletics club based in Milan, via Fatebenefratelli nº4.

== Achievements ==
Snia Milano won 13 editions of the women's Italian Championships in Athletics for clubs (Campionati italiani di società di atletica leggera).

- 13 wins (1974, 1976, 1978, 1979, 1980, 1981, 1982, 1985, 1986, 1987, 1988, 1989, 1991)

== Main athletes ==
Some of the most representative athletes in the history of SNIA Milan were the following.

Men

- Ennio Preatoni
- Sergio Bello
- Dario Badinelli
- Giampaolo Urlando

Women

- Paola Pigni
- Antonella Capriotti
- Rita Bottiglieri
- Patrizia Lombardo
- Marisa Masullo
- Rossella Tarolo
- Daniela Ferrian
- Laura Fogli

== See also ==
- Athletics in Italy
- SNIA S.p.A.
