= Cristiano Andrei =

Italian discus thrower

Personal information
- National team: Italy: 12 caps (1997-2006)
- Born: 14 May 1973 (age 53) Florence, Italy
- Height: 1.98 m (6 ft 6 in)
- Weight: 112 kg (247 lb)

Sport
- Sport: Athletics
- Event: Discus throw
- Club: C.S. Carabinieri
- Retired: 2009

Achievements and titles
- Personal best: Discus throw: 64.49 m (2003)

Cristiano Andrei (born 14 May 1973) is a former Italian discus thrower.

His personal bests, 64.49 m set in 2003, at the end of the 2020 outdoor season is still the 8th best all-time performance of the Italian lists and in that year it was also the 22nd best result in the world top-lists.

== Personal life ==
Nephew of the Olympic shot put champion in Los Angeles 1984, Alessandro Andrei, in 2005 he married the former hammer thrower Ester Balassini.

== National titles ==
Andrei won five national championships at individual senior level.

- Italian Athletics Championships
  - Discus throw: 2002, 2003 (2)
- Italian Winter Throwing Championships
  - Discus throw: 2001, 2005, 2006 (3)

== See also ==
- Italian all-time top lists - Discus throw
