= Michelle Cueni =

Swiss sprinter (born 1983)

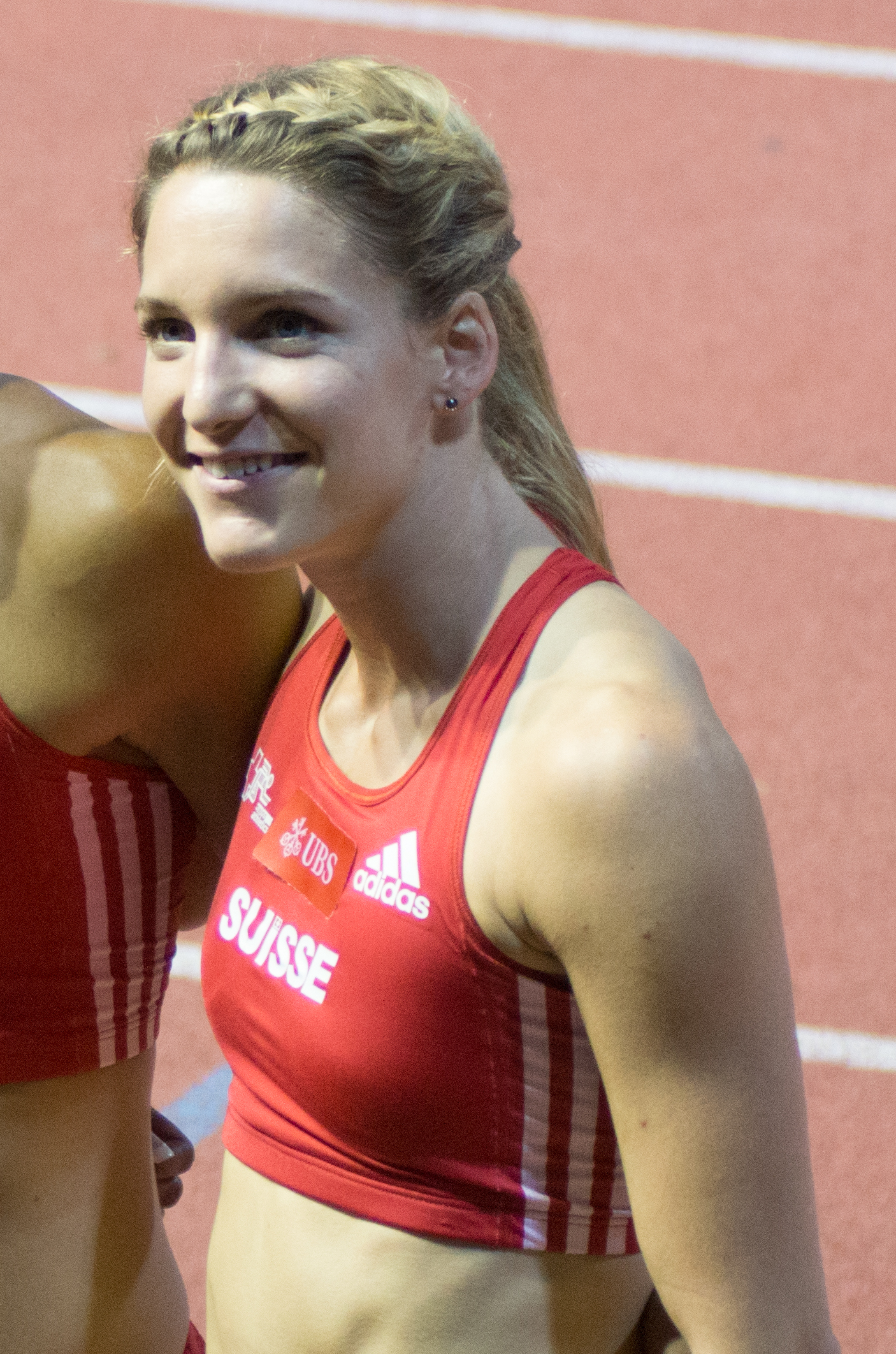
Michelle Cueni at Athletissima 2012

Michelle Cueni (born 4 December 1983 in Bern) is a Swiss sprinter. She competed for the Swiss team in the 4 × 100 metres relay at the 2012 Summer Olympics; the team placed 13th with a time of 43.54 in Round 1 and did not qualify for the final.
