= Wesley Kiprotich =

Kenyan middle-distance runner

Wesley Kiprotich (born 1 August 1979 in Kericho) is a Kenyan middle-distance runner who specialises in the 3000 metres steeplechase.

He is based at the PACE Sports Management training camp in Kaptagat.

== Achievements ==
Year	Tournament	Venue	Result	Extra
2004	World Athletics Final	Monte Carlo, Monaco	11th	3000 m st.
2005	World Athletics Final	Monte Carlo, Monaco	4th	3000 m st.
2006	Commonwealth Games	Melbourne, Australia	2nd	3000 m st.
	World Athletics Final	Stuttgart, Germany	9th	3000 m st.

=== Personal bests ===
- 1500 metres - 3:43.37 min (2005)
- 3000 metres steeplechase - 8:05.68 min (2004)
