= Yochai Halevi =

Israeli athletics competitor

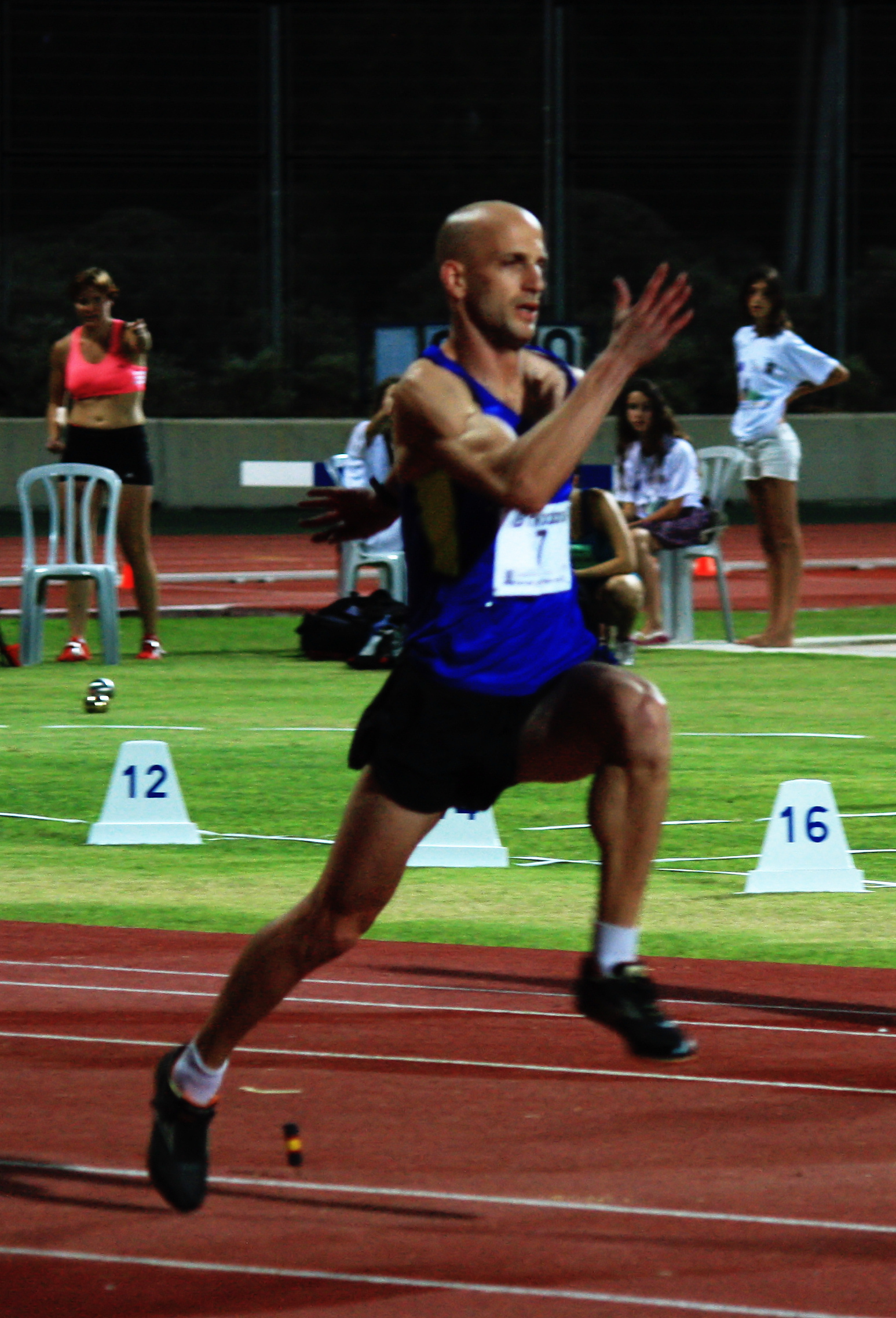
Yochai Halevi. Rishon LeZion Athletics Stadium, July 2013.

Yochai Halevi (Hebrew: יוחאי הלוי; born 10 May 1982) is an Israeli long jumper and triple jumper.

Halevi is Jewish. He competed at the 2009 World Championships without reaching the final. His personal best long jump is 7.99 metres, achieved in May 2010 in Tel Aviv. His personal best triple jump is 16.81 metres, achieved in July 2011 in Tel Aviv.

== Competition record ==
Year	Competition	Venue	Position	Event	Notes
Representing Israel
2007	Universiade	Bangkok, Thailand	21st (q)	Long jump	7.51 m
2009	Maccabiah Games	Ramat Gan, Israel	2nd	Long jump	7.27 m
2009	World Championships	Berlin, Germany	42nd (q)	Long jump	7.42 m
2010	European Championships	Barcelona, Spain	18th (q)	Long jump	7.90 m
2010	European Championships	Barcelona, Spain	11th	Triple jump	16.43 m
2011	European Indoor Championships	Paris, France	12th (q)	Triple jump	16.34 m
2012	European Championships	Helsinki, Finland	8th	Triple jump	16.67 m
2013	European Indoor Championships	Gothenburg, Sweden	19th (q)	Triple jump	16.19 m

== See also ==
- List of Israeli records in athletics
