= 2010 Bislett Games =

- Dates: 4 June 2010
- Host city: Oslo, Norway
- Venue: Bislett Stadium
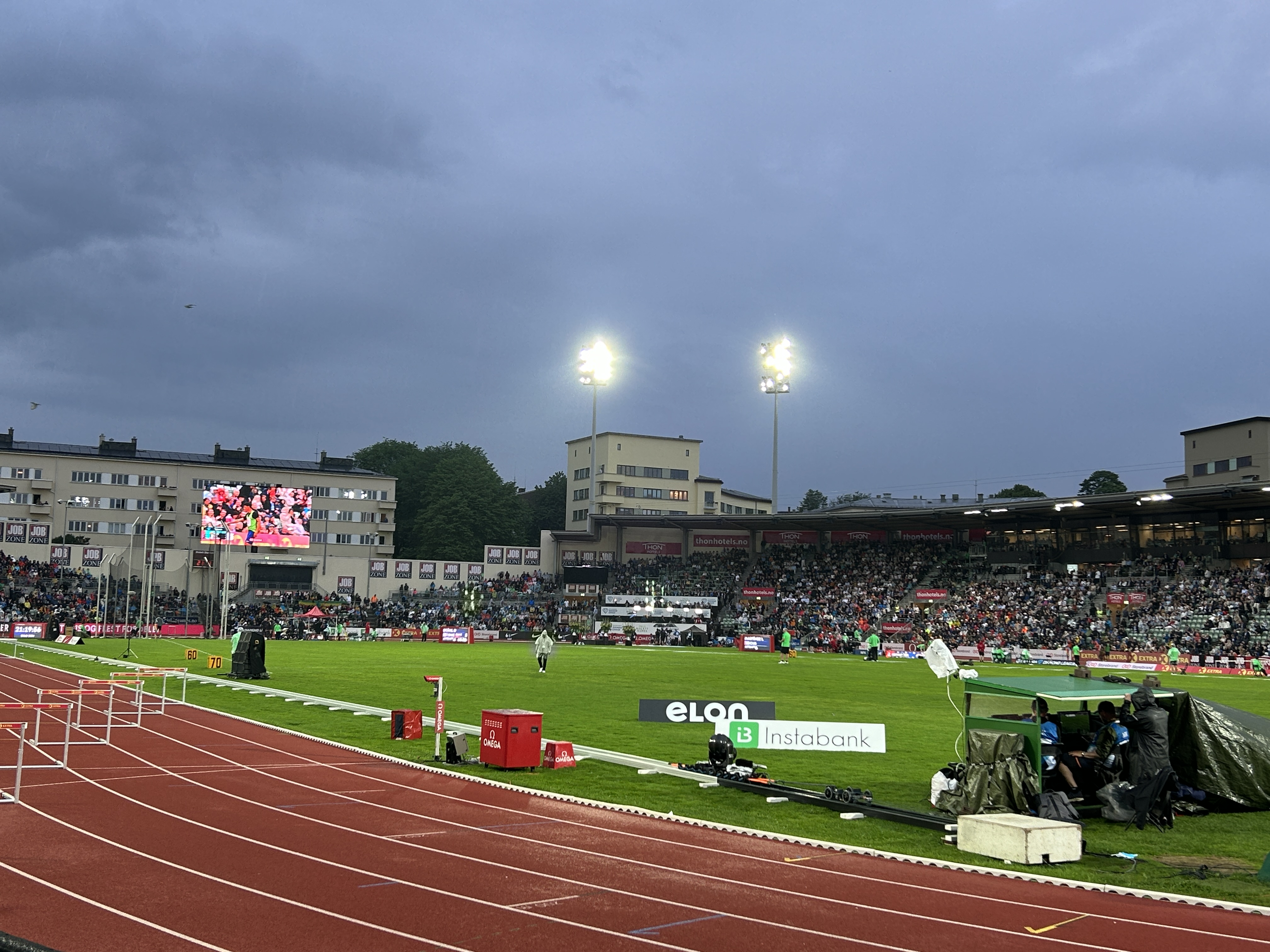
- Level: 2010 Diamond League

The 2010 Bislett Games was the 46th edition of the annual outdoor track and field meeting in Oslo, Norway. Held on 4 June at Bislett Stadium, it was the third leg of the 2010 Diamond League – the highest level international track and field circuit.

== Diamond discipline results ==
Podium finishers earned points towards a season leaderboard (4-2-1 respectively), points per event were then doubled in the Diamond League Finals. Athletes had to take part in the Diamond race during the finals to be eligible to win the Diamond trophy which is awarded to the athlete with the most points at the end of the season.

=== Men's ===
100 metres - Heats
Rank	Athlete	Nation	Time	Notes
Heat 1
1	Richard Thompson	Trinidad and Tobago	10.08	Q, SB
2	Michael Frater	Jamaica	10.08	Q, SB
3	Jaysuma Saidy Ndure	Norway	10.09	Q
4	Churandy Martina	Netherlands Antilles	10.11	q
5	Ronald Pognon	France	10.31	
6	Mario Forsythe	Jamaica	10.32	
7	Philip Bjørnå Berntsen	Norway	10.75	
			Wind: (+1.7 m/s)	
Heat 2
1	Asafa Powell	Jamaica	10.05	Q
2	Trell Kimmons	United States	10.09	Q, PB
3	Martial Mbandjock	France	10.09	Q, SB
4	Lerone Clarke	Jamaica	10.10	q, SB
5	Ryan Moseley	Austria	10.18	PB
6	Mark Lewis-Francis	Great Britain	10.24	
			Wind: (+1.2 m/s)	

100 metres - Final
Rank	Athlete	Nation	Time	Points	Notes
1st place, gold medalist(s)	Asafa Powell	Jamaica	9.72	4	
2nd place, silver medalist(s)	Richard Thompson	Trinidad and Tobago	9.90	2	
3rd place, bronze medalist(s)	Churandy Martina	Netherlands Antilles	9.92	1	
4	Michael Frater	Jamaica	9.97		
5	Trell Kimmons	United States	10.08		
6	Lerone Clarke	Jamaica	10.11		
7	Jaysuma Saidy Ndure	Norway	10.14		
8	Martial Mbandjock	France	10.26		
			Wind: (+2.1 m/s)		

800 Metres
Rank	Athlete	Nation	Time	Points	Notes
1st place, gold medalist(s)	David Rudisha	Kenya	1:42.04	4	MR, WL
2nd place, silver medalist(s)	Abubaker Kaki Khamis	Sudan	1:42.23	2	NR
3rd place, bronze medalist(s)	Marcin Lewandowski	Poland	1:44.56	1	SB
4	Michael Rimmer	Great Britain	1:44.98		
5	Alfred Kirwa Yego	Kenya	1:45.14		SB
6	Bram Som	Netherlands	1:45.21		
7	Adam Kszczot	Poland	1:45.75		
8	Thomas Roth	Norway	1:48.79		
9	Augustine Kiprono Choge	Kenya	1:50.03		
—	Sammy Tangui	Kenya	DNF		PM

Mile
Rank	Athlete	Nation	Time	Points	Notes
1st place, gold medalist(s)	Asbel Kiprop	Kenya	3:49.56	4	WL
2nd place, silver medalist(s)	Mekonnen Gebremedhin	Ethiopia	3:49.83	2	PB
3rd place, bronze medalist(s)	Gideon Gathimba	Kenya	3:50.53	1	PB
4	İlham Tanui Özbilen	Kenya	3:50.75		
5	Boaz Kiplagat Lalang	Kenya	3:52.18		PB
6	Deresse Mekonnen	Ethiopia	3:53.52		
7	Geoffrey Rono	Kenya	3:54.37		
8	Peter van der Westhuizen	South Africa	3:54.90		PB
9	Mohamad Al-Garni	Qatar	3:55.50		
10	Juan Carlos Higuero	Spain	3:56.71		
11	Jakub Holuša	Czech Republic	3:56.75		
12	Andy Baddeley	Great Britain	4:00.66		
—	Collins Cheboi	Kenya	DNF		PM
—	Benson Marrianyi Esho	Kenya	DNF		PM

5000 metres
Rank	Athlete	Nation	Time	Points	Notes
1st place, gold medalist(s)	Imane Merga	Ethiopia	12:53.81	4	PB
2nd place, silver medalist(s)	Tariku Bekele	Ethiopia	12:53.97	2	
3rd place, bronze medalist(s)	Bernard Lagat	United States	12:54.12	1	AR
4	Lucas Rotich	Kenya	12:55.06		PB
5	Vincent Chepkok	Kenya	12:56.32		
6	Chris Solinsky	United States	12:56.66		PB
7	Alemayehu Bezabeh	Spain	12:57.25		NR
8	Mathew Kisorio	Kenya	12:57.83		PB
9	Bekana Daba	Ethiopia	12:58.51		PB
10	Leonard Komon	Kenya	12:59.15		
11	Saif Saaeed Shaheen	Qatar	13:00.31		
12	Edwin Soi	Kenya	13:07.70		
13	Daniel Lemashon Salel	Kenya	13:08.23		PB
14	Eliud Kipchoge	Kenya	13:09.89		
15	Abera Kuma	Ethiopia	13:10.89		PB
16	Yusuf Biwott	Kenya	13:15.33		
17	Ayele Abshero	Ethiopia	13:18.38		
—	James Kwalia	Qatar	DNF		
—	Markos Geneti	Ethiopia	DNF		
—	Bethwell Birgen	Kenya	DNF		PM
—	Remmy Limo Ndiwa	Kenya	DNF		PM

400 metres hurdles
Rank	Athlete	Nation	Time	Points	Notes
1st place, gold medalist(s)	Kerron Clement	United States	48.12	4	SB
2nd place, silver medalist(s)	Bershawn Jackson	United States	48.25	2	SB
3rd place, bronze medalist(s)	Dai Greene	Great Britain	49.05	1	=SB
4	Isa Phillips	Jamaica	49.38		
5	L. J. van Zyl	South Africa	49.50		
6	Justin Gaymon	United States	49.56		
7	Michael Tinsley	United States	49.70		
8	Andreas Totsås	Norway	52.87		

Pole vault
Rank	Athlete	Nation	Height	Points	Notes
1st place, gold medalist(s)	Renaud Lavillenie	France	5.80 m	4	SB
2nd place, silver medalist(s)	Malte Mohr	Germany	5.70 m	2	=SB
3rd place, bronze medalist(s)	Aleksandr Gripich	Russia	5.60 m	1	=SB
4	Przemysław Czerwiński	Poland	5.60 m		=SB
4	Michal Balner	Czech Republic	5.60 m		SB
6	Derek Miles	United States	5.40 m		
7	Maksym Mazuryk	Ukraine	5.40 m		
—	Steven Lewis	Great Britain	NM		
—	Steve Hooker	Australia	NM		
—	Alexander Straub	Germany	NM		

Shot put
Rank	Athlete	Nation	Distance	Points	Notes
1st place, gold medalist(s)	Christian Cantwell	United States	21.31 m	4	
2nd place, silver medalist(s)	Dylan Armstrong	Canada	21.16 m	2	
3rd place, bronze medalist(s)	Tomasz Majewski	Poland	21.12 m	1	SB
4	Reese Hoffa	United States	20.69 m		
5	Ralf Bartels	Germany	20.59 m		
~~6~~	~~Pavel Lyzhyn~~	~~Belarus~~	~~20.41 m~~		DQ (Note: Due to doping violations Lyzhyn's results between 15 August 2008 and 14 August 2010 were disqualified.)
7	Adam Nelson	United States	19.91 m		
8	Kim Christensen	Denmark	18.92 m		SB

Javelin throw
Rank	Athlete	Nation	Distance	Points	Notes
1st place, gold medalist(s)	Andreas Thorkildsen	Norway	86.00 m	4	
2nd place, silver medalist(s)	Petr Frydrych	Czech Republic	85.33 m	2	
3rd place, bronze medalist(s)	Teemu Wirkkala	Finland	85.04 m	1	SB
4	Tero Pitkämäki	Finland	84.43 m		
5	Guillermo Martínez	Cuba	84.35 m		
6	Ari Mannio	Finland	83.81 m		SB
7	Antti Ruuskanen	Finland	83.45 m		
8	Vadims Vasiļevskis	Latvia	82.61 m		SB

=== Women's ===
200 metres
Rank	Athlete	Nation	Time	Points	Notes
1st place, gold medalist(s)	Carmelita Jeter	United States	22.54	4	
2nd place, silver medalist(s)	Debbie Ferguson-McKenzie	Bahamas	22.89	2	
3rd place, bronze medalist(s)	Aleksandra Fedoriva	Russia	22.98	1	
4	Cydonie Mothersille	Cayman Islands	22.99		
5	Sheri-Ann Brooks	Jamaica	23.18		
6	Ebonie Floyd	United States	23.20		
7	Anneisha McLaughlin-Whilby	Jamaica	23.37		
—	LaShauntea Moore	United States	DQ		R 163.3
			Wind: (+1.0 m/s)		

400 metres
Rank	Athlete	Nation	Time	Points	Notes
1st place, gold medalist(s)	Amantle Montsho	Botswana	50.34	4	
2nd place, silver medalist(s)	Novlene Williams-Mills	Jamaica	50.43	2	
3rd place, bronze medalist(s)	Debbie Dunn	United States	50.75	1	
4	Christine Ohuruogu	Great Britain	50.98		
5	Lashinda Demus	United States	51.09		
6	Shericka Williams	Jamaica	51.51		
7	Denisa Helceletová	Czech Republic	51.62		
8	Monica Hargrove	United States	52.14		

100 metres hurdles
Rank	Athlete	Nation	Time	Points	Notes
1st place, gold medalist(s)	Lolo Jones	United States	12.66	4	SB
2nd place, silver medalist(s)	Priscilla Lopes-Schliep	Canada	12.72	2	
3rd place, bronze medalist(s)	Perdita Felicien	Canada	12.72	1	SB
4	Danielle Carruthers	United States	12.74		SB
5	Delloreen Ennis-London	Jamaica	12.80		
6	Christina Vukicevic	Norway	12.91		
7	Kellie Wells	United States	13.00		
8	Carolin Nytra	Germany	13.14		
			Wind: (+1.3 m/s)		

3000 metres steeplechase
Rank	Athlete	Nation	Time	Points	Notes
1st place, gold medalist(s)	Milcah Chemos Cheywa	Kenya	9:12.66	4	MR, WL
2nd place, silver medalist(s)	Gladys Kipkemoi	Kenya	9:16.21	2	
3rd place, bronze medalist(s)	Lydia Rotich	Kenya	9:18.03	1	
4	Sofia Assefa	Ethiopia	9:23.45		
5	Wioletta Frankiewicz	Poland	9:25.77		
6	Katarzyna Kowalska	Poland	9:31.16		
7	Ancuța Bobocel	Romania	9:34.63		
8	Elizabeth Mueni	Kenya	9:36.92		
9	Sophie Duarte	France	9:37.82		
10	Karoline Bjerkeli Grøvdal	Norway	9:39.54		
11	Ulrika Flodin	Sweden	9:53.63		
12	Sandra Eriksson	Finland	10:01.94		
—	Mardrea Hyman	Jamaica	DNF		PM

High jump
Rank	Athlete	Nation	Height	Points	Notes
1st place, gold medalist(s)	Blanka Vlašić	Croatia	2.01 m	4	SB
2nd place, silver medalist(s)	Chaunté Lowe	United States	2.01 m	2	
3rd place, bronze medalist(s)	Levern Spencer	Saint Lucia	1.94 m	1	
4	Ruth Beitia	Spain	1.90 m		
4	Svetlana Shkolina	Russia	1.90 m		
6	Irina Gordeeva	Russia	1.90 m		
7	Emma Green	Sweden	1.90 m		=SB
8	Stine Kufaas	Norway	1.80 m		

Long jump
Rank	Athlete	Nation	Distance	Points	Notes
1st place, gold medalist(s)	Olga Kucherenko	Russia	6.91 m (+0.7 m/s)	4	
2nd place, silver medalist(s)	Naide Gomes	Portugal	6.78 m (+1.3 m/s)	2	SB
3rd place, bronze medalist(s)	Darya Klishina	Russia	6.77 m (+1.2 m/s)	1	
4	Yelena Sokolova	Russia	6.68 m (−0.1 m/s)		SB
5	Ivana Španović	Serbia	6.65 m (+1.4 m/s)		SB
6	Keila Costa	Brazil	6.42 m (+0.1 m/s)		
7	Margrethe Renstrøm	Norway	6.41 m (+3.1 m/s)		
8	Carolina Klüft	Sweden	6.38 m (+1.6 m/s)		SB
9	Brianna Glenn	United States	6.36 m (+0.5 m/s)		
10	Funmi Jimoh	United States	6.20 m (+0.5 m/s)		

Discus throw
Rank	Athlete	Nation	Distance	Points	Notes
1st place, gold medalist(s)	Nadine Müller	Germany	63.93 m	4	
2nd place, silver medalist(s)	Żaneta Glanc	Poland	62.16 m	2	SB
3rd place, bronze medalist(s)	Aretha Thurmond	United States	61.80 m	1	
4	Yarisley Collado	Cuba	61.20 m		
5	Nicoleta Grasu	Romania	60.86 m		
6	Sandra Elkasević	Croatia	59.71 m		
7	Anna Söderberg	Sweden	58.47 m		SB
8	Grete Etholm	Norway	52.66 m		
—	Yarelys Barrios	Cuba	NM		

== Promotional events results ==
=== Men's ===
1500 metres
Rank	Athlete	Nation	Time	Notes
1st place, gold medalist(s)	Manuel Olmedo	Spain	3:36.98	
2nd place, silver medalist(s)	Álvaro Rodríguez	Spain	3:37.39	
3rd place, bronze medalist(s)	Yoann Kowal	France	3:38.34	
4	Thomas Chamney	Ireland	3:39.02	
5	Nick McCormick	Great Britain	3:39.76	
6	Jermaine Mays	Great Britain	3:39.84	
7	Henrik Ingebrigtsen	Norway	3:40.14	
8	Ricky Stevenson	Great Britain	3:40.31	
9	Mitchell Kealey	Australia	3:41.47	
10	Alex Kipchirchir	Kenya	3:41.55	
11	Demma Daba	Ethiopia	3:42.05	PM
12	Morten Velde	Norway	3:53.80	
—	Kjetil Måkestad	Norway	DNF	

=== Women's ===
800 metres
Rank	Athlete	Nation	Time	Notes
1st place, gold medalist(s)	Anna Balakšina	Russia	2:01.65	
2nd place, silver medalist(s)	Winny Chebet	Kenya	2:02.03	
3rd place, bronze medalist(s)	Cherono Koech	Kenya	2:02.28	
4	Ingvill Måkestad Bovim	Norway	2:02.47	
5	Celia Taylor	Great Britain	2:02.57	
6	Marilyn Okoro	Great Britain	2:02.80	
7	Ewelina Sętowska-Dryk	Poland	2:03.90	
8	Susan Krumins	Netherlands	2:05.22	
—	Justyna Zembrzuska	Poland	DNF	PM

100 metres hurdles
Rank	Athlete	Nation	Time	Notes
1st place, gold medalist(s)	Tiffany Porter	United States	13.06	
2nd place, silver medalist(s)	Eline Berings	Belgium	13.15	
3rd place, bronze medalist(s)	Nichole Denby	United States	13.27	
4	Marie Hagle	Norway	13.70	
5	Isabelle Pedersen	Norway	13.79	
6	Tale Ørving	Norway	13.79	
7	Kine Aaltvedt	Norway	13.89	
8	Tine Teigene Dalen	Norway	14.04	
			Wind: (−0.8 m/s)	

== National events results ==
=== Men's ===
800 metres
Rank	Athlete	Nation	Time	Notes
1st place, gold medalist(s)	Jørgen Hasle Johansen	Norway	1:50.04	
2nd place, silver medalist(s)	Vidar Dahle	Norway	1:50.07	
3rd place, bronze medalist(s)	Ådne Svahn Dæhlin	Norway	1:50.91	
4	Eivind Jenssen	Norway	1:51.84	
5	Torje Klevmo	Norway	1:52.01	
6	Noor Jamae Adan	Norway	1:52.07	
7	Kristoffer Grindedal Janson	Norway	1:52.60	
8	Jorge Pascual	Spain	1:52.65	
9	Vegard Løberg Gjelsvik	Norway	1:52.90	
10	Vegard Vegard	Norway	1:53.31	
11	Øystein Kværner Svendsen	Norway	1:53.53	
—	Andreas Roth	Norway	DNF	

5000 metres
Rank	Athlete	Nation	Time	Notes
1st place, gold medalist(s)	Urige Buta	Ethiopia	13:58.50	
2nd place, silver medalist(s)	John Sompol Mnangat	Kenya	14:01.24	
3rd place, bronze medalist(s)	Dabaya Badhaso	Norway	14:21.12	
4	Lars Erik Malde	Norway	14:30.13	
5	Joachim Brøndbo	Norway	14:31.52	
6	Audun Nordtveit	Norway	14:33.58	
7	Asle Rønning Tjelta	Norway	14:44.69	
8	Anton Danielsson	Sweden	14:44.78	
9	Håkon Brox	Norway	14:46.90	
10	Petter Eggan	Norway	14:47.45	
11	Asbjørn Ellefsen Persen	Norway	14:52.71	
12	Anders Huun Monsen	Norway	14:59.23	
13	Ola Sakshaug	Norway	15:03.29	
—	Tommy Bernard Laitinen	Norway	DNF	

=== Women's ===
100 metres
Rank	Athlete	Nation	Time	Notes
1st place, gold medalist(s)	Mikele Barber	United States	11.17	
2nd place, silver medalist(s)	Ezinne Okparaebo	Norway	11.26	NR
3rd place, bronze medalist(s)	Jenny Kallur	Sweden	11.64	
4	Emma Rienas	Sweden	11.79	
5	Lena Berntsson	Sweden	11.86	
6	Siri Eritsland	Norway	11.91	
7	Mari Gilde Brubak	Norway	12.00	
8	Ida Bakke Hansen	Norway	12.06	
			Wind: (+0.9 m/s)	

400 metres
Rank	Athlete	Nation	Time	Notes
1st place, gold medalist(s)	Rebecca Högberg	Sweden	53.97	
2nd place, silver medalist(s)	Irene Høvik Helgesen	Norway	54.80	
3rd place, bronze medalist(s)	Benedicte Hauge	Norway	54.85	
4	Nina Katrine Brandt	Norway	54.99	
5	Randi Kjerstad	Norway	56.23	
6	Line Kloster	Norway	60.11	

== U20 events results ==
=== Men's ===
110 Metres Hurdles (99.0cm)
Rank	Athlete	Nation	Time	Notes
1st place, gold medalist(s)	Jack Meredith	Great Britain	13.32	
2nd place, silver medalist(s)	Vladimir Vukicevic	Norway	13.42	
3rd place, bronze medalist(s)	Filip Lööv	Sweden	13.95	
4	James McLean	Great Britain	13.97	
5	Christian Nielsen	Denmark	14.46	
6	Per Magne Florvaag	Norway	14.94	
			Wind: (+0.3 m/s)	

== See also ==
- 2010 Diamond League
