= Athletics at the 2007 All-Africa Games – Men's 1500 metres =

The men's 1500 metres at the 2007 All-Africa Games were held on July 21–22.

== Medalists ==
Gold	Silver	Bronze
Asbel Kiprop; Kenya	Antar Zerguelaine; Algeria	Tarek Boukensa; Algeria

== Results ==
=== Heats ===
Qualification: First 4 of each heat (Q) and the next 4 fastest (q) qualified for the semifinals.

Rank	Heat	Name	Nationality	Time	Notes
1	1	Tarek Boukensa	Algeria	3:41.42	Q
2	1	Asbel Kiprop	Kenya	3:41.62	Q
3	1	Kamel Boulhafane	Algeria	3:41.79	Q
4	1	Abdisa Sori	Ethiopia	3:42.07	Q
5	1	Habtai Keleta	Eritrea	3:42.19	q
6	2	Antar Zerguelaine	Algeria	3:42.44	Q
7	1	Demma Daba	Ethiopia	3:42.45	q
8	2	Geoffrey Rono	Kenya	3:42.59	Q
9	2	Derese Mekonnen	Ethiopia	3:42.71	Q
10	2	Gideon Gathimba	Kenya	3:43.04	Q
11	1	Juan van Deventer	South Africa	3:43.25	q
12	2	Issak Sibhatu Zemicael	Eritrea	3:44.30	q
13	2	Abdulgadir Abdalla	Sudan	3:46.08	
14	2	Johan Cronje	South Africa	3:46.67	
15	1	Molefe Molefe	South Africa	3:47.73	
16	2	Jean Claude Niyonizigiye	Burundi	3:48.27	
17	1	Yhaya Osman	Sudan	3:49.02	
18	2	Helio Furno	Mozambique	3:49.59	
19	2	Aboubakar Gatroni	Libya	3:50.44	
20	2	Ansu Sowe	Gambia	3:52.32	
21	2	Mohamed Abdillahi Ahmed	Djibouti	3:55.74	
22	1	Chauncy Master	Malawi	3:55.98	
23	1	Godeffrey Rutayisire	Rwanda	3:57.22	
24	2	Aly Abebe Moussa	Mali	4:01.90	
25	1	Oume Taher	Chad	4:08.94	
26	1	Bill Rogers	Liberia	4:21.93	
27	1	Ouman Sylla Sekan	Guinea	4:26.24	
	2	Sakila Lufumba	Democratic Republic of the Congo	DNF	

=== Final ===
Rank	Name	Nationality	Time	Notes
1st place, gold medalist(s)	Asbel Kiprop	Kenya	3:38.97	
2nd place, silver medalist(s)	Antar Zerguelaine	Algeria	3:39.04	
3rd place, bronze medalist(s)	Tarek Boukensa	Algeria	3:39.18	
4	Derese Mekonnen	Ethiopia	3:40.01	
5	Kamel Boulhafane	Algeria	3:40.16	
6	Geoffrey Rono	Kenya	3:40.25	
7	Juan van Deventer	South Africa	3:40.48	
8	Demma Daba	Ethiopia	3:40.57	
9	Issak Sibhatu Zemicale	Eritrea	3:40.99	
10	Habtai Keleta	Eritrea	3:42.23	
	Abdisa Sori	Ethiopia	DNS	
	Gideon Gathimba	Kenya	DNS	
