= 2002 World Junior Championships in Athletics – Men's 1500 metres =

The men's 1500 metres event at the 2002 World Junior Championships in Athletics was held in Kingston, Jamaica, at National Stadium on 19 and 21 July.

== Medalists ==
Gold	Yassine Bensghir; Morocco
Silver	Abdul Rahman Suleiman; Qatar
Bronze	Samuel Mwera; Tanzania

== Results ==
=== Final ===
21 July

Rank	Name	Nationality	Time	Notes
1st place, gold medalist(s)	Yassine Bensghir	Morocco	3:40.72	
2nd place, silver medalist(s)	Abdul Rahman Suleiman	Qatar	3:41.72	
3rd place, bronze medalist(s)	Samuel Mwera	Tanzania	3:41.75	
4	Nick Willis	New Zealand	3:42.69	
5	Toni Mohr	Germany	3:44.46	
6	Arturo Casado	Spain	3:44.67	
7	Isaac Songok	Kenya	3:44.93	
8	Juan Luis Barrios	Mexico	3:44.97	
9	Andrew O'Neill	Australia	3:45.61	
10	Cosmin Suteu	Romania	3:45.76	
11	Chris Lukezic	United States	3:46.01	
12	Samson Kiplagat	Kenya	3:50.05	

=== Heats ===
19 July

==== Heat 1 ====
Rank	Name	Nationality	Time	Notes
1	Samuel Mwera	Tanzania	3:43.56	Q
2	Yassine Bensghir	Morocco	3:44.51	Q
3	Samson Kiplagat	Kenya	3:45.16	Q
4	Nick Willis	New Zealand	3:45.98	Q
5	Chris Lukezic	United States	3:46.24	q
6	Andrew O'Neill	Australia	3:46.40	q
7	Patrick Schulz	Germany	3:49.05	
8	Marcus van der Koelen	Netherlands	3:49.20	
9	Mourad Naami	Algeria	3:49.27	
10	John Lindström	Sweden	3:50.24	
11	Abdelkader Mahmoudi	France	3:53.59	
12	Koichi Murakami	Japan	3:55.20	
13	Sergio Vallejo	Spain	3:56.09	
14	Sabri Kara	Turkey	3:58.12	
15	Ajmal Amirov	Tajikistan	4:01.91	
16	Setefano Mika	Samoa	4:08.56	

==== Heat 2 ====
Rank	Name	Nationality	Time	Notes
1	Abdul Rahman Suleiman	Qatar	3:40.57	Q
2	Isaac Songok	Kenya	3:41.65	Q
3	Juan Luis Barrios	Mexico	3:42.00	Q
4	Toni Mohr	Germany	3:44.59	Q
5	Arturo Casado	Spain	3:46.69	q
6	Cosmin Suteu	Romania	3:48.23	q
7	Aleksandr Krivchonkov	Russia	3:49.07	
8	Daniel Spitzl	Austria	3:49.43	
9	Liam Reale	Ireland	3:50.52	
10	Mounir Yemmouni	France	3:50.99	
11	Shawn Forrest	Australia	3:54.85	
12	Hani Meguellati	Algeria	4:02.54	
13	Shaun Smith	Jamaica	4:13.88	
14	Park Ji-Yun	South Korea	4:26.34	
15	Keith Sepety	Federated States of Micronesia	4:32.21	
	Vitaliy Gorlukovic	Lithuania	DNF	

== Participation ==
According to an unofficial count, 32 athletes from 26 countries participated in the event.

- Algeria (2)
- Australia (2)
- Austria (1)
- France (2)
- Germany (2)
- Ireland (1)
- Jamaica (1)
- Japan (1)
- Kenya (2)
- Lithuania (1)
- Mexico (1)
- Federated States of Micronesia (1)
- Morocco (1)
- Netherlands (1)
- New Zealand (1)
- Qatar (1)
- Romania (1)
- Russia (1)
- Samoa (1)
- South Korea (1)
- Spain (2)
- Sweden (1)
- Tajikistan (1)
- Tanzania (1)
- Turkey (1)
- United States (1)
