= 2010 Prefontaine Classic =

- Dates: July 3, 2010
- Host city: Eugene, Oregon, United States
- Venue: Hayward Field
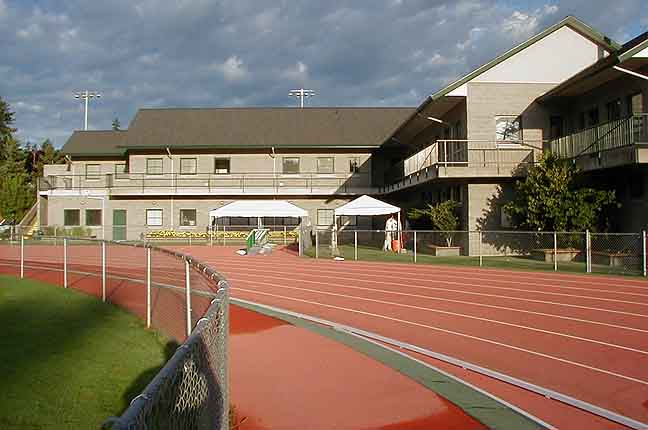
- Level: 2010 IAAF Diamond League
- Events: 19

The 2010 Prefontaine Classic was the 36th edition of the annual outdoor track and field meeting in Eugene, Oregon, United States. Held on Saturday July 3, 2010 at Hayward Field, it was the sixth leg of the inaugural IAAF Diamond League – the highest level international track and field circuit. Previously the Prefontaine Classic had been a part of the now defunct IAAF World Athletics Tour, but not in the IAAF Golden League which consisted of the top-tier meets in the tour.

The meet's debut in the Diamond League resulted in 12 new meeting records being set out of 19 contested events, with yearly world leading marks being set on top of five of the meeting record performances. In the men's events the 200 meters had been most anticipated, which Walter Dix won with a meeting record in 19.72 seconds, defeating second fastest man in history Tyson Gay who had recently returned to competition from groin surgery. Ethiopian Tariku Bekele ran a 5000 m meeting record in 12:58.93, also the best time ever run on American soil. David Oliver matched the American record in the 110 m hurdles with a world leading time and meeting record in 12.90 s, just 0.03 s slower than the world record. The shot put saw Christian Cantwell win by more than a meter, with a world leading mark and meeting record of 22.41 m. In the non-scoring 1000 m, Sudanese athlete Abubaker Kaki Khamis set a world leading time, national record, and meeting record in 2:13.62.

In the women's competition, Veronica Campbell-Brown defeated reigning Olympic and world champion Shelly-Ann Fraser over 100 m in 10.78 s, a world leading personal best time and a meeting record. Mariya Savinova set a world leading time and meeting record in the 800 m with a personal best time in 1:57.56. Though she did not win the triple jump, Canadian Tabia Charles set a national record with a mark of 13.99 m.

== Diamond League results ==
Top three placers in each scoring event earned four points, two points, and one point for first place, second place, and third place respectively.

=== Men ===
200 m (+1.8 m/s)
| Place | Athlete | Time | Points |
|---|---|---|---|
| 1 | Walter Dix (USA) | 19.72 MR | 8 (+4) |
| 2 | Tyson Gay (USA) | 19.76 | 2 (+2) |
| 3 | Ryan Bailey (USA) | 20.17 PB | 2 (+1) |
| 4 | Xavier Carter (USA) | 20.30 | 0 |
| 5 | Richard Thompson (TTO) | 20.48 | 0 |
| 6 | Shawn Crawford (USA) | 20.50 | 0 |
| 7 | Churandy Martina (AHO) | 20.52 | 0 |
| 8 | Jaysuma Saidy Ndure (NOR) | 20.67 | 0 |

Mile
| Place | Athlete | Time | Points |
|---|---|---|---|
| 1 | Asbel Kiprop (KEN) | 3:49.75 | 10 (+4) |
| 2 | Amine Laalou (MAR) | 3:50.22 | 2 (+2) |
| 3 | Mekonnen Gebremedhin (ETH) | 3:50.68 | 4 (+1) |
| 4 | Daniel Kipchirchir Komen (KEN) | 3:50.70 | 0 |
| 5 | Andrew Wheating (USA) | 3:51.74 PB | 0 |
| 6 | Nicholas Kiptanui Kemboi (KEN) | 3:52.84 | 0 |
| 7 | Lopez Lomong (USA) | 3:53.18 PB | 0 |
| 8 | Mohamed Moustaoui (MAR) | 3:53.70 | 0 |
| 9 | Bernard Lagat (USA) | 3:54.36 | 0 |
| 10 | Haron Keitany (KEN) | 3:57.07 | 0 |
| 11 | Leonel Manzano (USA) | 4:06.51 | 0 |
| DNF | Yusuf Saad Kamel (BHR) | Did not finish | 0 |
| DNF (PM) | Gideon Gathimba (KEN) | Did not finish (pacemaker) | 1 |
| DNF (PM) | Lachlan Renshaw (AUS) | Did not finish (pacemaker) | 0 |

5000 m
| Place | Athlete | Time | Points |
|---|---|---|---|
| 1 | Tariku Bekele (ETH) | 12:58.93 MR | 6 (+4) |
| 2 | Dejen Gebremeskel (ETH) | 12.59.30 PB | 2 (+2) |
| 3 | Imane Merga (ETH) | 13:00.18 | 10 (+1) |
| 4 | Eliud Kipchoge (KEN) | 13:01.71 | 4 |
| 5 | Bekana Daba (ETH) | 13:05.35 | 0 |
| 6 | Mathew Kisorio (KEN) | 13:07.26 | 0 |
| 7 | Chris Solinsky (USA) | 13:08.11 | 0 |
| 8 | Daniel Lemashon Salel (KEN) | 13:09.80 | 0 |
| 9 | Collis Birmingham (AUS) | 13:10.97 PB | 0 |
| 10 | Josphat Kipkoech Bett (KEN) | 13:11.60 | 0 |
| 11 | Abera Kuma (ETH) | 13:11.92 | 0 |
| 12 | Hosea Macharinyang (KEN) | 13:21.05 | 0 |
| 13 | Matt Tegenkamp (USA) | 13:25.09 | 0 |
| 14 | Juan Luis Barrios (MEX) | 13:30.09 | 0 |
| 15 | Leonard Patrick Komon (KEN) | 13:31.68 | 0 |
| DNF | Sammy Alex Mutahi (KEN) | Did not finish | 2 |
| DNF (PM) | Aron Rono (KEN) | Did not finish (pacemaker) | 0 |
| DNF (PM) | Ben True (USA) | Did not finish (pacemaker) | 0 |

110 m hurdles (+1.6 m/s)
| Place | Athlete | Time | Points |
|---|---|---|---|
| 1 | David Oliver (USA) | 12.90 WL =NR MR | 8 (+4) |
| 2 | Ryan Wilson (USA) | 13.16 | 2 (+2) |
| 3 | Ronnie Ash (USA) | 13.19 =PB | 1 (+1) |
| 4 | David Payne (USA) | 13.24 | 0 |
| 5 | Artur Noga (POL) | 13.29 PB | 0 |
| 6 | Antwon Hicks (USA) | 13.29 | 0 |
| 7 | Jason Richardson (USA) | 13.50 | 0 |
| 8 | Ryan Brathwaite (BAR) | 13.53 | 1 |

Long jump
| Place | Athlete | Mark | Points |
|---|---|---|---|
| 1 | Irving Saladino (PAN) | 8.46 m (+3.2 m/s) | 6 (+4) |
| 2 | Dwight Phillips (USA) | 8.41 m (+1.4 m/s) | 8 (+2) |
| 3 | Li Jinzhe (CHN) | 8.29 m (+3.5 m/s) | 1 (+1) |
| 4 | Trevell Quinley (USA) | 8.19 m (+1.9 m/s) | 0 |
| 5 | Fabrice Lapierre (AUS) | 8.17 m (+0.8 m/s) | 5 |
| 6 | Brian Johnson (USA) | 7.85 m (+2.1 m/s) | 0 |
| 7 | Yahya Berrabah (MAR) | 7.77 m (+2.0 m/s) | 0 |
| 8 | Sebastian Bayer (GER) | 7.65 m (+1.2 m/s) | 0 |

Shot put
| Place | Athlete | Mark | Points |
|---|---|---|---|
| 1 | Christian Cantwell (USA) | 22.41 m WL MR | 16 (+4) |
| 2 | Dylan Armstrong (CAN) | 21.33 m | 6 (+2) |
| 3 | Adam Nelson (USA) | 21.16 m | 1 (+1) |
| 4 | Ryan Whiting (USA) | 20.93 m | 0 |
| 5 | Tomasz Majewski (POL) | 20.90 m | 1 |
| 6 | Reese Hoffa (USA) | 20.75 m | 2 |
| 7 | Cory Martin (USA) | 20.50 m | 0 |
| 8 | Daniel Taylor (USA) | 20.47 m | 0 |

Discus throw
| Place | Athlete | Mark | Points |
|---|---|---|---|
| 1 | Piotr Małachowski (POL) | 67.66 m | 9 (+4) |
| 2 | Zoltán Kővágó (HUN) | 67.55 m | 7 (+2) |
| 3 | Jason Young (USA) | 66.95 m | 1 (+1) |
| 4 | Casey Malone (USA) | 66.03 m | 0 |
| 5 | Gerd Kanter (EST) | 65.75 m | 2 |
| 6 | Virgilijus Alekna (LTU) | 63.55 m | 0 |
| 7 | Jarred Rome (USA) | 62.46 m | 0 |
| 8 | Ian Waltz (USA) | 60.70 m | 0 |

=== Women ===
100 m (+0.8 m/s)
| Place | Athlete | Time | Points |
|---|---|---|---|
| 1 | Veronica Campbell-Brown (JAM) | 10.78 WL MR PB | 4 (+4) |
| 2 | Carmelita Jeter (USA) | 10.83 | 5 (+1) |
| 3 | LaShauntea Moore (USA) | 10.99 | 4 |
| 4 | Blessing Okagbare (NGR) | 11.03 PB | 0 |
| 5 | Sherone Simpson (JAM) | 11.14 | 0 |
| 6 | Tahesia Harrigan (IVB) | 11.16 | 1 |
| 7 | Chandra Sturrup (BAH) | 11.19 | 3 |
| DQ | Shelly-Ann Fraser (JAM) | Disqualified (failed drug test) | 0 |

400 m
| Place | Athlete | Time | Points |
|---|---|---|---|
| 1 | Allyson Felix (USA) | 50.27 | 8 (+4) |
| 2 | Amantle Montsho (BOT) | 50.30 | 8 (+2) |
| 3 | Shericka Williams (JAM) | 50.31 | 1 (+1) |
| 4 | Debbie Dunn (USA) | 50.56 | 1 |
| 5 | Antonina Krivoshapka (RUS) | 50.60 | 0 |
| 6 | Natasha Hastings (USA) | 50.64 | 0 |
| 7 | Novlene Williams-Mills (JAM) | 51.11 | 3 |
| 8 | Keshia Baker (USA) | 51.60 | 0 |

800 m
| Place | Athlete | Time | Points |
|---|---|---|---|
| 1 | Mariya Savinova (RUS) | 1:57.56 WL MR PB | 4 (+4) |
| 2 | Nancy Jebet Langat (KEN) | 1:57.75 PB | 2 (+2) |
| 3 | Janeth Jepkosgei (KEN) | 1:57.84 | 7 (+1) |
| 4 | Phoebe Wright (USA) | 1:58.22 PB | 0 |
| 5 | Alysia Johnson (USA) | 1:58.84 PB | 0 |
| 6 | Anna Pierce (USA) | 1:59.42 | 0 |
| 7 | Kenia Sinclair (JAM) | 1:59.55 | 1 |
| 8 | Maryam Yusuf Jamal (BHR) | 1:59.89 | 0 |
| 9 | Maggie Vessey (USA) | 1:59.90 | 0 |
| 10 | Shannon Rowbury (USA) | 2:00.47 PB | 0 |
| 11 | Pamela Jelimo (USA) | 2:03.14 | 0 |
| DNF (PM) | Karen Shinkins (IRL) | Did not finish (pacemaker) | 0 |

400 m hurdles
| Place | Athlete | Time | Points |
|---|---|---|---|
| 1 | Lashinda Demus (USA) | 53.03 MR | 12 (+4) |
| 2 | Kaliese Spencer (JAM) | 53.78 | 4 (+2) |
| 3 | Josanne Lucas (TRI) | 55.08 | 1 (+1) |
| 4 | Sheena Johnson-Tosta (USA) | 55.53 | 0 |
| 5 | Ajoke Odumosu (NGR) | 55.76 | 0 |
| 6 | Nicole Leach (USA) | 56.18 | 0 |
| 7 | Fawn Dorr (USA) | 57.32 | 0 |
| 8 | Ebony Collins (USA) | 58.36 | 0 |

3000 m steeplechase
| Place | Athlete | Time | Points |
|---|---|---|---|
| 1 | Milcah Chemos Cheywa (KEN) | 9:26.70 | 14 (+4) |
| 2 | Sofia Assefa (ETH) | 9:30.05 | 1 (+1) |
| 3 | Korene Hinds (JAM) | 9:32.20 | 0 |
| 4 | Bridget Franek (USA) | 9:32.35 PB | 0 |
| 5 | Barbara Parker (GBR) | 9:35.17 PB | 0 |
| 6 | Lisa Aguilera (USA) | 9:45.50 | 0 |
| 7 | Nicole Bush (USA) | 9:53.34 | 0 |
| 8 | Shayla Houlihan (USA) | 9:57.11 PB | 0 |
| 9 | Kara June (USA) | 10:18.50 | 0 |
| DNF | Yuliya Zarudneva (RUS) | Did not finish | 0 |
| DNF (PM) | Mardrea Hyman (JAM) | Did not finish (pacemaker) | 0 |
| DQ | Marta Domínguez (ESP) | Disqualified (doping) | 0 |

Pole vault
| Place | Athlete | Mark | Points |
|---|---|---|---|
| 1 | Fabiana Murer (BRA) | 4.58 m | 8 (+4) |
| 2 | Anna Rogowska (POL) | 4.58 m | 4 (+2) |
| 3 | Yuliya Golubchikova (RUS) | 4.48 m | 1 (+1) |
| 4 | Lacy Janson (USA) | 4.48 m | 1 |
| 5 | Aleksandra Kiryashova (RUS) | 4.48 m | 0 |
| 6 | Chelsea Johnson (USA) | 4.28 m | 0 |
| NM | Monika Pyrek (POL) | No mark | 0 |
| NM | Jenn Suhr (USA) | No mark | 0 |

Triple jump
| Place | Athlete | Mark | Points |
|---|---|---|---|
| 1 | Nadezhda Alekhina (RUS) | 14.63 m (−0.4 m/s) MR | 4 (+4) |
| 2 | Olga Rypakova (KAZ) | 14.45 m (−0.4 m/s) | 8 (+2) |
| 3 | Erica McLain (USA) | 14.33 m (−0.3 m/s) PB | 1 (+1) |
| 4 | Tabia Charles (CAN) | 13.99 m (+0.6 m/s) NR | 0 |
| 5 | Toni Smith (USA) | 13.81 m (+0.4 m/s) | 0 |
| 6 | Shakeema Walker-Welsch (USA) | 13.63 m (−0.9 m/s) | 0 |
| NM | Anastasiya Taranova-Potapova (RUS) | No mark | 0 |
| NM | Xie Limei (CHN) | No mark | 0 |

Javelin throw
| Place | Athlete | Mark | Points |
|---|---|---|---|
| 1 | Kara Patterson (USA) | 65.90 m MR | 4 (+4) |
| 2 | Martina Ratej (SLO) | 64.40 m | 3 (+2) |
| 3 | Barbora Špotáková (CZE) | 61.12 m | 7 (+1) |
| 4 | Rachel Yurkovich (USA) | 58.42 m | 0 |
| 5 | Madara Palameika (LAT) | 53.37 m | 0 |
| 6 | Alicia DeShasier (USA) | 50.77 m | 0 |

== Non-Diamond League results ==
=== Men ===
| Event | First | | Second | | Third | |
|---|---|---|---|---|---|---|
| 1000 m | Abubaker Kaki Khamis (SUD) | 2:13.62 WL NR MR | Boaz Lalang (KEN) | 2:14.83 | Nick Symmonds (USA) | 2:16.35 |
| Mile | Ryan Gregson (AUS) | 3:53.19 | Andrew J. Acosta (USA) | 3:53.76 | Juan van Deventer (RSA) | 3:54.12 |

=== Women ===
| Event | First | | Second | | Third | |
|---|---|---|---|---|---|---|
| 5000 m | Tirunesh Dibaba (ETH) | 14:34.07 MR | Shalane Flanagan (USA) | 14:49.08 | Sally Kipyego (KEN) | 14:54.50 |
| Hammer throw | Tatyana Lysenko (RUS) | 75.98 m MR | Betty Heidler (GER) | 74.87 m | Sultana Frizell (CAN) | 70.76 m |
