= 2005 World Championships in Athletics – Men's 1500 metres =

The men's 1500 metres at the 2005 World Championships in Athletics was held on August 6, 8 and 10 at the Helsinki Olympic Stadium. The winning margin was 0.12 seconds.

With the retirement of defending champion, reigning Olympic Champion and World record holder Hicham El Guerrouj and Olympic silver medalist Bernard Lagat involved in citizenship issues as he moved to the United States, the role of favorite opened up to another Moroccan, Rashid Ramzi who had transplanted his citizenship to Bahrain while continuing to train in Morocco. Returning silver medalist Mehdi Baala didn't make it out of the semi-final round.

The race was led from the start, as it had been two years earlier, by Reyes Estévez who was known as a kicker, leading the field though a casual 60+ second first lap. Alan Webb marked Estévez, nervously trying to figure out a way to take the kick out of the faster runners. Rams added to his tension by coasting up to Webb's shoulder as the second lap began with the rest of the field bunching up behind. Just after the end of the second lap, Webb took off sprinting, timed in 12.3 between 800 and 900 meters. He opened up a four mere lead but Alex Kipchirchir and Ramzi followed by the rest of the field were in hot pursuit. Webb was unable to maintain his breakaway. In the penultimate turn he was passed by Ramzi who did have a breakaway, chased most closely by returning bronze medalist Ivan Heshko. Down the final backstretch Kipchirchir went by on the outside and Olympic bronze medalist Rui Silva squeezed by on the inside, Webb was cooked. From 9th place, deep in the field, Adil Kaouch began a final sprint, passing three as the slowing Webb was an obstacle. Continuing through the final turn, Kaouch passed everybody except Ramzi. Down the final stretch Ramzi's lead looked like it might not be enough but Ramzi was able to hold on for the win. Following Kaouch, Silva was also sprinting, after passing Heshko the medalists were decided. As Kaouch's gaining diminished he continued at his same pace, but Silva finished with an all out rush to the line missing the silver medal by a mere .02 of a second.

Lagat would return to competition to beat Ramzi to silver in 2007. But Ramzi took the Olympic gold medal in 2008. That gold was short-lived as Ramzi was disqualified for having CERA in his system. While Ramzi's World Championship medals have not been disqualified, the Olympic disqualification puts a taint on Ramzi's accomplishments.

== Medalists ==
Gold	Rashid Ramzi; Bahrain (BHR)
Silver	Adil Kaouch; Morocco (MAR)
Bronze	Rui Silva; Portugal (POR)

== Results ==
All times shown are in seconds.

AR area record | CR championship record | GR games record | NR national record | OR Olympic record | PB personal best | SB season best | WL world leading (in a given season)
DNS = did not start | DQ = disqualification | NM = no mark (i.e. no valid result) | Q = qualification by place in heat | q = qualification by overall place

=== Heats ===
August 6, 2005

==== Heat 1 ====
1. (France) Mehdi Baala 3:36.56 Q
2. (Algeria) Tarek Boukensa 3:36.70 Q
3. (Kenya) Alex Kipchirchir 3:36.74 Q
4. (Canada) Kevin Sullivan 3:36.80 Q
5. (United Kingdom) Michael East 3:36.84 Q
6. (United States) Alan Webb 3:36.84 q
7. (Morocco) Yassine Bensghir 3:37.11 q
8. (Spain) Juan Carlos Higuero 3:37.40 q
9. (Belgium) Joeri Jansen 3:39.43 q
10. (New Zealand) Adrian Blincoe 3:39.54 q
11. (Finland) Jonas Hamm 3:43.20
12. (Djibouti) Ahmed Mohamed Abdillahi 3:50.92 (PB)
13. (Japan) Fumikazu Kobayashi 3:51.76
- (Sudan) Peter Roko Ashak DNS

==== Heat 2 ====
1. (Spain) Arturo Casado 3:41.64 Q
2. (Morocco) Adil Kaouch 3:41.75 Q (SB)
3. (United States) Christopher Lukezic 3:41.80 Q
4. (Portugal) Rui Silva 3:41.83 Q
5. (Qatar) Daham Najim Bashir 3:41.88 Q
6. (Kenya) Daniel Kipchirchir Komen 3:41.91
7. (France) Mounir Yemmouni 3:42.39
8. (Algeria) Antar Zerguelaine 3:43.02
9. (Bahrain) Belal Mansoor Ali 3:43.15
10. (Brazil) Hudson de Souza 3:43.18
11. (United Kingdom) Nick McCormick 3:44.40
12. (Ethiopia) Mulugeta Wendimu 3:44.42
- (Tanzania) Samwel Mwera DNS
- (Timor-Leste) Alin Soares DNS

==== Heat 3 ====
1. (Bahrain) Rashid Ramzi 3:38.32 Q
2. (Ukraine) Ivan Heshko 3:39.84 Q
3. (New Zealand) Nicholas Willis 3:39.89 Q
4. (Spain) Reyes Estévez 3:39.93 Q
5. (Ethiopia) Markos Geneti 3:39.94 Q
6. (Morocco) Youssef Baba 3:39.96 q
7. (United States) Rob Myers 3:40.16 q
8. (Canada) Nathan Brannen 3:40.69 q
9. (South Africa) Johan Cronje 3:41.43 q
10. (Kenya) Augustine Kiprono Choge 3:41.70
11. (Republic of Ireland) James Nolan 3:42.53
12. (Armenia) Armen Asyran 4:03.21
- (Algeria) Kamal Boulahfane DNS

=== Semifinals ===
August 8, 2005

==== Heat 1 ====
1. (Morocco) Adil Kaouch 3:40.51 Q (SB)
2. (Spain) Arturo Casado 3:40.61 Q
3. (Kenya) Alex Kipchirchir 3:40.68 Q
4. (Portugal) Rui Silva 3:40.72 Q
5. (Spain) Reyes Estévez 3:40.73 Q
6. (New Zealand) Nicholas Willis 3:40.87
7. (Canada) Kevin Sullivan 3:41.00
8. (France) Mehdi Baala 3:41.34
9. (Morocco) Youssef Baba 3:42.12
10. (United States) Rob Myers 3:42.38
11. (South Africa) Johan Cronje 3:42.77
12. (Ethiopia) Markos Geneti 3:42.80

==== Heat 2 ====
1. (Bahrain) Rashid Ramzi 3:34.69 Q
2. (United States) Alan Webb 3:36.07 Q
3. (Algeria) Tarek Boukensa 3:36.14 Q
4. (Qatar) Daham Najim Bashir 3:36.38 Q
5. (Ukraine) Ivan Heshko 3:36.60 Q
6. (Spain) Juan Carlos Higuero 3:36.65 q
7. (Morocco) Yassine Bensghir 3:36.76 q
8. (United States) Christopher Lukezic 3:37.20
9. (New Zealand) Adrian Blincoe 3:38.20
10. (Canada) Nathan Brannen 3:39.37
11. (United Kingdom) Michael East 3:40.27
12. (Belgium) Joeri Jansen 3:44.88

=== Final ===
August 10, 2005

1. (Bahrain) Rashid Ramzi 3:37.88
2. (Morocco) Adil Kaouch 3:38.00 (SB)
3. (Portugal) Rui Silva 3:38.02
4. (Ukraine) Ivan Heshko 3:38.71
5. (Spain) Arturo Casado 3:39.45
6. (Spain) Juan Carlos Higuero 3:40.34
7. (Kenya) Alex Kipchirchir 3:40.43
8. (Algeria) Tarek Boukensa 3:41.01
9. (United States) Alan Webb 3:41.04
10. (Qatar) Daham Najim Bashir 3:43.48
11. (Spain) Reyes Estévez 3:46.65
12. (Morocco) Yassine Bensghir 3:50.19
