= 2010 IAAF World Indoor Championships – Men's 1500 metres =

The men's 1500 metres at the 2010 IAAF World Indoor Championships was held at the ASPIRE Dome on 12 and 13 March.

== Medalists ==
Gold	Silver	Bronze
Deresse Mekonnen; Ethiopia	Abdalaati Iguider; Morocco	Haron Keitany; Kenya

== Records ==
Standing records prior to the 2010 IAAF World Indoor Championships
World record	Hicham El Guerrouj (MAR)	3:31.18	Stuttgart, Germany	2 February 1997
Championship record	Haile Gebrselassie (ETH)	3:33.77	Maebashi, Japan	7 March 1999
World Leading	Deresse Mekonnen (ETH)	3:33.10	Birmingham, Great Britain	20 February 2010
African record	Hicham El Guerrouj (MAR)	3:31.18	Stuttgart, Germany	2 February 1997
Asian record	Belal Mansoor Ali (BHR)	3:36.28	Stockholm, Sweden	20 February 2007
European record	Andrés Manuel Díaz (ESP)	3:33.32	Piraeus, Greece	24 February 1999
North and Central American and Caribbean record	Bernard Lagat (USA)	3:35.23	Birmingham, Great Britain	16 February 2008
Oceanian Record	Nick Willis (NZL)	3:35.80	Birmingham, Great Britain	20 February 2010
South American record	Agberto Guimarães (BRA)	3:42.70	Piraeus, Greece	8 March 1989

== Qualification standards ==
Indoor	Outdoor
3:42.50 or 4:00.00 (Mile)	3:34.50 or 3:52.00 (Mile)

== Schedule ==
Date	Time	Round
March 12, 2010	15:45	Heats
March 13, 2010	17:45	Final

== Results ==
=== Heats ===
Qualification: First 2 in each heat (Q) and the next 3 fastest (q) advance to the final.

Rank	Heat	Name	Nationality	Time	Notes
1	3	Abdalaati Iguider	Morocco	3:37.14	Q
2	3	Mekonnen Gebremedhin	Ethiopia	3:38.90	Q
3	3	Garrett Heath	United States	3:39.25	q, PB
4	3	Mahiedine Mekhissi-Benabbad	France	3:39.63	q
5	2	Deresse Mekonnen	Ethiopia	3:39.66	Q
6	1	Amine Laâlou	Morocco	3:39.96	Q, PB
7	2	Diego Ruiz	Spain	3:40.00	Q
8	2	Haron Keitany	Kenya	3:40.04	q
9	1	Juan Van Deventer	South Africa	3:40.07	Q
10	1	Gideon Gathimba	Kenya	3:40.08	
11	1	Abdelkader Bakhtache	France	3:40.49	
12	3	Adrian Blincoe	New Zealand	3:40.50	PB
13	1	Álvaro Rodríguez	Spain	3:40.96	
14	2	Will Leer	United States	3:42.16	
15	2	Tim Bayley	Great Britain	3:42.57	
16	3	Goran Nava	Serbia	3:42.79	
17	1	Bruno Albuquerque	Portugal	3:44.32	
18	2	Peter van der Westhuizen	South Africa	3:45.76	
19	1	Christian Klein	Germany	3:46.14	
20	3	Christian Obrist	Italy	3:46.33	
21	1	Abubaker Ali Kamal	Qatar	3:46.51	
22	2	Thamer Kamal Ali	Qatar	3:49.64	
23	2	Alex Ngouari-Mouissi	Republic of the Congo	4:02.55	PB
24	2	Ajmal Amirov	Tajikistan	4:03.75	SB
	3	Belal Mansoor Ali	Bahrain	DNS	

=== Final ===
Rank	Name	Nationality	Time	Notes
Gold medal	Deresse Mekonnen	Ethiopia	3:41.86	
Silver medal	Abdalaati Iguider	Morocco	3:41.96	
Bronze medal	Haron Keitany	Kenya	3:42.32	
4	Mekonnen Gebremedhin	Ethiopia	3:42.42	
5	Amine Laâlou	Morocco	3:42.42	
6	Juan Van Deventer	South Africa	3:43.77	
7	Garrett Heath	United States	3:43.81	
8	Mahiedine Mekhissi-Benabbad	France	3:45.22	
9	Diego Ruiz	Spain	3:52.45	
