= 2006 IAAF World Indoor Championships – Men's 1500 metres =

The Men's 1500 metres event at the 2006 IAAF World Indoor Championships was held on March 10–11.

== Medalists ==
Gold	Silver	Bronze
Ivan Heshko; Ukraine	Daniel Kipchirchir Komen; Kenya	Elkanah Angwenyi; Kenya

== Results ==
=== Heats ===
First 2 of each heat (Q) and the next 3 fastest (q) qualified for the final.

Rank	Heat	Name	Nationality	Time	Notes
1	1	Daniel Kipchirchir Komen	Kenya	3:39.64	Q
2	1	Sergio Gallardo	Spain	3:40.04	Q, SB
3	1	Youssef Baba	Morocco	3:40.31	q
4	1	Christopher Lukezic	United States	3:40.97	q, PB
5	2	Ivan Heshko	Ukraine	3:41.49	Q
6	2	Elkanah Angwenyi	Kenya	3:41.63	Q, PB
7	2	Halil Akkas	Turkey	3:41.77	q
8	2	Daham Najim Bashir	Qatar	3:41.87	PB
9	2	Neil Speaight	Great Britain	3:41.99	
10	2	Driss Maazouzi	France	3:42.93	
11	3	James Nolan	Ireland	3:44.67	Q
12	3	Yassine Bensghir	Morocco	3:44.69	Q
13	3	Mounir Yemmouni	France	3:45.26	
14	1	David Freeman	Puerto Rico	3:45.36	
15	1	Colin McCourt	Great Britain	3:45.77	
16	2	Jordan Chipangama	Zambia	3:46.01	NR
17	3	Jason Lunn	United States	3:46.46	
18	2	Christian Neunhauserer	Italy	3:47.90	
19	3	Alexandr Krivchonkov	Russia	3:48.28	
20	3	Arturo Casado	Spain	3:48.87	
21	1	Björn Margeirsson	Iceland	3:49.22	
22	3	Sergey Pakura	Kyrgyzstan	3:50.86	NR
23	3	Ajmal Amirov	Tajikistan	3:51.75	PB

=== Final ===
Rank	Name	Nationality	Time	Notes
1st place, gold medalist(s)	Ivan Heshko	Ukraine	3:42.08	
2nd place, silver medalist(s)	Daniel Kipchirchir Komen	Kenya	3:42.55	
3rd place, bronze medalist(s)	Elkanah Angwenyi	Kenya	3:42.98	
4	Halil Akkas	Turkey	3:43.61	
5	Sergio Gallardo	Spain	3:43.77	
6	James Nolan	Ireland	3:43.98	
7	Christopher Lukezic	United States	3:45.09	
8	Yassine Bensghir	Morocco	3:47.20	
9	Youssef Baba	Morocco	3:49.25	
