= Athletics at the 2006 Commonwealth Games – Men's 1500 metres =

Men's 1500 metres at the Commonwealth Games

The 1500 metres at the 2006 Commonwealth Games as part of the athletics programme were held at the Melbourne Cricket Ground on Friday 24 March 2006 and Saturday 25 March 2006.

The top four runners in each of the two heats automatically qualified for the final. The next four fastest runners from across the heats also qualified. Those 12 runners competed in the final.

== Records ==
World Record	3:26.00	Hicham El Guerrouj	Morocco	Rome, Italy	14 July 1998
Games Record	3:32.16	Filbert Bayi	Tanzania	Christchurch, New Zealand	January 1974

== Medals ==
Gold:	Silver:	Bronze:
Nick Willis, New Zealand	Nathan Brannen, Canada	Mark Fountain, Australia

== Qualification ==
Going into the event, the top ten Commonwealth athletes as ranked by the International Association of Athletics Federations were:

13 March Rank		Athlete	Nation	Games Result	27 March Rank	
Comm.	World	Athlete	Nation	Games Result	Comm.	World
1	1	Daniel Kipchirchir Komen	Kenya	Did not compete	1	1
2	=5	Suleiman Simotwo	Kenya	Did not compete	2	=5
3	7	Alex Kipchirchir	Kenya	Did not compete	3	7
4	11	Laban Rotich	Kenya	Did not compete	4	11
5	14	Elkanah Angwenyi	Kenya	Did not compete	5	14
6	15	William Chirchir	Kenya	Did not compete	6	15
7	17	Michael East	England	Did not compete	8	18
8	20	Kevin Sullivan	Canada	7th	10	22
9	22	Nick McCormick	England	5th	11	23
10	23	Bernard Kiptum	Kenya	Did not compete	=13	=26

- Craig Mottram's 9th in this event took him from outside the top 100 to 17th in the world, and to seventh in the Commonwealth.
- Nick Willis' gold in this event took him from 28th to 21st in the world, and from 12th to ninth in the Commonwealth.
- Mark Fountain's bronze in this event took him from equal 37th to 25th in the world, and from 15th to 12th in the Commonwealth.
- Nathan Brannen's silver in this event took him from 31st to equal 26th in the world, and from outright 13th to equal 13th in the Commonwealth.

== Results ==
All times shown are in minutes.

- Q denotes qualification by place in heat.
- q denotes qualification by overall place.
- DNS denotes did not start.
- DNF denotes did not finish.
- DQ denotes disqualification.
- NR denotes national record.
- GR denotes Games record.
- WR denotes world record.
- PB denotes personal best.
- SB denotes season best.

=== Heats ===
Heat 1 of 2 Date: Friday 24 March 2006 Time: ??:?? AM
Place		Athlete	Nation	Order	Time	Qual.	Record
Heat	Overall	Athlete	Nation	Order	Time	Qual.	Record
1	6	Nick Willis	New Zealand	6	3:40.49	Q	
2	7	Andrew Baddeley	England	1	3:40.60	Q	
3	8	Ismael Kombich	Kenya	10	3:40.68	Q	
4	10	Kevin Sullivan	Canada	5	3:41.25	Q	
5	11	Adrian Blincoe	New Zealand	4	3:41.98	q	
6	12	Jeremy Roff	Australia	11	3:42.04	q	
7	13	Churchill Kipsang	Kenya	7	3:42.84		
8	17	James Thie	Wales	8	3:47.88		
9	20	Alexandros Kalogerogiannis	Cyprus	9	3:55.93		
10	21	Chauncy Master	Malawi	2	3:56.76		PB
-	-	James Mcilroy	Northern Ireland	3	DNS		

Splits
Mark	Athlete	Nation	Time
400 m	Adrian Blincoe	New Zealand	1:00.68
800 m	Adrian Blincoe	New Zealand	1:59.09
1200 m	Andrew Baddeley	England	2:58.38

Heat 2 of 2 Date: Friday 24 March 2006 Time: ??:?? AM
Place		Athlete	Nation	Order	Time	Qual.	Record
Heat	Overall	Athlete	Nation	Order	Time	Qual.	Record
1	1	Craig Mottram	Australia	9	3:38.02	Q	
2	2	Mark Fountain	Australia	2	3:38.31	Q	
3	3	Nathan Brannen	Canada	5	3:38.55	Q	
4	4	Nick McCormick	England	3	3:38.66	Q	
5	5	Paul Hamblyn	New Zealand	7	3:38.83	q	
6	9	Jonathan Komen	Kenya	8	3:41.18	q	
7	14	Jimmy Adar	Uganda	6	3:43.20		
8	15	Lee Merrien	Guernsey	11	3:43.26		
9	16	Moeketsi Mosuhli	Lesotho	4	3:47.36		PB
10	18	Setefano Mika	Samoa	1	3:53.61		PB
11	19	Ansu Sowe	The Gambia	10	3:54.66		

Splits
Mark	Athlete	Nation	Time
400 m	Nick McCormick	England	57.44 s
800 m	Nick McCormick	England	1:58.19
1200 m	Craig Mottram	Australia	2:56.66

Heats Overall Results
Place	Athlete	Nation	Heat	Order	Place	Time	Qual.	Record
1	Craig Mottram	Australia	2	9	1	3:38.02	Q	
2	Mark Fountain	Australia	2	2	2	3:38.31	Q	
3	Nathan Brannen	Canada	2	5	3	3:38.55	Q	
4	Nick McCormick	England	2	3	4	3:38.66	Q	
5	Paul Hamblyn	New Zealand	2	7	5	3:38.83	q	
6	Nick Willis	New Zealand	1	6	1	3:40.49	Q	
7	Andrew Baddeley	England	1	1	2	3:40.60	Q	
8	Ismael Kombich	Kenya	1	10	3	3:40.68	Q	
9	Jonathan Komen	Kenya	2	8	6	3:41.18	q	
10	Kevin Sullivan	Canada	1	5	4	3:41.25	Q	
11	Adrian Blincoe	New Zealand	1	4	5	3:41.98	q	
12	Jeremy Roff	Australia	1	11	6	3:42.04	q	
13	Churchill Kipsang	Kenya	1	7	7	3:42.84		
14	Jimmy Adar	Uganda	2	6	7	3:43.20		
15	Lee Merrien	Guernsey	2	11	8	3:43.26		
16	Moeketsi Mosuhli	Lesotho	2	4	9	3:47.36		PB
17	James Thie	Wales	1	8	8	3:47.88		
18	Setefano Mika	Samoa	2	1	10	3:53.61		PB
19	Ansu Sowe	The Gambia	2	10	11	3:54.66		
20	Alexandros Kalogerogiannis	Cyprus	1	9	9	3:55.93		
21	Chauncy Master	Malawi	1	2	10	3:56.76		PB
-	James Mcilroy	Northern Ireland	1	3	-	DNS		

=== Final ===
Final Date: Friday 25 March 2006 Time: ??:?? PM
Place	Athlete	Nation	Order	Time	Record
1	Nick Willis	New Zealand	1	3:38.49	
2	Nathan Brannen	Canada	11	3:39.20	
3	Mark Fountain	Australia	3	3:39.33	
4	Paul Hamblyn	New Zealand	4	3:39.38	
5	Nick McCormick	England	12	3:39.55	
6	Ismael Kombich	Kenya	7	3:40.92	
7	Kevin Sullivan	Canada	8	3:41.19	
8	Jeremy Roff	Australia	10	3:41.50	
9	Craig Mottram	Australia	6	3:44.37	
10	Adrian Blincoe	New Zealand	9	3:44.88	
11	Jonathan Komen	Kenya	5	3:53.73	
12	Andrew Baddeley	England	2	4:24.14	

Splits
Mark	Athlete	Nation	Time
400 m	Adrian Blincoe	New Zealand	59.89 s
800 m	Nick McCormick	England	2:00.36
1200 m	Nick Willis	New Zealand	2:57.36
