= 2003 European Athletics U23 Championships – Men's 1500 metres =

The men's 1500 metres event at the 2003 European Athletics U23 Championships was held in Bydgoszcz, Poland, at Zawisza Stadion on 18 and 20 July.

== Medalists ==
Gold	Mounir Yemmouni; France
Silver	Xavier Areny; Spain
Bronze	Lorenzo Perrone; Italy

== Results ==
=== Final ===
20 July

Rank	Name	Nationality	Time	Notes
1st place, gold medalist(s)	Mounir Yemmouni	France	3:44.02	
2nd place, silver medalist(s)	Xavier Areny	Spain	3:44.65	
3rd place, bronze medalist(s)	Lorenzo Perrone	Italy	3:45.05	
4	Tom Carter	United Kingdom	3:45.63	
5	Ignacio del Castillo	Spain	3:45.75	
6	Ed Jackson	United Kingdom	3:45.95	
7	Arturo Casado	Spain	3:46.17	
8	Grzegorz Wojtczak	Poland	3:46.28	
9	Aleksandr Krivchonkov	Russia	3:50.73	
10	Mark Ramanchuk	Belarus	3:51.03	
11	Conor Sweeney	Ireland	3:54.73	
12	Guillaume Éraud	France	4:19.35	
	Toni Mohr	Germany	DNF	

=== Heats ===
18 July
Qualified: first 4 in each heat and 4 best to the Final

==== Heat 1 ====
Rank	Name	Nationality	Time	Notes
1	Mark Ramanchuk	Belarus	3:45.83	Q
2	Toni Mohr	Germany	3:45.93	Q
3	Aleksandr Krivchonkov	Russia	3:46.30	Q
4	Ignacio del Castillo	Spain	3:46.44	Q
5	Mounir Yemmouni	France	3:46.98	q
6	Ed Jackson	United Kingdom	3:47.09	Q^{†}
7	Daniel Spitzl	Austria	3:48.29	
8	Colm Rooney	Ireland	3:48.69	
9	Cosimo Caliandro	Italy	3:49.33	
10	Panayiotis Ikonomou	Greece	3:49.42	
11	Dawid Kulik	Poland	3:52.88	

^{†}: Ed Jackson, United Kingdom, in final according to the decision of the Jury of Appeal.

==== Heat 2 ====
Rank	Name	Nationality	Time	Notes
1	Lorenzo Perrone	Italy	3:43.06	Q
2	Xavier Areny	Spain	3:43.72	Q
3	Guillaume Éraud	France	3:43.78	Q
4	Conor Sweeney	Ireland	3:44.03	Q
5	Tom Carter	United Kingdom	3:45.08	q
6	Arturo Casado	Spain	3:46.14	q
7	Grzegorz Wojtczak	Poland	3:46.55	q
8	Mark van der Koelen	Netherlands	3:48.28	
9	Rob Whittle	United Kingdom	3:52.18	
10	Abdel Mahmoudi	France	4:02.74	
	Ioan Zaizan	Romania	DNF	

== Participation ==
According to an unofficial count, 22 athletes from 13 countries participated in the event.

- Austria (1)
- Belarus (1)
- France (3)
- Germany (1)
- Greece (1)
- Ireland (2)
- Italy (2)
- Netherlands (1)
- Poland (2)
- Romania (1)
- Russia (1)
- Spain (3)
- United Kingdom (3)
