= 2008 African Championships in Athletics – Men's 1500 metres =

The men's 1500 metres event at the 2008 African Championships in Athletics was held at the Addis Ababa Stadium on May 3–4.

== Medalists ==
Gold	Silver	Bronze
Haron Keitany; Kenya	Gideon Gathimba; Kenya	Juan van Deventer; South Africa

== Results ==
=== Heats ===
Qualification: First 4 of each heat (Q) and the next 4 fastest (q) qualified for the final.

Rank	Heat	Name	Nationality	Time	Notes
1	1	Deresse Mekonnen	Ethiopia	3:48.12	Q
2	1	Gideon Gathimba	Kenya	3:48.18	Q
3	1	Demma Daba	Ethiopia	3:48.24	Q
4	1	Badr Rassioui	Morocco	3:52.71	Q
5	1	Godfrey Rutayisire	Rwanda	3:53.26	q
6	1	Hlalele Leeto	Lesotho	3:53.53	q
7	1	Chancy Master	Malawi	3:54.61	q
8	2	Haron Keitany	Kenya	3:56.07	Q
9	2	Geoffrey Rono	Kenya	3:56.36	Q
10	2	Juan van Deventer	South Africa	3:56.56	Q
11	2	Deriba Degefa	Ethiopia	3:57.55	Q
12	2	Mahamoud Farah	Djibouti	3:59.14	q
13	2	Aly Abebe Moussa	Mali	4:07.51	
14	2	Ansu Sowe	Gambia	4:15.55	
15	2	Youssouf Houssein Nour	Djibouti	4:16.02	
16	1	Abdi Said Yabeh	Djibouti	4:28.69	
	1	Damiani Chopa	Tanzania	DNS	
	1	Jean Claude Niyonizigiye	Burundi	DNS	
	2	Samwel Mwera	Tanzania	DNS	

=== Final ===
Rank	Name	Nationality	Time	Notes
1st place, gold medalist(s)	Haron Keitany	Kenya	3:43.47	
2nd place, silver medalist(s)	Gideon Gathimba	Kenya	3:43.56	
3rd place, bronze medalist(s)	Juan van Deventer	South Africa	3:43.63	
4	Deresse Mekonnen	Ethiopia	3:44.19	
5	Geoffrey Rono	Kenya	3:44.90	
6	Demma Daba	Ethiopia	3:49.28	
7	Deriba Degefa	Ethiopia	3:51.03	
8	Badr Rassioui	Morocco	3:51.44	
9	Mahamoud Farah	Djibouti	3:53.34	
10	Godfrey Rutayisire	Rwanda	3:54.02	
11	Hlalele Leeto	Lesotho	3:54.93	
12	Chancy Master	Malawi	3:55.73	
