= Johan Cronje =

South African track and field athlete

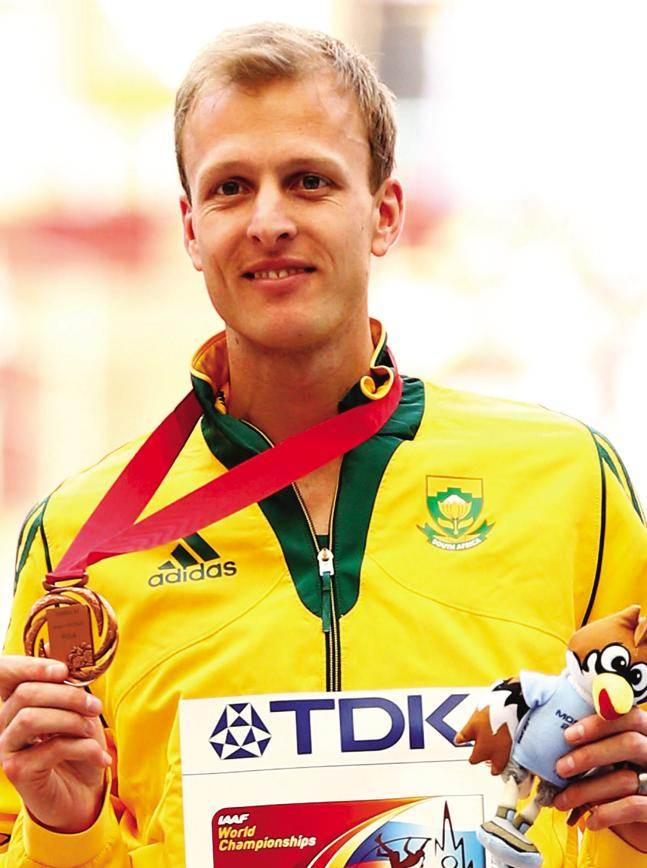
- Cronje in 2013

Personal information
- Born: 13 April 1982 (age 44) Bloemfontein, South Africa

Sport
- Sport: Track and field
Medal record
Representing South Africa
World Championships
Bronze medal – third place	2013 Moscow	1500 m

Johan Tobias Cronje (born 13 April 1982) is a South African track and field athlete who specializes in the 1500 metres event. With a personal best of 3:31.93 he is the current South African record holder in the 1500 metres.

== Competition record ==
Year	Competition	Venue	Position	Event	Notes
Representing South Africa
1999	World Youth Championships	Bydgoszcz, Poland	5th	1500 m	3:46.45
2000	Commonwealth Youth Games	Edinburgh, United Kingdom	1st	800 m	1:51.32
2000	Commonwealth Youth Games	Edinburgh, United Kingdom	2nd	1500 m	4:00.32
2000	World Junior Championships	Santiago, Chile	5th	1500 m	3:42.52
2001	African Junior Championships	Réduit, Mauritius	5th	800 m	1:51.96
2001	African Junior Championships	Réduit, Mauritius	4th	1500 m	3:44.09
2001	African Junior Championships	Réduit, Mauritius	1st	4 × 400 m relay	3:14.14
2001	Universiade	Beijing, China	6th	1500 m	3:45.32
2001	Universiade	Beijing, China	2nd (h)	4 × 400 m relay	3:07.26
2004	African Championships	Brazzaville, Republic of the Congo	5th	1500 m	3:41.83
2004	Olympic Games	Athens, Greece	21st (sf)	1500 m	3:44.41
2005	World Championships	Helsinki, Finland	22nd (sf)	1500 m	3:42.77
2005	Universiade	İzmir, Turkey	4th	1500 m	3:52.16
2006	African Championships	Bambous, Mauritius	6th	1500 m	3:48.08
2007	All-Africa Games	Algiers, Algeria	14th (h)	1500 m	3:46.67
2009	World Championships	Berlin, Germany	41st (h)	1500 m	3:46.45
2010	African Championships	Nairobi, Kenya	9th	1500 m	3:40.25
2012	African Championships	Porto-Novo, Benin	5th	1500 m	3:38.27
2013	World Championships	Moscow, Russia	3rd	1500 m	3:36.83
2014	Commonwealth Games	Glasgow, United Kingdom	4th	1500 m	3:39.65
2014	African Championships	Marrakesh, Morocco	7th	1500 m	3:44.40
2015	World Championships	Beijing, China	8th (sf)	1500 m	3:36.59
2016	African Championships	Durban, South Africa	9th	1500 m	3:45.26

== Personal bests ==
Outdoor

- 800 m – 1:45.64 (Berlin 2013)
- 1000 m – 2:18.56 (Dubnica nad Váhom 2010)
- 1500 m – 3:31.93 (Rieti 2013) NR
- One mile – 3:50.70 (Eugene 2014) NR
- 3000 m – 8:02.14 (Torino 2004)
- 5000 m – 13:59.52 (Germiston 2009)

Indoor

- 1000 m – 2:18.48 (Stockholm 2008)
- 1500 m – 3:37.49 (Karlsruhe 2014)
