= Flavio Seholhe =

Mozambican runner (born 1990)

Flavio Seholhe (born 14 October 1990) is a Mozambican runner who specializes in the 1500 and 3000 metres.

He finished eighth in the 3000 metres at the 2007 World Youth Championships. At the 2012 Ibero-American Championships he won the bronze medal in the 3000 metres and finished seventh in the 1500 metres. He participated at the 2012 African Championships and the 2013 World Championships without reaching the final.

His personal best times are 3:41.70 minutes in the 1500 metres, achieved in June 2016 in Lisbon; and 8:05.64 minutes in the 3000 metres, achieved at the 2012 Ibero-American Championships in Barquisimeto.
