= Mark Fountain =

Australian middle-distance runner

Medal record

Representing Australia

Men's Athletics

Commonwealth Games
Bronze medal – third place	2006 Melbourne	1500 metres

Mark Fountain (born 10 March 1982) is an Australian middle distance runner. He currently lives and trains in Geelong, Victoria and is married to former University of Arkansas All-America runner Erica Sigmont. As of August 27, 2022, Mark Fountain ranked ninth in the Australian men's 1500m all-time rankings with a time of 3:33.68, and tenth in the Australian men's mile all-time rankings with a time of 3:53.24.

== Career ==
In 2008, Fountain was living in Fayetteville, Arkansas whilst being coached by the University of Arkansas coach John McDonnell.

In 2009, Fountain moved back to Australia to be coached by Bruce Scriven and former Olympic Champion Steve Ovett.

After a troublesome two years battling Achilles injuries, Fountain underwent an operation to alleviate his problems and get him on track once again.

Fountain is the General Manager of Supaworld, an indoor family entertainment centre which has four locations Australia wide. He has worked there since 2014.

== Achievements ==
- 8th world Youth Championships Bydgoszcz, Poland(1999)
- 5th World University Championships Daegue, Korea(2003)
- 3rd Commonwealth Games Melbourne, Australia(2006)
- 9th(h) World Championships Osaka, Japan (2007)
- Australian indoor record 1000m: 2.20.3 (2005)
- Australian indoor record mile: 3.54.7 (2005)
- Bronze medalist at 1500 m 2006 Melbourne Commonwealth Games
- Australian Under 18 Champion 1500 m 1999
- Australian Under 20 Champion 1500 m 2001
- Australian Under 20 Champion 3000 m 2001
- Australian Under 20 Champion X-Country 2001
- Australian National Champion 1500 m 2007
- Personal record: 1500 m 3.33.68
