= 2012 African Championships in Athletics – Men's 1500 metres =

The men's 1500 metres at the 2012 African Championships in Athletics was held at the Stade Charles de Gaulle on 30 June and 1 July.

== Medalists ==
Gold	Caleb Mwangangi Ndiku; Kenya
Silver	Ayanleh Souleiman; Djibouti
Bronze	James Magut; Kenya

== Records ==
Standing records prior to the 2012 African Championships in Athletics
World record	Hicham El Guerrouj (MAR)	3:26.00	Rome, Italy	14 July 1998
African record	Hicham El Guerrouj (MAR)	3:26.00	Rome, Italy	14 July 1998
Championship record	Asbel Kiprop (KEN)	3:36.19	Nairobi, Kenya	1 August 2010
Broken records during the 2012 African Championships in Athletics
Championship record	Caleb Mwangangi Ndiku (KEN)	3:35.71	Porto-Novo, Benin	1 July 2012

== Schedule ==
Date	Time	Round
30 June 2012	15:40	Round 1
1 July 2012	16:40	Final

== Results ==
=== Round 1 ===
First 4 in each heat (Q) and 4 best performers (q) advance to the Final.

Rank	Heat	Name	Nationality	Time	Note
1	2	Ayanleh Souleiman	Djibouti	3:40.79	Q
1	2	James Magut	Kenya	3:40.79	Q
3	2	Imad Touil	Algeria	3:41.00	Q
4	2	Zebene Alemayehu	Ethiopia	3:41.19	Q
5	2	Juan van Deventer	South Africa	3:41.37	q
6	2	Fouad El Kam	Morocco	3:41.45	q
7	1	Abednego Miti Chesebe	Kenya	3:42.20	Q
8	1	Caleb Mwangangi Ndiku	Kenya	3:42.21	Q
9	1	Abiyot Abinet	Ethiopia	3:42.34	Q
10	2	Yakdah Ousman	Sudan	3:42.42	q
11	1	Johan Cronje	South Africa	3:42.60	Q
12	1	Peter van der Westhuizen	South Africa	3:42.72	q
13	1	Flavio Seholhe	Mozambique	3:46.08	
14	2	Daniel Gidey	Ethiopia	3:47.24	
15	1	Daniel Nghipandula	Namibia	3:50.13	
16	1	Jaida Khaled	Libya	3:50.72	
17	2	Franck Ngouari Mouissi	Republic of the Congo	3:54.32	
18	1	Aboubakr Ahmed	Uganda	3:57.93	
19	1	Bachir Maman Moutari	Niger	3:58.02	
20	1	Alassan Aboudou	Togo	4:00.40	
21	1	Ali Ahmed Mohamed	Djibouti	4:08.58	
	2	Omar Adam	Libya	DNF	
	1	Taoufik Makhloufi	Algeria	DNS	
	1	Cornelus Bura	Tanzania	DNS	
	2	Emile Zangre	Burkina Faso	DNS	
	2	Senay Amlesom	Eritrea	DNS	
	2	Abdoulaye Alassani	Togo	DNS	

=== Final ===
Rank	Name	Nationality	Time	Note
1st place, gold medalist(s)	Caleb Mwangangi Ndiku	Kenya	3:35.71	CR
2nd place, silver medalist(s)	Ayanleh Souleiman	Djibouti	3:36.34	
3rd place, bronze medalist(s)	James Magut	Kenya	3:36.35	
4	Abednego Miti Chesebe	Kenya	3:36.76	
5	Johan Cronje	South Africa	3:38.27	
6	Abiyot Abinet	Ethiopia	3:38.46	
7	Fouad El Kam	Morocco	3:39.90	
8	Juan van Deventer	South Africa	3:40.80	
9	Imad Touil	Algeria	3:40.95	
10	Zebene Alemayehu	Ethiopia	3:41.00	
11	Peter van der Westhuizen	South Africa	3:43.40	
12	Yakdah Ousman	Sudan	3:45.65	
