= 2004 African Championships in Athletics – Men's 1500 metres =

The men's 1500 metres event at the 2004 African Championships in Athletics was held in Brazzaville, Republic of the Congo on July 15.

== Results ==
Rank	Name	Nationality	Time	Notes
1st place, gold medalist(s)	Paul Korir	Kenya	3:39.48	
2nd place, silver medalist(s)	Peter Roko Ashak	Sudan	3:41.31	
3rd place, bronze medalist(s)	Yassine Bensghir	Morocco	3:41.49	
4	Ali Maataoui	Morocco	3:41.53	
5	Johan Cronje	South Africa	3:41.83	
6	Nebse Seyfu	Ethiopia	3:42.22	
7	Clyde Colenso	South Africa	3:43.64	
8	Francis Munthali	Malawi	3:47.54	
9	Abdoulaye Abdelkerim	Chad	3:56.83	
10	Damien Miakabana	Republic of the Congo	4:02.69	
11	Leonard Ntala Meso	Democratic Republic of the Congo	4:07.91	
12	Abdi Said Yabeh	Djibouti	4:28.70	
