= Dexter Faulk =

American hurdler

Medal record

Men's athletics

Representing the United States

NACAC Championships
Gold medal – first place	2007 Bridgetown	110 m hurdles

Dexter Faulk (born April 14, 1984) is an American male former track and field hurdler who specialized in the 110-meter hurdles. He holds personal records of 13.13 seconds outdoors and 7.40 seconds in the indoor 60-meter hurdles event, which ranks him twelfth on the all-time lists as of 2018. He was a gold medallist at the 2007 NACAC Championships.

== Career ==
From Atlanta, he began taking part in the hurdles in 10th grade at high school. Faulk attended Barton Community College and went undefeated in the hurdles over a 2-year period at NJCAA-level. He competed internationally at a young age, coming sixth at the 2001 World Youth Championships in Athletics and taking silver at the 2003 Pan American Junior Athletics Championships.

He began to rank in the global elite from 2007, with a personal best of 13.34 seconds giving him his first top 25 global ranking. He won the gold medal at the first NACAC Senior Championships He recorded a time of 13.40 seconds in 2008 but did not compete internationally. His strongest season came in 2009 when he took two victories on the 2009 IAAF Golden League circuit: he improved his personal best multiple times, winning with 13.21 seconds at the Josef Odložil Memorial, 13.18 seconds at the ISTAF Berlin, then a lifetime best of 13.14 seconds at the Meeting Areva in Paris. The latter time made him the number one ranked athlete in the world, but he hit a hurdle at the 2009 USA Outdoor Track and Field Championships, which meant he was not selected for the World Championships team. He did however end the season with a silver medal at the 2009 IAAF World Athletics Final.

In the 2010 and 2011 seasons his form wavered and his best run of this period was 13.35 seconds in Padua. He had a resurgence in 2012, starting with a 60-meter hurdles time of 7.40 seconds at the USA Indoor Track and Field Championships. This was a world leading time which moved him into the all-time top twelve on the global lists. However, he again faltered in the national championships and failed to qualify for the IAAF World Indoor Championships. Outdoors, he managed to match his personal record with a time of 13.13 seconds to win at the Golden Spike Ostrava meet. He reached the final at the 2012 United States Olympic Trials, but a sixth-place finish left him did not give him an Olympic berth. He competed sparingly thereafter before retiring and focused on coaching instead.

== International competitions ==
Year	Competition	Venue	Position	Event	Notes
2001	World Youth Championships	Debrecen, Hungary	6th	110 m hurdles	
2003	Pan American Junior Championships	Bridgetown, Barbados	2nd	110 m hurdles	13.82
2007	NACAC Championships	San Salvador, El Salvador	1st	110 m hurdles	13.35
2009	World Athletics Final	Thessaloniki, Greece	2nd	110 m hurdles	13.26

== Circuit wins ==
- 2009 IAAF Golden League
  - ISTAF Berlin
  - Meeting Areva
