= James Kiplagat Magut =

Kenyan middle-distance runner

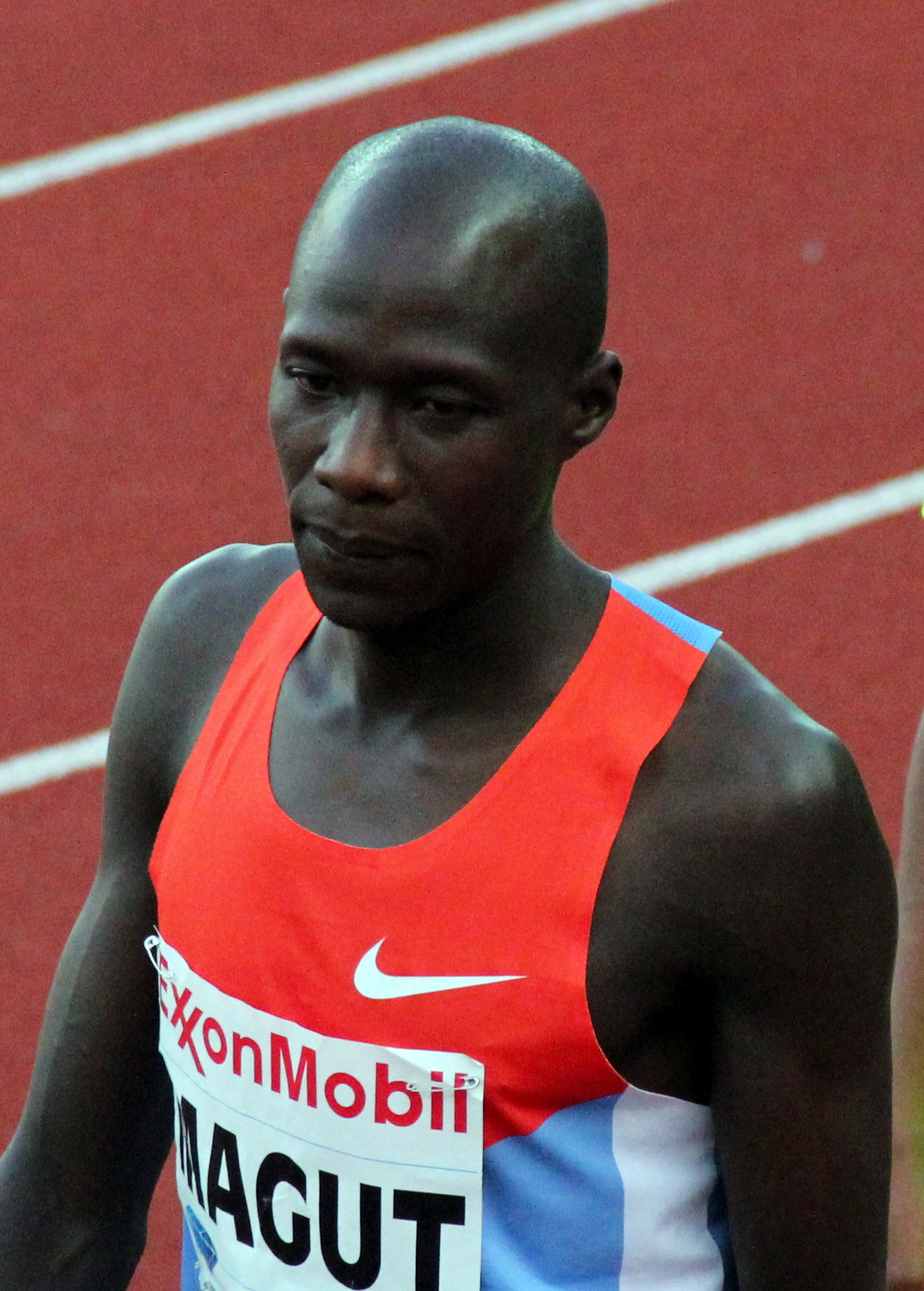
- Magut at the 2012 Bislett Games

Medal record

Men's athletics

Representing Kenya

African Championships
Bronze medal – third place	2012 Porto-Novo	1500 m

Commonwealth Games
Gold medal – first place	2014 Glasgow	1500 m
Silver medal – second place	2010 New Delhi	1500 m

World Relays
Gold medal – first place	2014 Nassau	4×1500 m

James Kiplagat Magut (born 20 July 1990) is a Kenyan middle-distance runner who specialises in the 1500 metres. He has a personal best of 3:30.61 minutes for the event as well as a best of 3:50.68 minutes for the mile run.

He won his first medals as a teenager, taking second at the 2008 World Junior Championships in Athletics and winning the 2009 African Junior Athletics Championships. His first senior podium finish soon followed: on his major international debut at the 2010 Commonwealth Games, he claimed the silver medal. He was the bronze medallist at the 2012 African Championships in Athletics.

Magut was part of the world record-setting 4×1500 metres relay team that won the gold medal at the 2014 IAAF World Relays.

== Career ==
Born in Nandi County, Magut gained his first national selection after a runner-up finish in the 1500 m at the Kenyan junior championships. At the 2008 World Junior Championships in Athletics, he seemed set to win the title but Algeria's Imad Touil narrowly beat him into second place by a tenth of a second. Following this he performed in Europe for the first time, finishing in the top ten at the Rieti Meeting and Hanžeković Memorial. The next year, the eighteen-year-old runner won the Kenyan high school championship, holding off Nixon Chepseba. He topped the podium at the 2009 African Junior Athletics Championships. He competed infrequently the year after, but in spite of this won his first major medal in the form of a silver behind Silas Kiplagat at the 2010 Commonwealth Games.

Magut missed the 2011 season due to a knee injury, but returned in May 2012 with a win at the Kenyan Armed Forces Championships, then his first sub-four-minute mile to win at the Prefontaine Classic meeting. He set a new best of 3:50.68 for the distance at the Dream Mile at the Bislett Games a week later – this was only enough for sixth at the higher calibre event, but still ranked him the eighth fastest runner that year. He ran a 1500 m personal best of 3:34.60 minutes to place second at the national championship race, but faltered at the Kenyan Olympic trials, coming in sixth place and failing to break 3:40 minutes. This run still earned him a spot on the team for the 2012 African Championships in Athletics, where he took the bronze medal, half a second behind the winner Caleb Mwangangi. Magut came third at the British Grand Prix (his first top three placing on the IAAF Diamond League) and peaked for the season at the Hanžeković Memorial, winning with a personal best of 3:33.31 minutes.

At the start of his 2013 season, he won at the Melbourne Track Classic, then in the Prefontaine Classic mile. He was third at the Bislett Games and was runner-up at the national championships. He did not finish in the top three at the Kenyan World Championships trials and failed to finish at the Herculis and DN Galan 2013 IAAF Diamond League meets. His best run that year came at the London Grand Prix, where he was third in the mile in a near personal best of 3:50.93 minutes, ranking him eighth that year for the distance.

Magut had a string of victories in Australia in early 2014, winning in Melbourne, Perth and Sydney. A personal best for the 1500 m followed at the Doha Diamond League meet, although his time of 3:30.61 minutes placed him fifth in the quick race. These performances earned him a place on the Kenyan 4×1500 metres relay team for the inaugural 2014 IAAF World Relays. Running alongside Silas Kiplagat, Asbel Kiprop and Collins Cheboi, the group won the gold medal in a world record-breaking time of 14:22.22 minutes – a fourteen-second improvement.

== Personal bests ==
- 1000 metres – 2:19.72 minutes (2013)
- 1500 metres – 3:30.61 minutes (2014)
- 1500 metres (indoors) – 3:48.65 minutes (2014)
- Mile run – 3:50.68 minutes (2012)

== International competition record ==
Year	Competition	Venue	Position	Event	Notes
2008	World Junior Championships	Bydgoszcz, Poland	2nd	1500 metres	3:47.51
2009	African Junior Championships	Bambous, Mauritius	1st	1500 metres	3:37.05
2010	Commonwealth Games	New Delhi, India	2nd	1500 metres	3:42.27
2012	African Championships	Porto-Novo, Benin	3rd	1500 metres	3:36.35
2014	IAAF World Relays	Nassau, Bahamas	1st	4 × 1500 m relay	14:22.22 min WR
2014	Commonwealth Games	Glasgow, Scotland	1st	1500 metres	3:39.31
