= Yassine Bensghir =

Moroccan middle-distance runner

Yassine Bensghir ياسين بنصغير
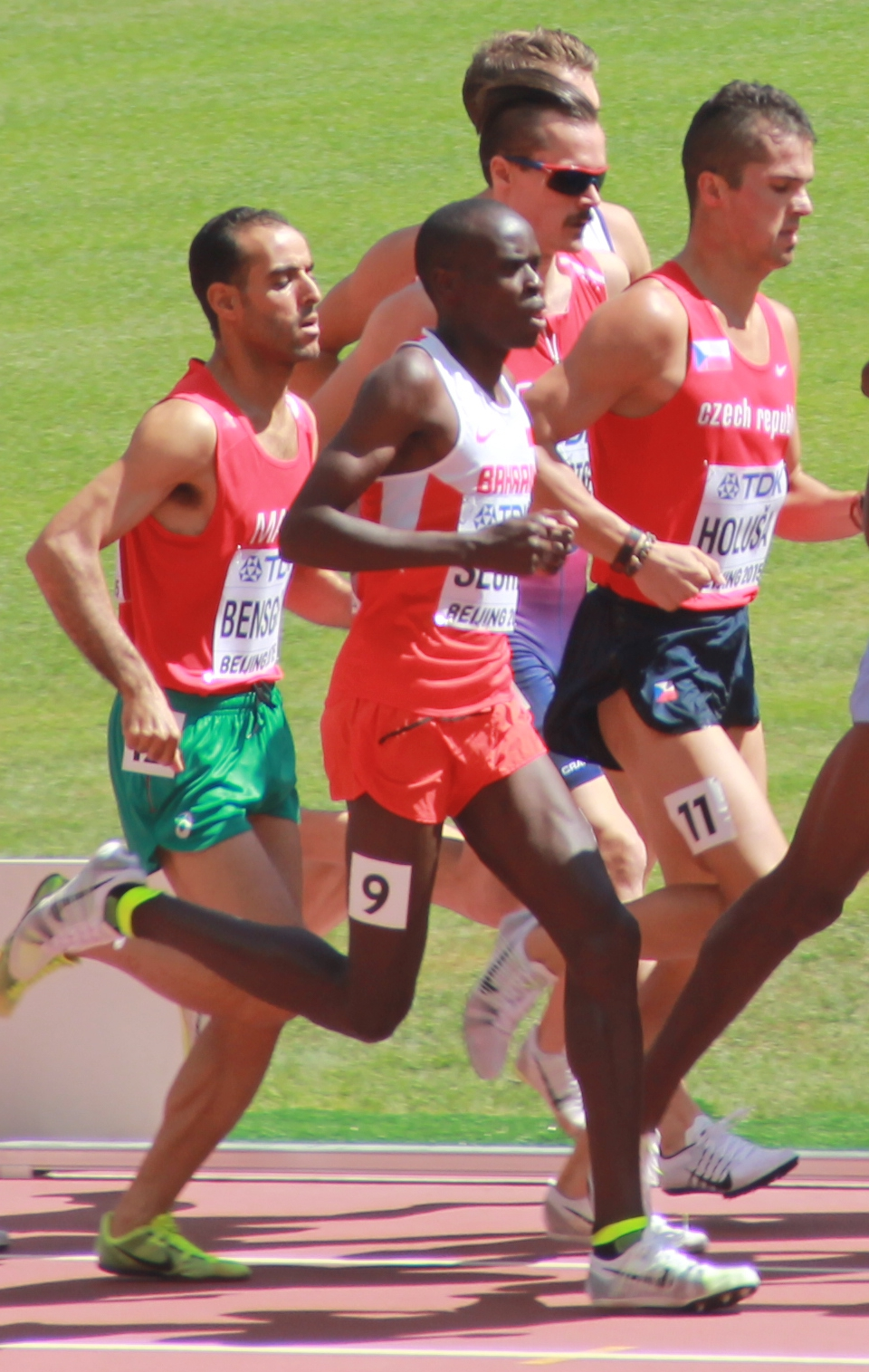
- Bensghir (left) in 2015

Medal record

Men's athletics

Representing Morocco

African Championships
Bronze medal – third place	2004 Brazzaville	1500 m

Mediterranean Games
Silver medal – second place	Mersin 2013	1500 m

Yassine Bensghir (Arabic: ياسين بنصغير; born 3 January 1983) is a Moroccan middle-distance runner who specializes in the 1500 metres. He was born in Rabat.

His personal best time over the distance is 3:33.04 minutes, achieved in July 2007 in Monaco.

The IAAF announced in July 2016 that Bensghir had been banned from competition for 4 years after abnormalities had been detected in his biological passport. His results from 7 June 2014 onwards were annulled. The ban ends 11 April 2020.

== Competition record ==
Year	Competition	Venue	Position	Event	Notes
Representing Morocco
2001	African Junior Championships	Réduit, Mauritius	7th	1500 m	3:51.62
2002	World Junior Championships	Kingston, Jamaica	1st	1500 m	3:40.72
2004	African Championships	Brazzaville, Republic of the Congo	9th (h)	800 m	1:50.00
2004	African Championships	Brazzaville, Republic of the Congo	3rd	1500 m	3:41.49
2005	World Championships	Helsinki, Finland	12th	1500 m	3:50.19
2005	Jeux de la Francophonie	Niamey, Niger	1st	800 m	1:47.11
2005	Jeux de la Francophonie	Niamey, Niger	1st	1500 m	3:46.58
2006	World Indoor Championships	Moscow, Russia	8th	1500 m	3:47.20
2007	World Championships	Osaka, Japan	22nd (sf)	800 m	1:48.04
2008	Olympic Games	Beijing, China	19th (h)	800 m	1:46.88
2013	Mediterranean Games	Mersin, Turkey	2nd	1500 m	3:36.42
2014	African Championships	Marrakesh, Morocco	6th (DQ)	1500 m	3:44.00 (DQ)
2015	World Championships	Beijing, China	21st (sf)(DQ)	1500 m	3:44.95 (DQ)
