= Antar Zerguelaïne =

Algerian middle-distance runner

Personal information
- Nationality: Algerian
- Born: 4 January 1985 (age 41) Jijel, Algeria

Sport
- Sport: Track and field
- Event: 1500 m

Achievements and titles
- Personal bests: 800 m: 1:46.56 (2005); 1500 m: 3:31.95 (2005)
Medal record
Men's Athletics
Representing Algeria
Islamic Solidarity Games
Bronze medal – third place	2005 Mecca	Men's 1500 m
All-Africa Games
Silver medal – second place	2007 Algiers	Men's 1500 m
Mediterranean Games
Gold medal – first place	2009 Pescara	Men's 1500 m

Antar Zerguelaïne (born 4 January 1985 in Jijel, Algeria) is an Algerian middle-distance runner who specializes in the 1500 metres.

== Competition record ==
Year	Competition	Venue	Position	Event	Notes
Representing Algeria
2003	African Junior Championships	Garoua, Cameroon	6th	1500 m	3:54.0
2004	World Junior Championships	Grosseto, Italy	5th	1500 m	3:43.19
2005	Islamic Solidarity Games	Mecca, Saudi Arabia	3rd	1500 m	3:47.90
2005	World Championships	Helsinki, Finland	29th (h)	1500 m	3:43.02
2005	World Athletics Final	Monte Carlo, Monaco	7th	1500 m	3:36.34
2007	All-Africa Games	Algiers, Algeria	2nd	1500 m	3:39.04
2007	World Championships	Osaka, Japan	6th	1500 m	3:35.29
2008	Olympic Games	Beijing, China	19th (h)	1500 m	3:40.64
2009	Mediterranean Games	Pescara, Italy	1st	1500 m	3:37.49
2009	World Championships	Berlin, Germany	17th (h)	1500 m	3:42.37

=== Personal bests ===
- 800 metres - 1:46.56 min (2005)
- 1500 metres - 3:31.95 min (2005)
