= 2009 IAAF Golden League =

Athletics competition series

The 2009 Golden League is the 12th edition of the IAAF's annual series of six athletics meets, held across Europe, with athletes having the chance to win the Golden League Jackpot of $1 million.

== Programme ==
Meet calendar
Date	Meet	Stadium	City	Country
14 June	ISTAF Berlin	Olympiastadion	Berlin	Germany
3 July	Bislett Games	Bislett Stadium	Oslo	Norway
10 July	Golden Gala	Stadio Olimpico	Rome	Italy
17 July	Meeting Areva	Stade de France	Saint-Denis	France
28 August	Weltklasse Zürich	Letzigrund	Zürich	Switzerland
4 September	Memorial Van Damme	King Baudouin Stadium	Brussels	Belgium

Jackpot events
Men	100 m	400 m	3000 m / 5000 m	110 m hurdles	Javelin throw
Women	100 m	400 m	100 m hurdles	High jump	Pole vault

== Results ==
=== Men ===
Event	ISTAF Berlin	Bislett Games Oslo	Golden Gala Rome	Meeting Areva Paris	Weltklasse Zürich	Memorial van Damme Brussels
100 m	Daniel Bailey (ATG); 10.03	Asafa Powell (JAM); 10.07	Tyson Gay (USA); 9.77	Usain Bolt (JAM); 9.79	Usain Bolt (JAM); 9.81	Asafa Powell (JAM); 9.90
200 m	—	—	—	—	—	Usain Bolt (JAM); 19.57
400 m	Chris Brown (BAH); 45.61	Renny Quow (TRI); 45.18	Chris Brown (BAH); 44.81	Jeremy Wariner (USA); 45.28	LaShawn Merritt (USA); 44.21	Jeremy Wariner (USA); 44.94
800 m	—	Yuriy Borzakovskiy (RUS); 1:44.42	Alfred Kirwa Yego (KEN); 1:45.23	Ismail Ahmed Ismail (SUD); 1:45.85	David Rudisha (KEN); 1:43.52	David Rudisha (KEN); 1:45.80
1500 m	Augustine Choge (KEN); 3:29.47	Collins Cheboi (KEN); 3:36.24	Asbel Kiprop (KEN); 3:31.20	—	Augustine Choge (KEN); 3:33.38	—
Mile run	—	Deresse Mekonnen (ETH); 3:48.95	—	—	—	—
3000 m / 5000 m	—	Richard Bartale (KEN); 7:50.58	—	Kenenisa Bekele (ETH); 7:28.64	—	—
3000 m / 5000 m	Kenenisa Bekele (ETH); 13:00.76	Kenenisa Bekele (ETH); 13:04.87	Kenenisa Bekele (ETH); 12:56.23	—	Kenenisa Bekele (ETH); 12:52.32	Kenenisa Bekele (ETH); 12:55.33
110 m hurdles	Dexter Faulk (USA); 13.18	Antwon Hicks (USA); 13.41	Dayron Robles (CUB); 13.17	Dexter Faulk (USA); 13.14	Dwight Thomas (JAM); 13.16	Ryan Brathwaite (BAR); 13.30
400 m hurdles	—	—	Kerron Clement (USA); 48.09	—	—	—
3000 m steeplechase	—	—	—	Mahiedine Mekhissi-Benabbad (FRA); 8:13.23	Ezekiel Kemboi (KEN); 8:04.44	Paul Koech (KEN); 8:04.05
4 × 100 m relay	Great Britain (GBR); 38.52	—	—	—	Jamaica (JAM); 37.70	—
4 × 1500 m relay	—	—	—	—	—	Kenya (KEN); 14:36.23 WR
Long jump	Godfrey Khotso Mokoena (RSA); 8.33	—	Dwight Phillips (USA); 8.61	—	—	—
Pole vault	—	—	—	Renaud Lavillenie (FRA); 5.70	—	—
Triple jump	—	—	—	Phillips Idowu (GBR); 17.17	Nelson Évora (POR); 17.38	—
Discus throw	Gerd Kanter (EST); 67.88	—	—	—	—	—
Javelin throw	Tero Pitkämäki (FIN); 86.53	Tero Pitkämäki (FIN); 84.63	Andreas Thorkildsen (NOR); 87.46	Andreas Thorkildsen (NOR); 88.03	Andreas Thorkildsen (NOR); 91.28	Tero Pitkämäki (FIN); 86.23

=== Women ===
Event	ISTAF Berlin	Bislett Games Oslo	Golden Gala Rome	Meeting Areva Paris	Weltklasse Zürich	Memorial van Damme Brussels
100 m	Kerron Stewart (JAM); 11.00	Kerron Stewart (JAM); 10.99	Kerron Stewart (JAM); 10.75	Kerron Stewart (JAM); 10.99	Carmelita Jeter (USA); 10.86	Carmelita Jeter (USA); 10.88
400 m	Sanya Richards (USA); 49.57	Sanya Richards (USA); 49.23	Sanya Richards (USA); 49.46	Sanya Richards (USA); 49.34	Sanya Richards (USA); 48.94	Sanya Richards (USA); 48.83
800 m	—	Claire Gibson (GBR); 2:01.42	Maggie Vessey (USA); 2:00.13	Anna Willard (USA); 1:58.80	—	Anna Willard (USA); 1:59.14
1500 m	—	—	Maryam Yusuf Jamal (BHR); 3:56.55	—	Maryam Yusuf Jamal (BHR); 3:59.15	—
2000 m	—	—	—	—	—	Gelete Burika (ETH); 5:30.19
5000 m	—	Meseret Defar (ETH); 14:36.38	—	—	—	—
3000 m steeplechase	—	Ruth Bosibori (KEN); 9:18.65	Gulnara Samitova-Galkina (RUS); 9:11.58	—	—	—
100 m hurdles	Damu Cherry (USA); 12.76	Damu Cherry (USA); 12.68	Dawn Harper (USA); 12.55	Dawn Harper (USA); 12.68	Brigitte Foster-Hylton (JAM); 12.46	Brigitte Foster-Hylton (JAM); 12.48
400 m hurdles	—	—	Anna Jesień (POL); 54.31	Anna Jesień (POL); 54.37	—	—
4 × 100 m relay	Great Britain (GBR); 43.18	—	—	—	—	—
High jump	Ariane Friedrich (GER); 2.06	Blanka Vlašić (CRO); 2.00	Antonietta Di Martino (ITA); 2.00	Blanka Vlašić (CRO); 1.99	Blanka Vlašić (CRO); 2.01	Blanka Vlašić (CRO); 2.00
Triple jump	—	—	—	—	—	Yamilé Aldama (SUD); 14.27
Shot put	Nadine Kleinert (GER); 19.39	—	—	—	—	—
Pole vault	Yelena Isinbayeva (RUS); 4.83	Yelena Isinbayeva (RUS); 4.71	Yelena Isinbayeva (RUS); 4.85	Yelena Isinbayeva (RUS); 4.65	Yelena Isinbayeva (RUS); 5.06 WR	Yelena Isinbayeva (RUS); 4.70
