= Running Channel =

Running community channel

The Running Channel

YouTube information
- Channel: @runningchannel
- Years active: 2018–present
- Subscribers: 810 thousand
- Views: 128.9 million
- Last updated: 11 November 2025
- Website: therunningchannel.com

The Running Channel is a popular digital media platform dedicated to running, fitness, and related lifestyle content. Established in 2018, the channel produces videos and articles aimed at runners of all levels, from beginners to ultramarathoners. It has gained a substantial following on YouTube and other social media platforms, providing running tips, gear reviews, training plans, and inspirational stories.

== History ==
Founded in 2018 by Andy Baddeley and Adam Tranter, The Running Channel was created with a plan to offer engaging and informative content for runners of all levels. Initially operating as a project under Fusion Media, the channel became an independent entity in 2019. In 2020, Mike Whitehead joined The Running Channel as a director.

The Running Channel quickly grew in popularity due to its relatable hosts, expert advice, and a welcoming approach to all runners.

== Hosts and contributors ==
The channel features a diverse team of hosts and contributors, including experienced runners, coaches, and fitness experts, but also beginners and casual runners. Notable personalities include:

Andy Baddeley: former professional runner, two-times finalist in 1500 m Olympic Games.
Sarah Hartley: discovered running during university studies.
Rick Kelsey: returning to running after osteotomy.
James Dunn: long-distance runner, coming to running from weight loss.
Tom Dunn: slow runner, struggling with motivation.
Jess Furness: fast, enthusiastic runner.
Anna Harding: returning to running postpartum.
