= Paul Korir =

Kenyan middle distance runner (born 1977)

Personal information
- Born: July 15, 1977 (age 48)
Medal record
Men's athletics
Representing Kenya
World Indoor Championships
Gold medal – first place	2004 Budapest	1500 m
All-Africa Games
Gold medal – first place	2003 Abuja	1500 m
African Championships
Gold medal – first place	2004 Brazzaville	1500 m

Paul Kipketer Korir (born July 15, 1977, in Kipkoror, near Lessos, Nandi District in the Rift Valley Province) is a middle distance athlete from Kenya.

== Biography ==
He graduated from Kilibwoni High School in Nandi District in 1996. He has started running seriously a year earlier. In 2000 he finished 2nd at an athletics meeting in Kakamega and was spotted by Moses Tanui and was signed by Fila club managed by Federico Rosa. In 2001 he switched to KIM club. He made an international breakthrough in 2003, winning gold medal at the All-Africa Games and 2003 World Athletics Final.

In the run up to the 2004 Summer Olympics in Athens, Greece he was ranked world number three behind Hicham El Guerrouj and Bernard Lagat which would have given him a good medal chance had he not been dropped from the Kenyan Olympics team after finishing only fourth in his country's Olympic trials.

Korir used to attend the PACE Sports Management training camp in Kaptagat. He is managed by Ricky Simms and coached by Jimmy Beauttah. He is married and has a daughter born in 2002.

He is not to be confused with Paul Atudonyang Korir a Kenyan marathon runner.

== Achievements ==
1500 m Major achievements

- 2003
  - 2003 All-Africa Games - Abuja, Nigeria.
    - gold medal
  - 2003 World Athletics Final
    - winner
- 2004
  - 2004 IAAF World Indoor Championships - Budapest, Hungary.
    - gold medal
  - 2004 African Championships - Brazzaville, Republic of the Congo.
    - gold medal
