= 2006 European Athletics Championships – Men's 5000 metres =

Men's 5000 metres at the European Athletics Championships

The men's 5000 metres at the 2006 European Athletics Championships were held at the Ullevi on August 10 and August 13.

Farah took the lead with 1000 m to go and stretched the field. A sprint to line resulted in España over taking Farah metres from the line. A quick finish by Higuero moved him into third over Turkey's Halil Akkaş.

== Medalists ==
Gold	Silver	Bronze
Jesús España; Spain	Mo Farah; United Kingdom	Juan Carlos Higuero; Spain

== Schedule ==
Date	Time	Round
August 10, 2006	17:40	Semifinals
August 13, 2006	16:40	Final

== Results ==
KEY:	q	Fastest non-qualifiers	Q	Qualified	NR	National record	PB	Personal best	SB	Seasonal best

=== Semifinals ===
First 5 in each heat (Q) and the next 5 fastest (q) advance to the Final.

Rank	Heat	Name	Nationality	Time	Notes
1	2	Khalid Zoubaa	France	13:46.32	Q
2	2	Eduard Bordukov	Russia	13:46.72	Q
3	2	Mo Farah	United Kingdom	13:46.77	Q
4	2	Monder Rizki	Belgium	13:47.51	Q
5	1	Halil Akkaş	Turkey	13:48.79	Q
6	2	Tom Compernolle	Belgium	13:49.14	Q
7	1	Gert-Jan Liefers	Netherlands	13:49.73	Q
8	2	Henrik Skoog	Sweden	13:49.99	q
9	1	Alistair Cragg	Ireland	13:50.12	Q
10	1	Pablo Villalobos	Spain	13:51.17	q
11	1	Jesús España	Spain	13:52.33	Q
12	1	Juan Carlos Higuero	Spain	13:52.66	Q
13	2	Nick McCormick	United Kingdom	13:52.87	q
14	1	Tom Van Hooste	Belgium	13:53.50	q
15	1	Marius Bakken	Norway	13:56.84	q
16	1	Martin Steinbauer	Austria	13:59.17	
17	1	Barnabás Bene	Hungary	14:08.16	SB
18	1	Chris Thompson	United Kingdom	14:10.27	
	2	Arne Gabius	Germany		DNF
	1	Christian Belz	Switzerland		DNS
	2	Serhiy Lebid	Ukraine		DNS

=== Final ===
Rank	Name	Nationality	Time	Notes
1st place, gold medalist(s)	Jesús España	Spain	13:44.70	
2nd place, silver medalist(s)	Mo Farah	United Kingdom	13:44.79	
3rd place, bronze medalist(s)	Juan Carlos Higuero	Spain	13:46.48	
4	Halil Akkaş	Turkey	13:46.53	
5	Khalid Zoubaa	France	13:55.09	
6	Henrik Skoog	Sweden	13:56.34	
7	Pablo Villalobos	Spain	13:58.25	
8	Gert-Jan Liefers	Netherlands	13:58.70	
9	Eduard Bordukov	Russia	14:00.30	
10	Tom Compernolle	Belgium	14:03.37	
11	Monder Rizki	Belgium	14:04.96	
12	Nick McCormick	United Kingdom	14:06.18	
13	Tom Van Hooste	Belgium	14:15.32	
	Marius Bakken	Norway		DNF
	Alistair Cragg	Ireland		DNF
