= Juan van Deventer =

South African middle-distance runner

Medal record

Men's athletics

Representing South Africa

African Championships
Bronze medal – third place	2008 Addis Ababa	1500 m

Juan Pierre van Deventer (born 26 March 1983) is a South African middle-distance runner, who represented his country at the 2008 Summer Olympics and the 2010 IAAF World Indoor Championships.

He won the bronze medal in the 1500 metres at the 2008 African Championships in Athletics. Later that year, he became the first South African man to reach the Olympic 1500 m final at the 2008 Beijing Olympics, where he finished sixth. He has a 1500 m personal best of 3:34.46 and he is also the South African record holder in the 3000 metres with a time of 7:41.06 set in Stockholm in 2008.

Juan finished second in his indoor debut at the International PSD Bank Meeting in Düsseldorf, Germany in February 2010 also setting a new national 1500 m record of 3 min 37.25 sec – a record previously set by Sydney Maree 31 years ago in a time of 3 min 38.2 sec. He reached the 1500 m final at the 2010 World Indoor Championships and finished sixth.

In October 2022, van Deventer and his family emigrated to Australia. They travelled to the country on a sponsored visa after his wife was offered work as a teacher at an early learning centre in the regional city of Rockhampton, Queensland where he also obtained employment as a financial advisor. In May 2023, van Deventer won the half marathon event at the Rocky River Run.

== Competition record ==
Year	Competition	Venue	Position	Event	Notes
Representing South Africa
2005	Universiade	İzmir, Turkey	7th	800 m	1:48.50
2006	African Championships	Bambous, Mauritius	9th	1500 m	3:50.60
2007	All-Africa Games	Algiers, Algeria	7th	1500 m	3:40.48
2007	Universiade	Bangkok, Thailand	12th	1500 m	3:55.18
2008	African Championships	Addis Ababa, Ethiopia	3rd	1500 m	3:43.63
2008	Olympic Games	Beijing, China	6th	1500 m	3:34.77
2010	World Indoor Championships	Doha, Qatar	6th	1500 m	3:43.77
2010	African Championships	Nairobi, Kenya	6th	1500 m	3:37.99
2012	African Championships	Porto-Novo, Benin	8th	1500 m	3:40.80
