= Chris Lukezic =

American middle-distance runner

Christopher Lukezic
Personal information
- Nationality: American
- Born: April 24, 1984 (age 42) Auburn, Washington, U.S.

Sport
- Sport: Track
- Events: 1500 meters, Mile
- College team: Georgetown

Achievements and titles
- Personal bests: 800 meters: 1:47.75; 1500 meters: 3:33.28; Mile: 3:54.46; 3000 meters: 7:49.05

Christopher Lukezic (born April 24, 1984), known simply as Chris Lukezic, is an American retired middle distance runner. He represented the United States in the men's 1500-meter at the 2005 World Championships in Athletics and the men's 1500-meter at the 2006 IAAF World Indoor Championships.

== Running career ==
=== High school ===
Lukezic attended Auburn High School in Auburn, Washington and competed in cross country and track & field. In track, Lukezic became known as one of the top distance runners in the nation. While in high school Lukezic won the prestigious Millrose Games High School Mile. Lukezic would also win the 1600 meters at the Washington state 4A Track & Field Championships, and the Golden West Invitational. At the Adidas Outdoor Championships, Lukezic and team mates Tyler Campbell, Mike Dixon, and Adam Vogt set the National Record for the high school 4 × 800 m relay with a time of 7:32.89, and then ran the second fastest high school Distance Medley Relay of all time, anchored by Lukezic's 4:03.6 1600m leg. Lukezic then won the USATF Junior National title in the 1500m with a time of 3:47.32. He finished 11th at the World Junior Championships with a time of 3:46.01. He was also selected as the Nike Athlete of the Year.

=== Collegiate ===
Lukezic attended Georgetown University for three years before turning pro and signing an endorsement contract with Reebok. In his time at Georgetown, he earned All-American honors five times. Once for cross country (2003) and four in track: Outdoor 1500m (2003, 2005); Indoor Distance Medley Relay (2004); and Indoor 3000m (2004). He also won a second Junior National title during his freshman year at Georgetown.

=== Post-collegiate ===
Since his time at Georgetown, Lukezic has a number of career highlights. In 2004, Lukezic finished 4th at the United States Olympic Trials in the 1500m. In 2005, he finished 2nd at the United States Track & Field Outdoor Championships in the 1500m. That summer he went on to compete at the World Championships in Helsinki, Finland where he missed the final by one spot. In 2006 he was the United States Indoor Track & Field Champion in the 1500m, and finished 4th at the U.S. Outdoor Championships, and was ranked #2 in the 1500m in the United States, by Track and Field News. 2006 also saw Lukezic a member of the United States Distance Medley Relay team that set a National Record, with a time of 9:15.63, a time that was also the second best in the world.

2006 was arguably Lukezic's most impressive year as he finished 7th at the World Indoor Championships in Moscow and later went on to run 3:33.28 for the 1500m, one of the top-10 fastest times ever posted by an American. During the fall/winter of 2006 Lukezic also appeared in an international advertising campaign for Reebok, supporting a new shoe release.

An inopportune injury in 2008 kept Lukezic off the Olympic team when he struggled to finish 10th at the Olympic Trials.

On November 11, 2009, Lukezic announced via Twitter and in Runners World Magazine that he had decided to retire from the sport.

On September 2, 2010, the US Anti-doping Agency suspended the retired Lukezic for two years for refusing to give a urine sample during an out-of-competition test on April 20, 2010, nearly 6 months after he had retired, and 1 year since his last competition.

== Outside track ==
In September 2009, Lukezic began working at San Francisco based start-up Airbnb.
