= Arturo Casado =

Spanish middle-distance runner

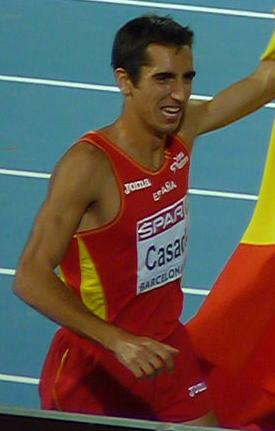
Casado in the 2010 European Athletics Championships.

Arturo Casado Alda (born 26 January 1983 in Madrid) is a Spanish middle-distance runner.

== Achievements ==
Year	Competition	Venue	Position	Event	Notes
Representing Spain
2001	European Junior Championships	Grosseto, Italy	3rd	1500 m	3:48.76
2002	World Junior Championships	Kingston, Jamaica	6th	1500 m	3:44.67
2003	European U23 Championships	Bydgoszcz, Poland	7th	1500 m	3:46.17
2004	Ibero-American Championships	Huelva, Spain	3rd	1500 m	3:40.30
2005	European Indoor Championships	Madrid, Spain	4th	1500 m	3:38.94
2005	Mediterranean Games	Almería, Spain	1st	1500 m	3:45.61
2005	European U23 Championships	Erfurt, Germany	1st	1500 m	3:47.02
2005	World Championships	Helsinki, Finland	5th	1500 m	3:39.45
2006	World Indoor Championships	Moscow, Russia	20th (h)	1500 m	3:48.87
2006	European Championships	Gothenburg, Sweden	4th	1500 m	3:40.86
2007	European Indoor Championships	Birmingham, United Kingdom	3rd	1500 m	3:44.73
2007	World Championships	Osaka, Japan	7th	1500 m	3:35.62
2008	World Indoor Championships	Valencia, Spain	4th	1500 m	3:38.88
2008	Olympic Games	Beijing, China	22nd (sf)	1500 m	3:41.57
2009	European Indoor Championships	Turin, Italy	5th	1500 m	3:45.17
2009	World Championships	Berlin, Germany	25th (h)	1500 m	3:43.21
2010	European Championships	Barcelona, Spain	1st	1500 m	3:42.74
2013	European Indoor Championships	Gothenburg, Sweden	5th	1500 m	3:39.36

=== Personal bests ===
- 800 metres - 1:44.74 - Rieti (ITA) 29.08.2010
- 1500 metres - 3:32.70 - Berlin (GER) 22.08.2010
- Mile - 3:52.38 - Oslo (NOR) 15.06.2007
