= Nathan Brannen =

Canadian middle-distance runner

Nate Brannen
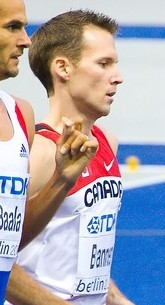
- Brannen at the 2009 World Championships in Berlin

Personal information
- Full name: Nathan Brannen
- Born: 8 September 1982 (age 43) Cambridge, Ontario, Canada
- Height: 5 ft 9 in (175 cm)
- Weight: 130 lb (59 kg)

Sport
- Sport: Track
- Event: 1500 metres
- College team: Michigan

Achievements and titles
- Personal best(s): 800m: 1:46.00; 1500m: 3:34.22; Mile: 3:52.63
Medal record
Men's athletics
Representing Canada
Commonwealth Games
| Silver medal – second place | 2006 Melbourne | 1500 m |
Pan American Games
| Silver medal – second place | 2015 Toronto | 1500 m |

Nathan Brannen (born 8 September 1982) is a Canadian retired middle-distance runner from Cambridge, Ontario, who competed at three Summer Olympics: 2008, 2012 and 2016. Brannen is a graduate of the University of Michigan.

He is affiliated with the Phoenix Athletics Association of Ontario.

Brannen is currently the Cross Country head coach at St. Edward High School in Lakewood, Ohio.

== Running career ==
As an 18-year-old student at Preston High School in his hometown of Cambridge, Ontario, Brannen became only the seventh sub-four-minute high school mile recorder in the history of North America, at the 2001 Aileen Meagher Track Classic in Halifax, Nova Scotia. Originally, Brannen intended to join University of Arkansas and their prestigious track program but ended up being recruited by University of Michigan, in the same recruiting class as Alan Webb.

In July 2016, he was named to Canada's Olympic team. He finished 10th in the finals of the 1,500m in Rio.

== Personal bests ==
| Event | Best | Location | Date |
|---|---|---|---|
| 800 metres | 1:46.00 | Baton Rouge, LA, United States | 31 May 2002 |
| 1000 metres | 2:16.52 | Linz, Austria | 20 August 2012 |
| 1500 metres | 3:34.22 | Hengelo, Netherlands | 27 May 2012 |
| Mile | 3:52.63 | Eugene, OR, United States | 7 June 2009 |
| 2000 metres | 4:59.56 | Toronto, ON, Canada | 11 July 2013 |
| 3000 metres | 7:48.98 | London, England | 27 July 2013 |
| 5000 metres | 13:43.19 | Palo Alto, CA, United States | 31 March 2007 |
