= Andy Baddeley =

English middle-distance runner

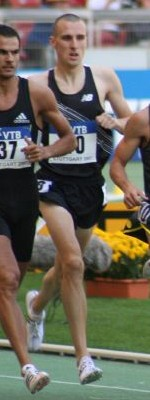

Personal information
- Nationality: British (English)
- Born: 20 June 1982 (age 44) Upton, England
- Height: 186 cm (6 ft 1 in)
- Weight: 70 kg (154 lb)

Sport
- Sport: Athletics
- Event: middle-distance
- Club: Harrow AC
Medal record
Representing Great Britain
Summer Universiade
Silver medal – second place	2005 Izmir	1500 m

Andrew James Baddeley (born 20 June 1982) is an English former middle-distance runner who competed at the 2008 Summer Olympics and the 2012 Summer Olympics.

== Biography ==
Baddeley attended Calday Grange Grammar School, and then graduated from Gonville and Caius College, Cambridge with a first in Engineering.

He finished sixth in the 1500 metres final at the 2006 European Athletics Championships in Gothenburg. He also represented England at the 2006 Commonwealth Games in Melbourne and has a silver medal from the 2005 Summer Universiade.

He finished second in the 1500 metres final at the European Cup in Athletics 2007 in Munich, with a time of 3:48.08 minutes.

At the Bislett Games on 15 June 2007, Baddeley ran 3:51.95 for the mile which took almost 5 seconds off his personal best and moved him to 12th spot on the UK all time ranking list. He won the Dream Mile at the 2008 Bislett Games in a world leading time of 3:49.38, taking another 2 seconds off his lifetime best.

Baddeley is a member of Harrow Athletics Club and competed in the British Athletics League matches when available for domestic duty. He won the short race at the Great Edinburgh International Cross Country in both 2008 and 2009.

He took part in the Beijing 2008 Olympics qualifying for the 1500m finals in which he finished in 8th place.

He ran the 1500 metres at the 2009 World Championships but only managed to reach the semi-finals. A month after the Championships, he competed in the Fifth Avenue Mile and beat Bernard Lagat and Leonel Manzano among others to win the race. Also in 2009 he ran in the team which set a British record time of 14:54.57 in the 4×1500 metres relay.

Going into the 2010 European Athletics Championships, he had the European leading time of 3:34.50 (via a fifth-place finish at the British Grand Prix). He failed to reach the podium in a tactical 1500 m final and he finished in sixth place behind the Spanish team in Barcelona. He represented Europe at the 2010 IAAF Continental Cup and finished in fifth place, one spot behind European champion Arturo Casado. He returned to defend his Fifth Avenue Mile title but managed only third place on the occasion, finishing behind Amine Laâlou and Bernard Lagat.

On 11 August 2012, Baddeley became the holder of the UK parkrun record by completing the 5 km multi-terrain course at the Bushy Park event in 13:48, a record that stood for almost 11 years. It was surpassed by Andy Butchart at the Edinburgh parkrun on 24 June 2023.

Baddeley was a four-times British 1500 metres champion after winning the British AAA Championships title in 2006 and the British Athletics Championships in 2007, 2010 and 2012.

In 2019, Baddeley founded media company The Running Channel with media executive Adam Tranter. The company raised £1 million in private investment to fund its international expansion. According to Baddeley, who is chief executive, the publisher reaches viewers in 120 countries, with a third of its audience located in the US.

== Personal bests ==
Track	Event	Time	Date	Place
Outdoor	800 m	1.46.32	30 June 2007	Watford
Outdoor	1000 m	2:16.99	7 August 2007	Stockholm
Outdoor	1500 m	3:34.36+	6 June 2008	Oslo
Outdoor	One mile	3:49.38	6 June 2008	Oslo
Outdoor	3000 m	7:39.86	25 May 2012	Ostrava
Outdoor	5000 m	13:20.99	5 March 2009	Melbourne
Outdoor	Half-Marathon	1:15:22	15 March 2026	Milton Keynes
Outdoor	Marathon	2:50:07	7 December 2025	Valencia
parkrun	5 km	13:48.00	11 August 2012	Bushy Park, London
Indoor
Indoor	800 m	1:48.67	11 February 2006	Sheffield
Indoor	1500 m	3:37.50	28 January 2006	Glasgow
Indoor	One mile	3:53.23	21 January 2006	New York City
Indoor	3000 m	7:45.10	26 January 2006	Boston

- All information taken from World Athletics profile.
