= Chauncy Master =

Malawian middle-distance runner

Chauncy Makolani Master (born 2 June 1985 in Mulanje) is a Malawian middle-distance runner who specializes in the 1500 metres.

He competed at the 2006 Commonwealth Games, the 2007 World Championships and the 2008 Olympic Games without progressing to the second round.

His personal best times are:

- 800 metres – 1:49.70 min (2008)
- 1500 metres – 3:42.73 min (2008)

In 2017, he competed in the senior men's race at the 2017 IAAF World Cross Country Championships held in Kampala, Uganda. He finished in 74th place.
