= Haron Keitany =

Kenyan middle-distance runner

Medal record

Men's athletics

Representing Kenya

World Indoor Championships
Bronze medal – third place	2010 Doha	1500 m

African Championships
Gold medal – first place	2008 Addis Ababa	1500 m

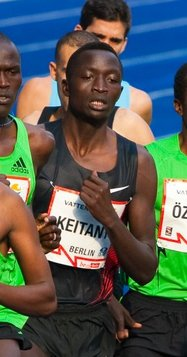
Haron Keitany

Haron Keitany (born December 17, 1983) is a runner from Kenya, who specialises in 1500 metres. In 2008, he won 1500 metres races at the African Championships, the IAAF Golden League meeting of Weltklasse Zürich, and World Athletics Final. He missed the Beijing Olympics though, after finishing fourth at the Kenyan trials.

He competed at the 2009 World Championships, but did not start his semifinal.

His personal best over 1500 metres is 3:30.20, set in June 2009.

Keitany is nicknamed “Land Cruiser”. He is the sixth-born in a family of 10. He graduated from Anasens High School in Wareng District in 2003 and took up running two year later. He is trained by Amos Korir at Golazo Athletics Club in Eldoret

== Achievements ==
Year	Competition	Venue	Position	Event	Notes
Representing Kenya
2008	African Championships	Addis Ababa, Ethiopia	1st	1500 m	3:43.47
2008	World Athletics Final	Stuttgart, Germany	1st	1500 m	3:37.92
2009	World Championships	Berlin, Germany	2nd (h)	1500 m	3:37.13
2010	World Indoor Championships	Doha, Qatar	3rd	1500 m	3:42.32

== Personal Bests ==
Outdoors

- 1500 Metres - 3:30.20 - Berlin, GER - 14/06/2009
- Mile - 3:48.78 - Eugene, OR - 07/06/2009

Indoors

- 1000 Metres - 2:16.76 - Moskava - 01/02/2009
- 1500 Metres - 3:33.96 - Gent - 08/02/2009
