= Peter van der Westhuizen =

South African middle-distance runner

Personal information
- Born: 21 December 1984
- Education: University of Nebraska–Lincoln

Sport
- Sport: Athletics
- Event: 1500 metres
- College team: Nebraska Cornhuskers
- Coached by: Glen van der Westhuizen

Peter van der Westhuizen (born 21 December 1984) is a South African retired middle-distance runner who specialised in the 1500 metres. He represented his country at the 2009 World Championships and 2010 World Indoor Championships.

== International competitions ==
Year	Competition	Venue	Position	Event	Notes
Representing South Africa
2009	World Championships	Berlin, Germany	22nd (sf)	1500 m	3:40.00
2010	World Indoor Championships	Doha, Qatar	18th (h)	1500 m	3:45.76
2012	African Championships	Porto-Novo, Benin	11th	1500 m	3:43.40

== Personal bests ==
Outdoor

- 800 metres – 1:47.60 (Padua 2009)
- 1000 metres – 2:17.81 (Stockholm 2009)
- 1500 metres – 3:35.33 (New York 2009)
- One mile – 3:54.90 (Oslo 2010)
- 3000 metres – 8:00.05 (Luzern 2010)

Indoor

- 800 metres – 1:49.98 (Lincoln 2007)
- 1000 metres – 2:23.41 (Lincoln 2007)
- 1500 metres – 3:42.38 (Birmingham 2010)
- One mile – 3:59.43 (Winston-Salem 2013)
- 3000 metres – 8:07.50 (Lincoln 2008)
- 5000 metres – 14:20.65 (Lincoln 2008)
