= Nick McCormick =

British long-distance runner (born 1981)

Personal information
- Nationality: British (English)
- Born: 11 September 198 Hexham, England
- Height: 188 cm (6 ft 2 in)
- Weight: 70 kg (154 lb)

Sport
- Sport: Athletics
- Event: middle-distance
- Club: Morpeth Harriers

Nicholas Adam McCormick (born 11 September 1981) is a former long distance runner from England who competed at the 2012 Summer Olympics.

== Biography ==
McCormick became the British 1500 metres champion after winning the British AAA Championships title at the 2005 AAA Championships. He later finished on the podium at three successive British Athletics Championships from 2009 to 2011.

He represented England at the 2006 Commonwealth Games in Melbourne and at the 2012 Olympic Games in London, he represented Great Britain.

== Achievements ==
| Year | Competition | Venue | Position | Event | Notes |
Representing Great Britain and England
| 2005 | World Championships | Helsinki, Finland | 34th | 1500 m | 3:44.40 |
| 2006 | Commonwealth Games | Melbourne, Australia | 5th | 1500 m | 3:39.55 |
| 2006 | European Championships | Gothenburg, Sweden | 12th | 5000 m | 14:06.18 |
| 2008 | World Indoor Championships | Valencia, Spain | 9th (h) | 3000 m | 8:00.01 |
| 2009 | European Indoor Championships | Turin, Italy | 6th | 3000 m | 7:52.07 |
| 2011 | European Indoor Championships | Paris, France | 18th (h) | 1500 m | 3:48.65 |
| 2012 | Olympic Games | London, United Kingdom | 14th (h) | 5000 m | 13:25.70 |
