= Elkanah Angwenyi =

Kenyan runner

Elkanah Angwenyi (born 5 February 1983 in Nyamira) is a Kenyan runner who specializes in the 1500 metres. He won the bronze medal at the 2006 World Indoor Championships.

He started running while at primary school. He was recruited by Kenya Police in 2001. In 2004 he was spotted by Hussein Makke, who became his manager and sent him to the US, where he has since competed at various road and track races.

Angwenyi is married with a son born in 2003 (as of 2006).

== Competition record ==
Year	Competition	Venue	Position	Event	Notes
Representing Kenya
2006	World Indoor Championships	Moscow, Russia	3rd	1500 m	3:42.98
2006	African Championships	Bambous, Mauritius	8th	1500 m	3:48.69
2006	World Athletics Final	Stuttgart, Germany	8th	1500 m	3:34.37

== Personal bests ==
- 800 metres - 1:46.3 min (2005)
- 1500 metres - 3:31.97 min (2006)
- 3000 metres - 7:43.28 min (2004)
