= Deresse Mekonnen =

Ethiopian middle-distance runner

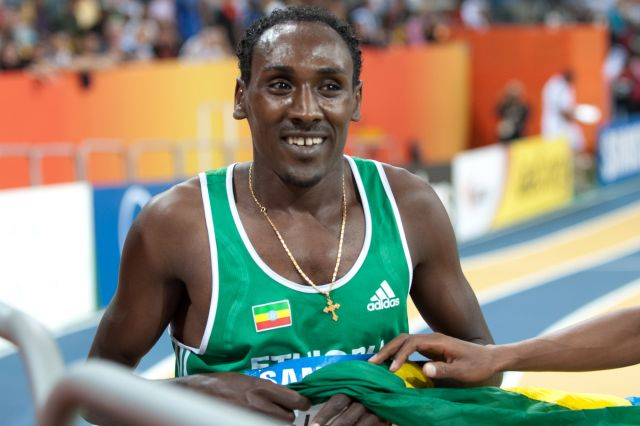
- Mekonnen at the 2010 World Indoor Championships

Personal information
- Born: October 20, 1987 (age 38) Sheno, Ethiopia

Sport
- Country: Ethiopia
- Sport: Track
- Events: 1500 metres, Mile

Achievements and titles
- Personal bests: 1500 metres: 3:32.26; Mile: 3:48.95
Medal record
Men's athletics
Representing Ethiopia
World Championships
Silver medal – second place	2009 Berlin	1500 m
World Indoor Championships
Gold medal – first place	2008 Valencia	1500 m
Gold medal – first place	2010 Doha	1500 m

Deresse Mekonnen Tsigu (Amharic: ደረሠ መኮንነን; born 20 October 1987) is an Ethiopian middle distance runner, who specializes in the 1500 metres. He is a two-time World Indoor champion and was the silver medallist at the 2009 World Championships. He represented Ethiopia in the event at the 2008 Beijing Olympics and holds the Ethiopian record for the mile run.

== Running career ==
Born in Sheno, Oromia Region, his first major international competition was the 2007 World Championships in Osaka where he finished 11th in the heats. His first major win came at the 2008 World Indoor Championships in Valencia at the 1500 m, where he was initially disqualified for a lane violation after winning the race. However, the Ethiopian Athletics Federation made an appeal, and the disqualification was reversed, giving Mekonnen the gold medal. He came third in the Dream Mile at the Bislett Games in June with an Ethiopian record of 3:49.72 for the distance. He gained selection for the 2008 Beijing Olympics, but he just missed a place in the 1500 m final as he was eliminated in the semi-finals.

The following year, he became the first Ethiopian to win the Dream Mile and he further improved his national mark in the process, running 3:48.95 minutes. He also improved his 1500 m best to 3:32.18 minutes at the Herculis meeting in Monaco. He entered the 2009 World Championships in Athletics in Berlin and reached the 1500 m final. He won the silver medal behind Yusuf Saad Kamel, becoming Ethiopia's first medallist in the event at the World Championships. He competed in both the 1500 m and 3000 m at the season-closer 2009 IAAF World Athletics Final, but failed to medal in either event.

His focus of the 2010 season was to retain his world title at the 2010 IAAF World Indoor Championships. In the buildup to the competition, he ran at the Aviva Indoor Grand Prix in Birmingham and improved his 1500 m indoor best to 3:33.10 – fifth on the all-time rankings. At the World Indoor Championships Mekonnen held off a challenge from Abdalaati Iguider and became the first athlete since Hicham El Guerrouj to win back-to-back 1500 m titles indoors. A stomach problem side-lined him for six months but on his return in January 2011 he broke Bernard Lagat's six-year-long win streak in the Wanamaker Mile at the Millrose Games.

== Personal bests ==
Outdoors

- 1500 metres - 3:32.18 (2009)
- Mile - 3:48.95 (2009) - Ethiopian Record
- 3000 metres - 7:32.93 (2009)
- 5000 metres - 13:07.75 (2009)

Indoors

- 1500 metres - 3:33.10 (2010) - #5 All-Time
- Mile - 3:54.11 (2009)

== Achievements ==
Year	Competition	Venue	Position	Event	Notes
Representing Ethiopia
2007	World Championships	Osaka, Japan	28th (h)	1500 m	3:43.15
2008	World Indoor Championships	Valencia, Spain	1st	1500 m	3:38.23
2008	African Championships	Addis Ababa, Ethiopia	4th	1500 m	3:44.19
2008	Olympic Games	Beijing, China	13th (sf)	1500 m	3:37.85
2009	World Championships	Berlin, Germany	2nd	1500 m	3:36.01
2009	World Athletics Final	Thessaloniki, Greece	8th	1500 m	3:37.51
2009	World Athletics Final	Thessaloniki, Greece	4th	3000 m	8:05.32
2010	World Indoor Championships	Doha, Qatar	1st	1500 m	3:41.86
2011	World Championships	Daegu, South Korea	11th (sf)	1500 m	3:44.65
