= Geoffrey Rono =

Kenyan runner (born 1987)

Personal information
- Nationality: Kenyan
- Born: April 21, 1987

Sport
- Sport: Athletics
- Event(s): 1500 metres, 800 metres

Achievements and titles
- Personal bests: 800m: 1:45.0h (2013); 1500m: 3:32.55 (2008); Marathon: 2:14:40 (2015)
Medal record
Men's athletics
Representing Kenya
International athletics competitions
African Junior Championships
Gold medal – first place	2005 Tunis	800 m
Gold medal – first place	2005 Tunis	1500 m
IAAF Golden League
Gold medal – first place	2009	4 × 1500 m relay

Geoffrey Kipkoech Rono (born 4 April 1987) is a Kenyan distance runner who competed primarily in the 1500 metres and 800 metres. He won both events at the 2005 African Junior Athletics Championships, and is a former world record holder in the 4 × 1500 metres relay.

== Biography ==
At the 2005 African Junior Athletics Championships, Rono swept the 800 m and 1500 m titles, winning in times of 1:47.10 and 3:42.76 respectively. The following year, Rono placed 4th at the 1500 metres at the World Junior Championships.

In 2008, Rono recorded his best finish a senior international championship with a 5th-place result at the African Championships in the 1500 m.

In 2009, Rono was part of the Kenyan quartet that broke the 4 × 1500 metres relay world record at the Memorial van Damme meet in Brussels with a time of 14:36.23, winning the IAAF Golden League title in the process. The prior record by a German team from 1977 was the oldest standing track record maintained by the IAAF.

== Statistics ==
=== Personal bests ===
Event	Mark	Competition	Venue	Date
800 metres	1:45.0h	Kenyan Police Championships	Nairobi, Kenya	20 September 2008
1000 metres	2:15.97	BAUHAUS-galan	Stockholm, Sweden	22 July 2008
1500 metres	3:32.55	Internationales Stadionfest	Berlin, Germany	1 June 2008
4 × 1500 metres relay	14:36.23 WR	Memorial Van Damme	Brussels, Belgium	20 April 2008
Marathon	2:14:40	Brussels Marathon	Brussels, Belgium	4 October 2015
