= Adrian Blincoe =

New Zealand middle-distance runner

Personal information
- Born: 4 November 1979 (age 47) Auckland, New Zealand
- Height: 180 cm (5 ft 11 in)
- Weight: 60 kg (132 lb)

Adrian Blincoe (born 4 November 1979 in Auckland) is a New Zealand middle-distance runner. In July 2008 he set the New Zealand record in the 5000m, running 13:10.19.

Blincoe represented New Zealand in the 2008 Summer Olympics at Beijing in the 5000 metres, coming 27th. In 2012 he was in the New Zealand team for the 2012 Summer Olympics at London, but withdrew because of an ankle injury when he was about to compete in the 5000 metres.

He also represented New Zealand at the 2006 Commonwealth Games (1500 metres) and at the 2010 Commonwealth Games (1500 metres and 5000 metres).

Blincoe attended university in the United States at Villanova University, where he was coached by three-time world champion Marcus O'Sullivan. He was a 7-time All-American at Villanova in cross country, indoor and outdoor track. He holds the Villanova school record in the 3000 metres, and was both an NCAA champion and runner-up at that distance. He also won two NCAA DMR titles while at Villanova. Blincoe was both a professional runner and an assistant coach at Villanova from 2004 through 2012. In 2012 he joined High Performance Sport New Zealand. Blincoe married fellow Villanova alumna Kelly Coyle in New Zealand on 12 December 2008.

== Achievements ==
Year	Competition	Venue	Position	Event	Notes
Representing New Zealand
1998	World Junior Championships	Annecy, France	25th (h)	5000m	15:30.97
2003	World Athletics Final	Monte Carlo, Monaco	10th	1500 m	3:43.28
2006	Commonwealth Games	Melbourne, Australia	10th	1500 m	3:44.88
2006	World Cup	Athens, Greece	8th	5000 m	14:03.29

== Personal bests ==
Distance	Time	Place	Date
800 m	1:48.69	Solihull	2004
1500 m	3:35.50	Rieti	2005
Mile	3:54.40	Rieti	2003
2000 m	4:58.72	Liege	2003
3000 m	7:46.38	Rieti	2010
2 Miles	8:21.00	Sheffield	2005
5000 m	13:10.19 NR	Heusden-Zolder	2008
10000 m	28:25.52	Melbourne	2010
