= Aleksandr Krivchinkov =

Russian middle-distance runner

Personal information
- Nationality: Russian
- Born: 20 January 1983 (age 42)

Sport
- Sport: Middle-distance running
- Event: 1500 metres

Aleksandr Krivchinkov (born 20 January 1983) is a Russian middle-distance runner. He competed in the men's 1500 metres at the 2004 Summer Olympics.
