= Demma Daba =

Ethiopian middle distance runner

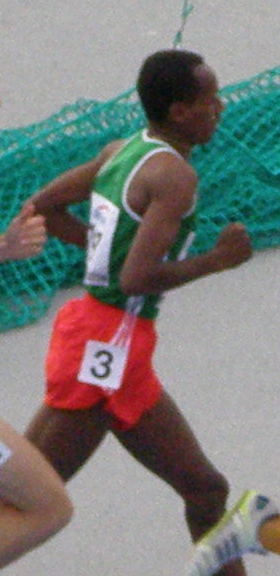
Demma Daba at the 2008 World Junior Championships

Demma Daba (Amharic: ደምማ ዳባ; born 18 July 1989) is an Ethiopian middle distance runner, who specializes in the 1500 metres.

Daba won the bronze medal at the 2008 World Junior Championships. He also competed at the 2008 Olympic Games without progressing to the second round.

His personal best times are:

- 1500 metres - 3:35.27 min (2008)
- 3000 metres - 7:42.63 min (2007)
