= Gideon Gathimba =

Kenyan middle-distance runner

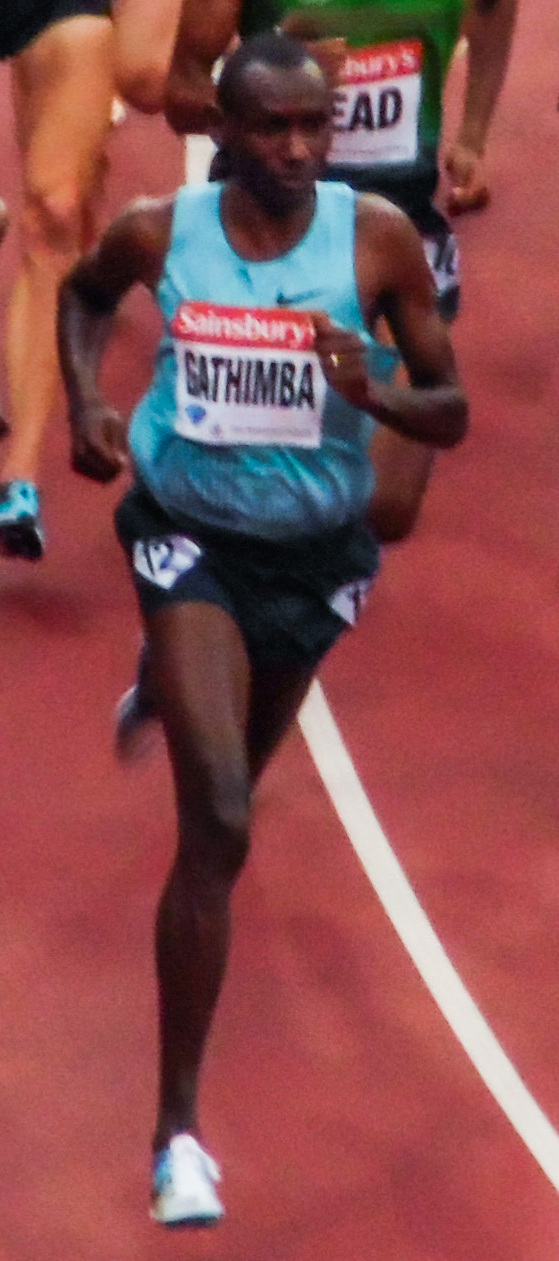
- Gideon Gathimba in 2013

Medal record

Men's athletics

Representing Kenya

African Championships
Silver medal – second place	2008 Addis Ababa	1500 m

Gideon Gathimba (born 9 March 1980) is a Kenyan middle distance runner who specializes in the 1500 metres.

He finished fourth at the 2008 World Athletics Final and fifth at the 2009 World Athletics Final.

His personal best times are 3:33.63 minutes in the 1500 metres, achieved in June 2008 in Rabat; 3:52.98 minutes in the mile run, achieved in June 2009 in Ostrava; and 7:49.65 minutes in the 3000 metres (indoor), achieved in January 2009 in Glasgow. Also, at the Memorial Van Damme meet in September 2009 he set a new world record in the rarely contested 4 x 1500 metres relay. The time was 14:36.23 minutes, and it was achieved with teammates William Biwott Tanui, Geoffrey Kipkoech Rono and Augustine Kiprono Choge.
