= Mounir Yemmouni =

French middle-distance runner

Mounir Yemmouni (born 12 October 1983 in Ouirine, Morocco) is a French middle distance runner who specializes in the 1500 meters.

He competed at the 2004 Summer Olympics and the 2005 World Championships without reaching the finals. At the end of 2005 he finished eleventh in 3000 meters at the World Athletics Final.

In 2006 he competed at the World Indoor Championships and the European Championships, again without reaching the finals.

== Personal bests ==
- 800 metres - 1:45.25 min (2004)
- 1500 metres - 3:32.97 min (2004)
- 3000 metres - 7:53.03 min (2005)
