= 2010 Diamond League =

- Edition: 1st
- Dates: 14 May–27 August
- Events: 32
- Meetings: 14
- Records set: 0
- Individual Prize Money (US$): 6.63 million

The 2010 Diamond League season was the first season of the Diamond League, an annual series of fourteen one-day track and field meetings. The series began on 14 May in Doha, Qatar and ended on 27 August in Brussels, Belgium.

Superseding the European-centred IAAF Golden League, the Diamond League was the IAAF's first intercontinental series of one-day track and field meetings. Expanding upon the idea of the former Golden League jackpot, there were 32 separate Diamond Races, involving 16 men's and 16 women's track and field events – each of the events featured seven times only over the course of the fourteen meetings of the 2010 Diamond League, and the best athlete in each event won a Diamond Trophy. League winners were decided via a points system, with four points going to the winner, two to the runner-up, and one to the third place finisher, with points doubled at the final two meetings in Brussels and Zurich. The total available prize money for the series was US$6.63 million.

For infrastructure reasons the men's and women's hammer throw events were not included in the IAAF Diamond League. For this reason the IAAF created a Hammer Throw challenge.

For the first time, some of the world's foremost track and field athletes were centrally contracted to an athletics meeting series. For the 2010 series the contracted athletes – called Diamond League Ambassadors – included figures such as Usain Bolt, Kenenisa Bekele, Yelena Isinbayeva and Blanka Vlašić.

Prior to the series, former World Champion Steve Cram stated that he believed that, through greater television exposure, and mutual responsibility between the IAAF and promoters, the 2010 Diamond League would raise the profile of the sport of athletics.

== Meeting calendar ==
Leg	Date	Meet	Stadium	City	Country	Diamond events (M+W)
1	14 May	Doha Diamond League	Qatar SC Stadium	Doha	Qatar	7 + 8
2	23 May	Shanghai Diamond League	Shanghai Stadium	Shanghai	China	8 + 7
3	4 June	Bislett Games	Bislett Stadium	Oslo	Norway	8 + 7
4	10 June	Golden Gala	Stadio Olimpico	Rome	Italy	7 + 8
5	12 June	New York adidas Grand Prix	Icahn Stadium	New York City	United States	8 + 7
6	3 July	Prefontaine Classic	Hayward Field	Eugene	United States	7 + 8
7	8 July	Athletissima	Stade Olympique de la Pontaise	Lausanne	Switzerland	8 + 7
8	10 July	British Grand Prix	Gateshead International Stadium	Gateshead	United Kingdom	8 + 7
9	16 July	Meeting Areva	Stade de France	Paris	France	8 + 7
10	22 July	Herculis	Stade Louis II	Fontvieille	Monaco	7 + 8
11	6 August	BAUHAUS-galan	Stockholm Olympic Stadium	Stockholm	Sweden	7 + 8
12	13–14 August	London Grand Prix	Crystal Palace	London	United Kingdom	13 + 14
13	18–19 August	Weltklasse Zürich	Letzigrund	Zurich	Switzerland	8 + 8
14	27 August	Memorial Van Damme	King Baudouin Stadium	Brussels	Belgium	8 + 8

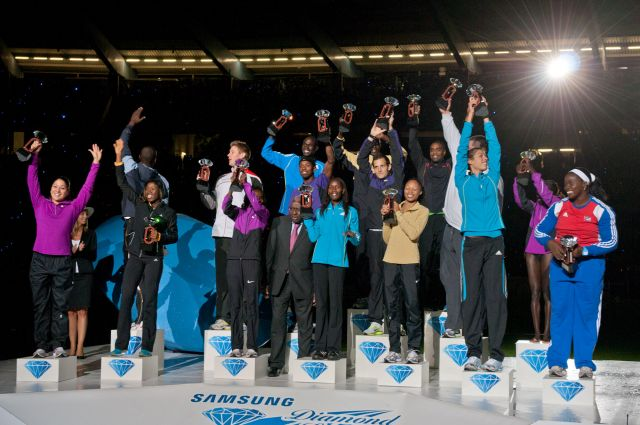
The winners of the 2010 Diamond League Trophies.

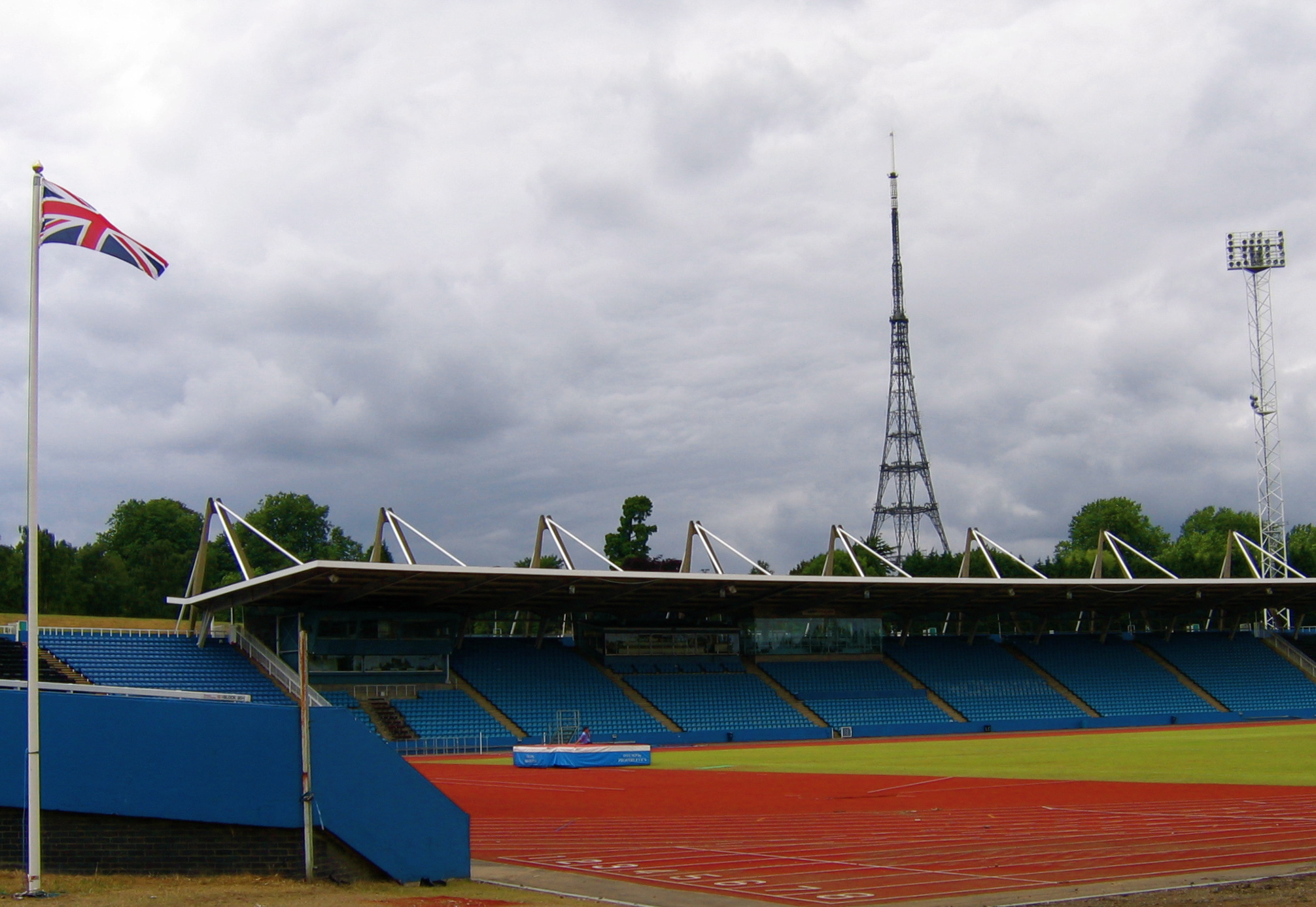
Crystal Palace in London will be one of the venues for the series.

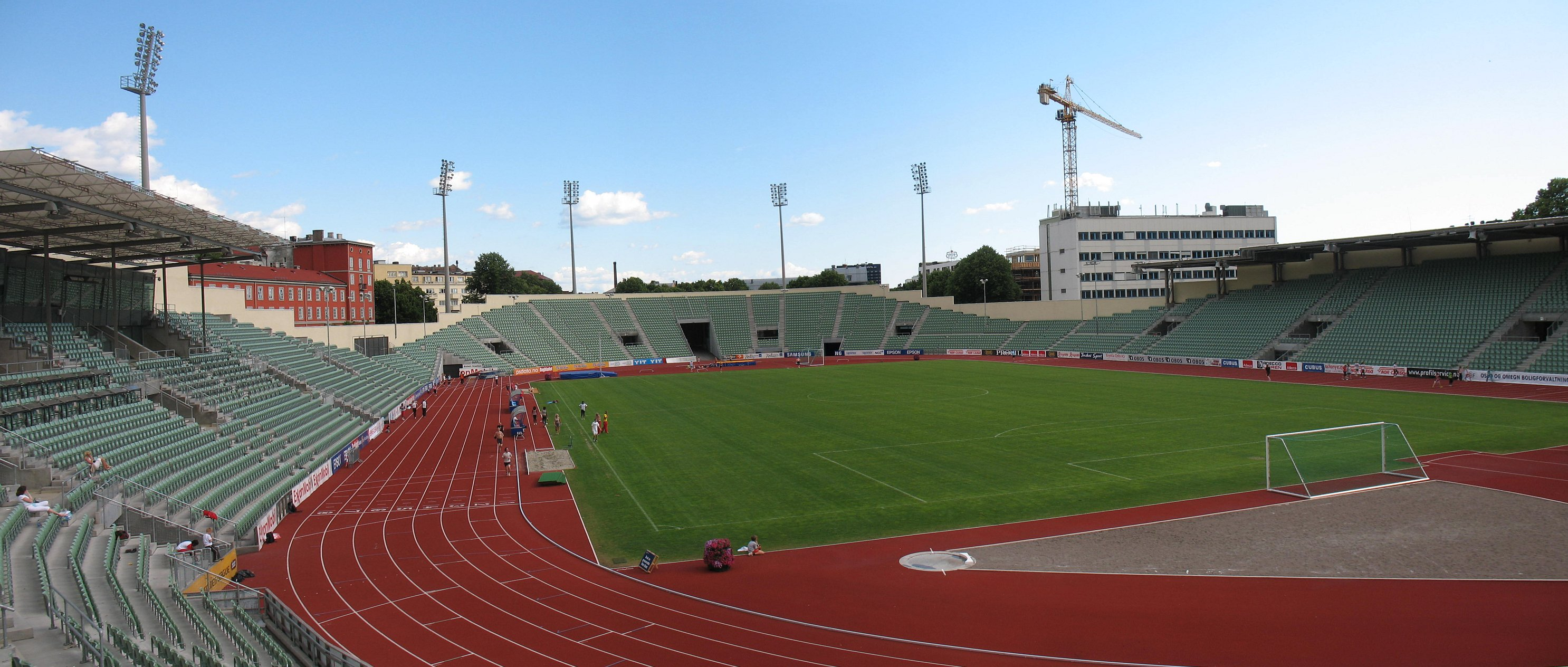
The Bislett Games have been held at Bislett Stadion since 1965.

== Ambassadors ==
A total of fourteen athletes were given Diamond League Ambassador status, with the intention of bringing attention to some of the sport's foremost competitors. There are seven male and seven female athletes, and the division between track and field specialists is also evenly divided.

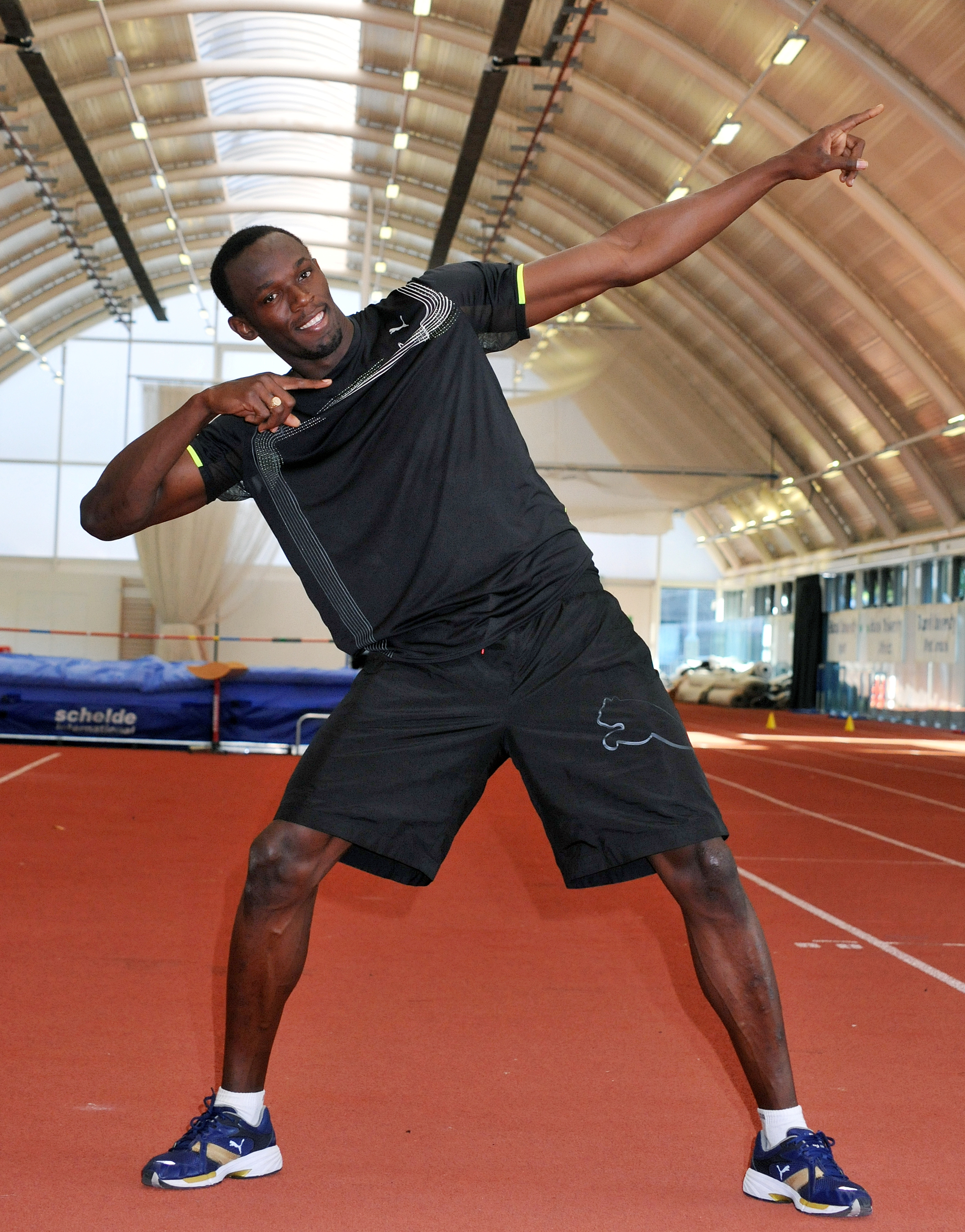
World record holder Usain Bolt is the most prominent ambassador.

Athlete	Country	Event(s)
Usain Bolt	Jamaica	100 metres/200 metres
Tyson Gay	United States	100 metres/200 metres
Asafa Powell	Jamaica	100 metres
Shelly-Ann Fraser	Jamaica	100 metres
Allyson Felix	United States	200 metres/400 metres
Sanya Richards	United States	400 metres
Kenenisa Bekele	Ethiopia	5000 metres/10,000 metres
Steven Hooker	Australia	Pole vault
Yelena Isinbayeva	Russia	Pole vault
Blanka Vlašić	Croatia	High jump
Valerie Vili	New Zealand	Shot put
Andreas Thorkildsen	Norway	Javelin throw
Tero Pitkämäki	Finland	Javelin throw
Barbora Špotáková	Czech Republic	Javelin throw

== Winners ==
Diamond Race track events
Men	100 m	200 m	400 m	800 m	1500 m	5000 m	110 m hurdles	400 m hurdles	3000 m steeplechase
Women	100 m	200 m	400 m	800 m	1500 m	5000 m	100 m hurdles	400 m hurdles	3000 m steeplechase

Diamond Race field events
Men	Pole vault	High jump	Long jump	Triple jump	Shot put	Discus throw	Javelin throw
Women	Pole vault	High jump	Long jump	Triple jump	Shot put	Discus throw	Javelin throw

=== Men ===
==== Track ====
#	Meeting	100 m	200 m	400 m	800 m	1500 m	5000 m	110 m h	400 m h	3000 m st
1	Doha	Asafa Powell (JAM); 9.81w	–	–	David Rudisha (KEN); 1:43.00 WL, MR	–	Eliud Kipchoge (KEN); 12:51.21 WL	–	Bershawn Jackson (USA); 48.66	Ezekiel Kemboi (KEN); 8:06.28 WL
2	Shanghai	–	Usain Bolt (JAM); 19.76 MR	Jeremy Wariner (USA); 45.41 SB	–	Augustine Kiprono Choge (KEN); 3:32.20 WL	–	David Oliver (USA); 12.99 WL, MR	–	–
3	Oslo	Asafa Powell (JAM); 9.72w	–	–	David Rudisha (KEN); 1:42.04 WL, MR	Asbel Kiprop (KEN); 3:49.56 WL	Imane Merga (ETH); 12:53.81 PB	–	Kerron Clement (USA); 48.12 SB	–
4	Rome	–	Walter Dix (USA); 19.86 MR	Jeremy Wariner (USA); 44.73 WL	–	–	Imane Merga (ETH); 13:00.12	Dayron Robles (CUB); 13.14	–	–
5	New York	Richard Thompson (TRI); 9.89w	–	–	Mbulaeni Mulaudzi (RSA); 1:44.38 MR	–	–	–	Kerron Clement (USA); 47.86 MR	Paul Kipsiele Koech (KEN); 8:10.43
6	Eugene	–	Walter Dix (USA); 19.72 MR	–	–	Asbel Kiprop (KEN); 3:49.75	Tariku Bekele (ETH); 12:58.93 MR	David Oliver (USA); 12.90 WL, MR, =NR	–	–
7	Lausanne	Usain Bolt (JAM); 9.82	Walter Dix (USA); 19.86	Jeremy Wariner (USA); 44.57 WL	David Rudisha (KEN); 1:43.25	–	–	–	Bershawn Jackson (USA); 47.62	Brimin Kipruto (KEN); 8:01.62 WL, MR
8	Gateshead	–	Walter Dix (USA); 20.26	–	–	Asbel Kiprop (KEN); 3:33.34	Vincent Chepkok (KEN); 13:00.20 MR	–	–	Linus Chumba (KEN); 8:19.72 MR
9	Paris	Usain Bolt (JAM); 9.84	–	Jeremy Wariner (USA); 44.49 WL	Abubaker Kaki Khamis (SUD); 1:43.50	–	–	David Oliver (USA); 12.89 WL, MR, =NR	–	Brimin Kipruto (KEN); 8:00.90 WL, MR
10	Monaco	–	Tyson Gay (USA); 19.72 MR	Jermaine Gonzales (JAM); 44.40 WL, NR	–	Silas Kiplagat (KEN); 3:29.27 WL	–	David Oliver (USA); 13.01 MR	–	–
11	Stockholm	Tyson Gay (USA); 9.84 MR	–	–	Marcin Lewandowski (POL); 1:45.06	–	Mark Kiptoo (KEN); 12:53.46 PB	–	Bershawn Jackson (USA); 47.65 MR	–
12	London	Tyson Gay (USA); 9.78 WL, MR	–	Jeremy Wariner (USA); 44.67	–	Augustine Kiprono Choge (KEN); 3:50.14 PB	–	David Oliver (USA); 13.06 =MR	Bershawn Jackson (USA); 48.12	Paul Kipsiele Koech (KEN); 8:17.70
13	Zürich	–	Wallace Spearmon (USA); 19.79 MR	Jeremy Wariner (USA); 44.13 WL	–	–	Tariku Bekele (ETH); 12:55.03	David Oliver (USA); 12.93	–	Ezekiel Kemboi (KEN); 8:01.74 SB
14	Brussels	Tyson Gay (USA); 9.79	–	–	David Rudisha (KEN); 1:43.50	Asbel Kiprop (KEN); 3:32.18 SB	–	–	Bershawn Jackson (USA); 47.85	–
Overall winner		Tyson Gay (USA)	Wallace Spearmon (USA)	Jeremy Wariner (USA)	David Rudisha (KEN)	Asbel Kiprop (KEN)	Imane Merga (ETH)	David Oliver (USA)	Bershawn Jackson (USA)	Paul Kipsiele Koech (KEN)

In Oslo, Eugene and London, mile races are counted to the Diamond League standings for the 1500m.

==== Field ====
#	Meeting	Long jump	Triple jump	High jump	Pole vault	Shot put	Discus	Javelin
1	Doha	–	Alexis Copello (CUB); 17.47 WL, MR	–	–	Christian Cantwell (USA); 21.82 WL, MR	–	–
2	Shanghai	Fabrice Lapierre (AUS); 8.30 SB	–	Sylwester Bednarek (POL); 2.24	Malte Mohr (GER); 5.70 SB	–	Zoltán Kővágó (HUN); 69.69 SB	–
3	Oslo	–	–	–	Renaud Lavillenie (FRA); 5.80 SB	Christian Cantwell (USA); 21.31	–	Andreas Thorkildsen (NOR); 86.00
4	Rome	Dwight Phillips (USA); 8.42 WL	–	–	–	Christian Cantwell (USA); 21.67 =MR	Piotr Małachowski (POL); 68.78 MR	–
5	New York	–	Teddy Tamgho (FRA); 17.98 WL, NR	Linus Thörnblad (SWE); 2.30 SB	Renaud Lavillenie (FRA); 5.85 MR	–	–	Andreas Thorkildsen (NOR); 87.02 MR
6	Eugene	Irving Saladino (PAN); 8.46w	–	–	–	Christian Cantwell (USA); 22.41 WL, MR	Piotr Małachowski (POL); 67.66	–
7	Lausanne	–	–	Ivan Ukhov (RUS); 2.33 =WL	Renaud Lavillenie (FRA); 5.85 =SB	–	–	Andreas Thorkildsen (NOR); 87.03
8	Gateshead	Fabrice Lapierre (AUS); 8.20	Phillips Idowu (GBR); 17.38	Linus Thörnblad (SWE); 2.29	–	–	Piotr Małachowski (POL); 69.83 MR, NR	–
9	Paris	–	Arnie David Giralt (CUB); 17.49 SB	–	Renaud Lavillenie (FRA); 5.91	–	–	Andreas Thorkildsen (NOR); 87.50
10	Monaco	Dwight Phillips (USA); 8.46 WL	–	Ivan Ukhov (RUS); 2.34 WL	–	–	Gerd Kanter (EST); 67.81	–
11	Stockholm	–	Teddy Tamgho (FRA); 17.36	–	–	Christian Cantwell (USA); 22.09 MR	–	Tero Pitkämäki (FIN); 84.41
12	London	Dwight Phillips (USA); 8.18	Christian Olsson (SWE); 17.41 SB	Ivan Ukhov (RUS); 2.29	Łukasz Michalski (POL); 5.71	Reese Hoffa (USA); 21.44 SB	Gerd Kanter (EST); 67.82 MR	Andreas Thorkildsen (NOR); 87.38
13	Zürich	Dwight Phillips (USA); 8.20	–	Ivan Ukhov (RUS); 2.29	–	–	Robert Harting (GER); 68.84	–
14	Brussels	–	Teddy Tamgho (FRA); 17.52	–	Malte Mohr (GER); 5.85 PB	Reese Hoffa (USA); 22.16 MR	–	Andreas Thorkildsen (NOR); 89.88
Overall winner		Dwight Phillips (USA)	Teddy Tamgho (FRA)	Ivan Ukhov (RUS)	Renaud Lavillenie (FRA)	Christian Cantwell (USA)	Piotr Małachowski (POL)	Andreas Thorkildsen (NOR)

=== Women ===
==== Track ====
#	Meeting	100 m	200 m	400 m	800 m	1500 m	5000 m	100 m h	400 m h	3000 m st
1	Doha	–	Kerron Stewart (JAM); 22.34w	Allyson Felix (USA); 50.15 WL	–	Nancy Langat (KEN); 4:01.63	–	Lolo Jones (USA); 12.63w	–	–
2	Shanghai	Carmelita Jeter (USA); 11.09	–	–	Janeth Jepkosgei (KEN); 2:01.06	–	Sentayehu Ejigu (ETH); 14:30.96 WL, MR	–	Lashinda Demus (USA); 53.34 WL, MR	Gladys Kipkemoi (KEN); 9:16.82 WL
3	Oslo	–	Carmelita Jeter (USA); 22.54	Amantle Montsho (BOT); 50.34 =SB	–	–	–	Lolo Jones (USA); 12.66 SB	–	Milcah Cheywa (KEN); 9:12.66 WL, MR
4	Rome	LaShauntea Moore (USA); 11.04	–	–	Halima Hachlaf (MAR); 1:58.40 WL	–	–	–	Lashinda Demus (USA); 52.82 WL, MR	Milcah Cheywa (KEN); 9:11.71 WL
5	New York	–	Veronica Campbell-Brown (JAM); 21.98 WL, MR	–	–	Nancy Langat (KEN); 4:01.60 WL, MR	Tirunesh Dibaba (ETH); 15:11.34	Lolo Jones (USA); 12.55 WL	–	–
6	Eugene	Veronica Campbell-Brown (JAM); 10.78 WL, MR	–	Allyson Felix (USA); 50.27	Nancy Langat (KEN); 1:57.75 WL, MR	–	–	–	Lashinda Demus (USA); 53.03 MR	Milcah Cheiywa (KEN); 9:26.70
7	Lausanne	Carmelita Jeter (USA); 10.99	–	–	–	Gelete Burka (ETH); 3:59.28 WL	Vivian Cheruiyot (KEN); 8:34.58 WL, MR (3000m)	Priscilla Lopes-Schliep (CAN); 12.56 SB	–	–
8	Gateshead	Carmelita Jeter (USA); 10.95	–	Shericka Williams (JAM); 50.44	Alysia Johnson (USA); 1:59.84	–	–	–	Kaliese Spencer (JAM); 54.10	–
9	Paris	–	Allyson Felix (USA); 22.14	–	–	Christin Wurth-Thomas (USA); 3:59.59 WL	Vivian Cheruiyot (KEN); 14:27.41 WL, MR	–	–	–
10	Monaco	Carmelita Jeter (USA); 10.82 SB	–	–	Alysia Johnson (USA); 1:57.34 WL	–	Sentayehu Ejigu (ETH); 8:28.41 WL (3000m)	–	Kaliese Spencer (JAM); 53.63	–
11	Stockholm	–	Allyson Felix (USA); 22.41	Debbie Dunn (USA); 50.59	–	Nancy Langat (KEN); 4:00.70	–	Sally Pearson (AUS); 12.57 SB	–	Yuliya Zarudneva (RUS); 9:17.59
12	London	–	Allyson Felix (USA); 22.37	Allyson Felix (USA); 50.79	Janeth Jepkosgei (KEN); 1:59.16	Nancy Langat (KEN); 4:07.60	Tirunesh Dibaba (ETH); 14:36.41	Priscilla Lopes-Schliep (CAN); 12.52 WL, MR	Kaliese Spencer (JAM); 53.78	Milcah Cheywa (KEN); 9:22.49 MR
13	Zürich	Veronica Campbell-Brown (JAM); 10.89	–	Allyson Felix (USA); 50.37	–	Nancy Langat (KEN); 4:01.01	–	–	Kaliese Spencer (JAM); 53.33 PB	–
14	Brussels	–	Allyson Felix (USA); 22.61	–	Janeth Jepkosgei (KEN); 1:58.82	–	Vivian Cheruiyot (KEN); 14:34.13	Priscilla Lopes-Schliep (CAN); 12.54	–	Sofia Assefa (ETH); 9:20.72 SB
Overall winner		Carmelita Jeter (USA)	Allyson Felix (USA)	Allyson Felix (USA)	Janeth Jepkosgei (KEN)	Nancy Langat (KEN)	Vivian Cheruiyot (KEN)	Priscilla Lopes-Schliep (CAN)	Kaliese Spencer (JAM)	Milcah Cheywa (KEN)

In Lausanne and Monaco, 3000m races are counted to the Diamond League standings for the 5000m.

==== Field ====
#	Meeting	Long jump	Triple jump	High jump	Pole vault	Shot put	Discus	Javelin
1	Doha	–	–	Blanka Vlašić (CRO); 1.98	Silke Spiegelburg (GER); 4.70 WL, MR	–	Yarelys Barrios (CUB); 64.90	Barbora Špotáková (CZE); 67.33 WL, MR
2	Shanghai	–	Olga Rypakova (KAZ); 14.89 WL	–	–	Valerie Vili (NZL); 19.72	–	–
3	Oslo	Olga Kucherenko (RUS); 6.91	–	Blanka Vlašić (CRO); 2.01 SB	–	–	Nadine Müller (GER); 63.93	–
4	Rome	–	Yargelis Savigne (CUB); 14.74 SB	Blanka Vlašić (CRO); 2.03 =MR	Fabiana Murer (BRA); 4.70	–	–	Barbora Špotáková (CZE); 68.66 MR
5	New York	Brianna Glenn (USA); 6.78w	–	–	–	Valerie Vili (NZL); 19.93 MR	Sandra Perković (CRO); 61.96	–
6	Eugene	–	Nadezhda Alekhina (RUS); 14.62 MR	–	Fabiana Murer (BRA); 4.58	–	–	Kara Patterson (USA); 65.90 MR
7	Lausanne	Brittney Reese (USA); 6.94 SB	Yargelis Savigne (CUB); 14.99 WL	–	–	–	Yarelys Barrios (CUB); 65.92 SB	–
8	Gateshead	–	–	–	Svetlana Feofanova (RUS); 4.71 SB	Valerie Vili (NZL); 20.06	–	Sunette Viljoen (RSA); 64.32
9	Paris	Brittney Reese (USA); 6.79	–	Blanka Vlašić (CRO); 2.02 MR	–	Valerie Vili (NZL); 20.13	Yarelys Barrios (CUB); 65.53 MR	–
10	Monaco	–	Yargelis Savigne (CUB); 15.09 WL	–	Fabiana Murer (BRA); 4.80	Valerie Vili (NZL); 20.20	–	Barbora Špotáková (CZE); 65.76
11	Stockholm	Darya Klishina (RUS); 6.78	–	Blanka Vlašić (CRO); 2.02	Svetlana Feofanova (RUS); 4.71	–	–	–
12	London	Darya Klishina (RUS); 6.65	Yargelis Savigne (CUB); 14.86	Blanka Vlašić (CRO); 2.01	–	Valerie Vili (NZL); 19.83	Yarelys Barrios (CUB); 65.62	Barbora Špotáková (CZE); 63.50
13	Zürich	Brittney Reese (USA); 6.89	–	–	Fabiana Murer (BRA); 4.81	Valerie Vili (NZL); 20.02	–	Christina Obergföll (GER); 67.31 MR
14	Brussels	–	Olga Rypakova (KAZ); 14.80	Blanka Vlašić (CRO); 2.00	–	–	Sandra Perković (CRO); 66.93 NR	–
Overall winner		Brittney Reese (USA)	Yargelis Savigne (CUB)	Blanka Vlašić (CRO)	Fabiana Murer (BRA)	Valerie Vili (NZL)	Yarelys Barrios (CUB)	Barbora Špotáková (CZE)

== Results ==
Doha
Event	1st +4 pts	2nd +2 pts	3rd +1 pts	4th ⠀	5th ⠀	6th ⠀	7th ⠀	8th ⠀
Men's 100m (+2.3 m/s)	Asafa Powell; JAM | 9.81	Nesta Carter; JAM | 9.88	Travis Padgett; USA | 9.92	Michael Frater; JAM | 9.94	Lerone Clarke; JAM | 9.98	Jaysuma Saidy Ndure; NOR | 10.00	Rae Monzavous Edwards; USA | 10.09	Simone Collio; ITA | DNF
Men's 800m	David Rudisha; KEN | 1:43.00	Asbel Kiprop; KEN | 1:43.45	Amine Laalou; MAR | 1:43.71	Mbulaeni Mulaudzi; RSA | 1:43.78	Yeimer López; CUB | 1:44.18	Michael Rimmer; GBR | 1:45.96	Hamza Driouch; QAT | 1:47.05	Musaeb Abdulrahman Balla; QAT | 1:48.12
Men's 5000m	Eliud Kipchoge; KEN | 12:51.21	Vincent Kiprop Chepkok; KEN | 12:51.45	Imane Merga; ETH | 13:05.20	Essa Ismail Rashed; QAT | 13:08.95	Teklemariam Medhin; ERI | 13:17.93	Ahmad Hassan Abdullah; QAT | 13:18.97	Abera Kuma; ETH | 13:20.78	Joseph Ebuya; KEN | 13:32.81
Men's 400mH	Bershawn Jackson; USA | 48.66	Kerron Clement; USA | 48.82	LJ van Zyl; RSA | 49.59	Angelo Taylor; USA | 49.66	Omar Cisneros; CUB | 49.85	Isa Phillips; JAM | 50.25	Michael Tinsley; USA | 50.65	Bandar Yahya al Sharakili; KSA | 52.21
Men's 3000mSC	Ezekiel Kemboi; KEN | 8:06.28	Paul Kipsiele Koech; KEN | 8:06.69	Tarik Langat Akdag; KEN | 8:09.12	Richard Kipkemboi Mateelong; KEN | 8:09.84	Roba Gari; ETH | 8:10.29	Elijah Chelimo; KEN | 8:14.29	Silas Kosgei Kitum; KEN | 8:16.19	Michael Kipyego; KEN | 8:16.46
Men's Triple Jump	Alexis Copello; CUB | 17.47 m	David Girat; CUB | 17.29 m	Yoandri Betanzos; CUB | 17.22 m	Leevan Sands; BAH | 16.80 m	Dmitrij Vaľukevič; SVK | 16.57 m	Fabrizio Schembri; ITA | 16.49 m	Tumelo Thagane; RSA | 16.44 m	Randy Lewis; GRN | 16.17 m
Men's Shot Put	Christian Cantwell; USA | 21.82 m	Ralf Bartels; GER | 21.14 m	Reese Hoffa; USA | 21.00 m	Dylan Armstrong; CAN | 20.79 m	Tomasz Majewski; POL | 20.39 m	Dan Taylor; USA | 20.22 m	Maksim Sidorov; RUS | 19.63 m	Sultan Abdulmajeed al Hebshi; KSA | 19.40 m
Women's 200m (+3.0 m/s)	Kerron Stewart; JAM | 22.34	Sherone Simpson; JAM | 22.64	Cydonie Mothersill; CAY | 22.66	Sheri-Ann Brooks; JAM | 22.73	Anneisha McLaughlin-Whilby; JAM | 22.93	Natalie Knight; USA | 23.22	Yuliya Gushchina; RUS | 23.26	Bianca Knight; USA | 23.50
Women's 400m	Allyson Felix; USA | 50.15	Amantle Montsho; BOT | 50.34	Novlene Williams-Mills; JAM | 50.50	Debbie Dunn; USA | 50.85	Christine Ohuruogu; GBR | 50.88	Shericka Williams; JAM | 51.11	Monica Hargrove; USA | 51.87	Christine Day; JAM | 52.95
Women's 1500m	Nancy Jebet Langat; KEN | 4:01.63	Gelete Burka; ETH | 4:02.16	Siham Hilali; MAR | 4:03.89	Ibtissam Lakhouad; MAR | 4:04.23	Viola Jelagat Kibiwot; KEN | 4:05.63	Ingvill Måkestad Bovim; NOR | 4:06.08	Genzebe Dibaba; ETH | 4:06.10	Stephanie Twell; GBR | 4:06.10
Women's 100mH (+2.7 m/s)	Lolo Jones; USA | 12.63	Priscilla Schliep; CAN | 12.67	Ginnie Crawford; USA | 12.70	Perdita Felicien; CAN | 12.73	Danielle Carruthers; USA | 12.74	Delloreen Ennis; JAM | 12.75	Dawn Harper-Nelson; USA | 12.77	Tiffany Porter; USA | 12.87
Women's High Jump	Blanka Vlašić; CRO | 1.98 m	Chaunte Lowe; USA | 1.98 m	Ruth Beitia; ESP | 1.94 m	Svetlana Shkolina; RUS | 1.90 m	Emma Green; SWE | 1.85 m	Nadiya Dusanova; UZB | 1.85 m	Viktoriya Slivka-Klyugina; RUS | 1.80 m	Marina Aitova; KAZ | NH m
Women's Pole Vault	Silke Spiegelburg; GER | 4.70 m	Tatyana Polnova; RUS | 4.55 m	Anna Rogowska; POL | 4.55 m	Jiřina Ptáčníková; CZE | 4.55 m	Lacy Janson; USA | 4.55 m	Nikoleta Kyriakopoulou; GRE | 4.55 m	Yuliya Golubchikova; RUS | 4.45 m	Kristina Gadschiew; GER | 4.30 m
Women's Discus Throw	Yarelis Barrios; CUB | 64.90 m	Dani Stevens; AUS | 64.67 m	Sandra Perković; CRO | 62.33 m	Aretha D. Thurmond; USA | 62.26 m	Nicoleta Grasu; ROU | 61.63 m	Věra Pospíšilová-Cechlová; CZE | 58.79 m	Stephanie Brown-Trafton; USA | 54.14 m	Yarisley Collado; CUB | NM
Women's Javelin Throw	Mariya Abakumova; RUS | DQ (Note: Disqualified after competition due to antidoping rule violation)	Barbora Špotáková; CZE | 67.33 m	Martina Ratej; SLO | 67.16 m	Christina Obergföll; GER | 64.38 m	Zahra Bani; ITA | 57.29 m	Ásdís Hjálmsdóttir; ISL | 54.74 m	Maria Nicoleta Negoiţă; ROU | 54.21 m	Elisabeth Pauer; AUT | 52.97 m

Shanghai
Event	1st +4 pts	2nd +2 pts	3rd +1 pts	4th ⠀	5th ⠀	6th ⠀	7th ⠀	8th ⠀
Men's 200m (−0.8 m/s)	Usain Bolt; JAM | 19.76	Angelo Taylor; USA | 20.34	Ryan Bailey; USA | 20.43	Marvin Anderson; JAM | 20.48	Churandy Martina; AHO | 20.95	Ronald Pognon; FRA | 21.00	Shinji Takahira; JPN | 21.12	Peimeng Zhang; CHN | 21.46
Men's 400m	Jeremy Wariner; USA | 45.41	David Neville; USA | 45.70	Michael Bingham; GBR | 45.84	Gary Kikaya; COD | 46.07	Ben Offereins; AUS | 46.08	Leslie Djhone; FRA | 46.37	Xiaosheng Liu; CHN | 46.62	Johan Wissman; SWE | 46.64
Men's 1500m	Augustine Kiprono Choge; KEN | 3:32.20	Asbel Kiprop; KEN | 3:32.22	Mekonnen Gebremedhin; ETH | 3:33.35	Ilham Tanui Özbilen; KEN | 3:33.67	Geoffrey Kipkoech Rono; KEN | 3:33.92	Suleiman Kipses Simotwo; KEN | 3:33.96	Nixon Kiplimo Chepseba; KEN | 3:33.99	Haron Keitany; KEN | 3:37.87
Men's 110mH (−0.4 m/s)	David Oliver; USA | 12.99	Dongpeng Shi; CHN | 13.39	Xiang Liu; CHN | 13.40	Wenjun Xie; CHN | 13.58	Allen Johnson; USA | 13.65	Dwight Thomas; JAM | 13.75	Yin Jing; CHN | 13.95	Mike van Kruchten; NED | 14.01
Men's High Jump	Sylwester Bednarek; POL | 2.24 m	Jesse Williams; USA | 2.24 m	Linus Thörnblad; SWE | 2.24 m	Jaroslav Bába; CZE | 2.20 m	Tora Harris; USA | 2.20 m	Andrey Tereshin; RUS | 2.20 m	Wang Chen; CHN | 2.20 m	Martijn Nuijens; NED | 2.20 m
Men's Pole Vault	Malte Mohr; GER | 5.70 m	Aleksandr Gripich; RUS | 5.60 m	Maksym Mazuryk; UKR | 5.60 m	Hendrik Gruber; GER | 5.60 m	Yansheng Yang; CHN | 5.60 m	Steven Hooker; AUS | 5.50 m	Steven Lewis; GBR | 5.40 m	Jeremy Scott; USA | 5.40 m
Men's Long Jump	Fabrice Lapierre; AUS | 8.30 m	Dwight Phillips; USA | 8.18 m	Xiongfeng Su; CHN | 8.06 m	Ignisious Gaisah; GHA | 7.91 m	Brian Johnson; USA | 7.80 m	Chris Noffke; AUS | 7.74 m	Andriy Makarchev; UKR | 7.73 m	Zhenwei Yu; CHN | 7.57 m
Men's Discus Throw	Zoltán Kővágó; HUN | 69.69 m	Robert Harting; GER | 68.69 m	Piotr Małachowski; POL | 68.66 m	Gerd Kanter; EST | 68.61 m	Ehsan Hadadi; IRI | 67.08 m	Jason Young; USA | 64.26 m	Jarred Rome; USA | 62.04 m	Ian Waltz; USA | 61.21 m
Women's 100m (−0.1 m/s)	Carmelita Jeter; USA | 11.09	Chandra Sturrup; BAH | 11.38	Bianca Knight; USA | 11.51	Me'Lisa Barber; USA | 11.54	Schillonie Calvert-Powell; JAM | 11.66	Yujia Tao; CHN | 11.69	Lan Jiang; CHN | 11.95	Shelly-Ann Fraser-Pryce; JAM | DQ
Women's 800m	Janeth Jepkosgei; KEN | 2:01.06	Jennifer Meadows; GBR | 2:01.34	Kenia Sinclair; JAM | 2:01.87	Angelika Cichocka; POL | 2:02.30	Tetyana Petlyuk; UKR | DQ	Renata Pliś; POL | 2:03.19	Pamela Jelimo; KEN | 2:03.89	Li Yong; CHN | 2:04.50
Women's 5000m	Sentayehu Ejigu; ETH | 14:30.96	Linet Chepkwemoi Masai; KEN | 14:31.14	Meselech Melkamu; ETH | 14:31.91	Sylvia Jebiwot Kibet; KEN | 14:31.91	Sule Utura; ETH | 14:44.21	Emebet Anteneh; ETH | 14:44.90	Mercy Cherono; KEN | 14:47.13	Viola Jelagat Kibiwot; KEN | 14:48.57
Women's 400mH	Lashinda Demus; USA | 53.34	Natalya Antyukh; RUS | 54.83	Anna Jesień; POL | 55.12	Anastasiya Rabchenyuk; UKR | 55.29	Melaine Walker; JAM | 55.33	Kaliese Carter; JAM | 55.59	Satomi Kubokura; JPN | 55.61	Sheena Johnson-Tosta; USA | 56.86
Women's 3000mSC	Gladys Jerotich Kipkemoi; KEN | 9:16.82	Milcah Chemos; KEN | 9:20.63	Lydia Chebet Rotich; KEN | 9:21.38	Katarzyna Kowalska; POL | 9:30.79	Sofia Assefa; ETH | 9:31.62	Ancuţa Bobocel; ROU | 9:40.77	Lisa Aguilera; USA | 9:41.62	Elizabeth Mueni; KEN | 9:53.33
Women's Triple Jump	Olga Rypakova; KAZ | 14.89 m	Yargelis Savigne; CUB | 14.61 m	Anna Pyatykh; RUS | 13.94 m	Nadezhda Alyokhina; RUS | 13.90 m	Gisele Lima de Oliveira; BRA | 13.65 m	Yanan Liu; CHN | 13.60 m	Limei Xie; CHN | 13.53 m	Trecia Kaye Smith; JAM | 13.42 m
Women's Shot Put	Nadezhda Ostapchuk; BLR | DQ	Valerie Adams; NZL | 19.72 m	Lijiao Gong; CHN | 19.60 m	Michelle Carter; USA | 18.79 m	Jillian Camarena-Williams; USA | 18.56 m	Xiangrong Liu; CHN | 18.49 m	Nadine Kleinert; GER | 18.44 m	Misleydis González; CUB | 18.08 m

Oslo
Event	1st +4 pts	2nd +2 pts	3rd +1 pts	4th ⠀	5th ⠀	6th ⠀	7th ⠀	8th ⠀
Men's 100m (+2.1 m/s)	Asafa Powell; JAM | 9.72	Richard Thompson; TTO | 9.90	Churandy Martina; AHO | 9.92	Michael Frater; JAM | 9.97	Trell Kimmons; USA | 10.08	Lerone Clarke; JAM | 10.11	Jaysuma Saidy Ndure; NOR | 10.14	Martial Mbandjock; FRA | 10.26
Men's 800m	David Rudisha; KEN | 1:42.04	Abubaker Kaki; SUD | 1:42.23	Marcin Lewandowski; POL | 1:44.56	Michael Rimmer; GBR | 1:44.98	Alfred Kirwa Yego; KEN | 1:45.14	Bram Som; NED | 1:45.21	Adam Kszczot; POL | 1:45.75	Thomas Arne Roth; NOR | 1:48.79
Men's Mile	Asbel Kiprop; KEN | 3:49.56	Mekonnen Gebremedhin; ETH | 3:49.83	Gideon Gathimba; KEN | 3:50.53	Ilham Tanui Özbilen; KEN | 3:50.75	Boaz Kiplagat Lalang; KEN | 3:52.18	Deresse Mekonnen; ETH | 3:53.52	Geoffrey Kipkoech Rono; KEN | 3:54.37	Peter van der Westhuizen; RSA | 3:54.90
Men's 5000m	Imane Merga; ETH | 12:53.81	Tariku Bekele; ETH | 12:53.97	Bernard Lagat; USA | 12:54.12	Lucas Kimeli Rotich; KEN | 12:55.06	Vincent Kiprop Chepkok; KEN | 12:56.32	Chris Solinsky; USA | 12:56.66	Alemayehu Bezabeh; ESP | 12:57.25	Mathew Kipkoech Kisorio; KEN | 12:57.83
Men's 400mH	Kerron Clement; USA | 48.12	Bershawn Jackson; USA | 48.25	David Greene; GBR | 49.05	Isa Phillips; JAM | 49.38	LJ van Zyl; RSA | 49.50	Justin Gaymon; USA | 49.56	Michael Tinsley; USA | 49.70	Andreas Totsås; NOR | 52.87
Men's Pole Vault	Renaud Lavillenie; FRA | 5.80 m	Malte Mohr; GER | 5.70 m	Aleksandr Gripich; RUS | 5.60 m	Michal Balner; CZE | 5.60 m	Przemysław Czerwiński; POL | 5.60 m	Derek Miles; USA | 5.40 m	Maksym Mazuryk; UKR | 5.40 m	Alexander Straub; GER | NH m
Men's Shot Put	Christian Cantwell; USA | 21.31 m	Dylan Armstrong; CAN | 21.16 m	Tomasz Majewski; POL | 21.12 m	Reese Hoffa; USA | 20.69 m	Ralf Bartels; GER | 20.59 m	Pavel Lyzhyn; BLR | DQ	Adam Nelson; USA | 19.91 m	Kim Juhl Christensen; DEN | 18.92 m
Men's Javelin Throw	Andreas Thorkildsen; NOR | 86.00 m	Petr Frydrych; CZE | 85.33 m	Teemu Wirkkala; FIN | 85.04 m	Tero Pitkämäki; FIN | 84.43 m	Guillermo Martínez; CUB | 84.35 m	Ari Mannio; FIN | 83.81 m	Antti Ruuskanen; FIN | 83.45 m	Vadims Vasiļevskis; LAT | 82.61 m
Women's 200m (+1.0 m/s)	Carmelita Jeter; USA | 22.54	Debbie Ferguson-McKenzie; BAH | 22.89	Aleksandra Fedoriva-Spayer; RUS | 22.98	Cydonie Mothersill; CAY | 22.99	Sheri-Ann Brooks; JAM | 23.18	Ebonie Floyd; USA | 23.20	Anneisha McLaughlin-Whilby; JAM | 23.37	LaShauntea Moore; USA | DQ
Women's 400m	Amantle Montsho; BOT | 50.34	Novlene Williams-Mills; JAM | 50.43	Debbie Dunn; USA | 50.75	Christine Ohuruogu; GBR | 50.98	Lashinda Demus; USA | 51.09	Shericka Williams; JAM | 51.51	Denisa Rosolová; CZE | 51.62	Monica Hargrove; USA | 52.14
Women's 100mH (+1.3 m/s)	Lolo Jones; USA | 12.66	Priscilla Schliep; CAN | 12.72	Perdita Felicien; CAN | 12.72	Danielle Carruthers; USA | 12.74	Delloreen Ennis; JAM | 12.80	Christina Vukicevic; NOR | 12.91	Kellie Wells; USA | 13.00	Carolin Dietrich; GER | 13.14
Women's 3000mSC	Milcah Chemos; KEN | 9:12.66	Gladys Jerotich Kipkemoi; KEN | 9:16.21	Lydia Chebet Rotich; KEN | 9:18.03	Sofia Assefa; ETH | 9:23.45	Wioletta Frankiewicz; POL | 9:25.77	Katarzyna Kowalska; POL | 9:31.16	Ancuţa Bobocel; ROU | 9:34.63	Elizabeth Mueni; KEN | 9:36.92
Women's High Jump	Blanka Vlašić; CRO | 2.01 m	Chaunte Lowe; USA | 2.01 m	Levern Spencer; LCA | 1.94 m	Svetlana Shkolina; RUS | 1.90 m	Ruth Beitia; ESP | 1.90 m	Irina Gordeyeva; RUS | 1.90 m	Emma Green; SWE | 1.90 m	Stine Kufaas; NOR | 1.80 m
Women's Long Jump	Olga Kucherenko; RUS | 6.91 m	Naide Gomes; POR | 6.78 m	Darya Klishina; RUS | 6.77 m	Yelena Sokolova; RUS | 6.68 m	Ivana Vuleta; SRB | 6.65 m	Keila Costa; BRA | 6.42 m	Margrethe Renstrøm; NOR | 6.41 m	Carolina Klüft; SWE | 6.38 m
Women's Discus Throw	Nadine Müller; GER | 63.93 m	Żaneta Glanc; POL | 62.16 m	Aretha D. Thurmond; USA | 61.80 m	Yarisley Collado; CUB | 61.20 m	Nicoleta Grasu; ROU | 60.86 m	Sandra Perković; CRO | 59.71 m	Anna Söderberg; SWE | 58.47 m	Grete Etholm; NOR | 52.66 m

Rome
Event	1st +4 pts	2nd +2 pts	3rd +1 pts	4th ⠀	5th ⠀	6th ⠀	7th ⠀	8th ⠀
Men's 200m (+0.5 m/s)	Walter Dix; USA | 19.86	Wallace Spearmon; USA | 20.05	Paul Hession; IRL | 20.60	Xavier Carter; USA | 20.60	Steve Mullings; JAM | 20.73	Marlon Devonish; GBR | 20.79	Ainsley Waugh; JAM | 20.80	Diego Marani; ITA | 20.91
Men's 400m	Jeremy Wariner; USA | 44.73	Angelo Taylor; USA | 44.74	Christopher Brown; BAH | 45.05	Renny Quow; TTO | 45.52	Michael Bingham; GBR | 46.04	Claudio Licciardello; ITA | 46.32	Jonathan Borlée; BEL | 46.62	David Neville; USA | DNF
Men's 5000m	Imane Merga; ETH | 13:00.12	Sammy Alex Mutahi; KEN | 13:00.12	Moses Ndiema Kipsiro; UGA | 13:00.15	Tariku Bekele; ETH | 13:00.81	Vincent Kiprop Chepkok; KEN | 13:01.37	Mathew Kipkoech Kisorio; KEN | 13:02.72	Teklemariam Medhin; ERI | 13:04.55	Bekana Daba; ETH | 13:05.20
Men's 110mH (+0.9 m/s)	Dayron Robles; CUB | 13.14	Dwight Thomas; JAM | 13.31	Ryan Brathwaite; BAR | 13.34	Ryan Wilson; USA | 13.37	Andrew Turner; GBR | 13.48	David Payne; USA | 13.61	Jason Richardson; USA | 13.65	Petr Svoboda; CZE | 13.86
Men's Long Jump	Dwight Phillips; USA | 8.42 m	Irving Saladino; PAN | 8.13 m	Fabrice Lapierre; AUS | 8.11 m	Brian Johnson; USA | 8.06 m	Ndiss Kaba Badji; SEN | 7.91 m	Chris Tomlinson; GBR | 7.79 m	Michel Tornéus; SWE | 7.79 m	Emanuele Formichetti; ITA | 7.57 m
Men's Shot Put	Christian Cantwell; USA | 21.67 m	Dylan Armstrong; CAN | 21.46 m	Reese Hoffa; USA | 21.15 m	Pavel Lyzhyn; BLR | DQ	Tomasz Majewski; POL | 20.75 m	Dan Taylor; USA | 20.32 m	Ralf Bartels; GER | 20.13 m	Adam Nelson; USA | 19.88 m
Men's Discus Throw	Piotr Małachowski; POL | 68.78 m	Gerd Kanter; EST | 67.69 m	Zoltán Kővágó; HUN | 67.26 m	Robert Harting; GER | 66.33 m	Ehsan Hadadi; IRI | 66.09 m	Gerhard Mayer; AUT | 65.24 m	Erik Cadée; NED | 64.27 m	Virgilijus Alekna; LTU | 63.47 m
Women's 100m (+0.2 m/s)	LaShauntea Moore; USA | 11.04	Chandra Sturrup; BAH | 11.14	Tahesia Harrigan-Scott; IVB | 11.17	Debbie Ferguson-McKenzie; BAH | 11.31	Gloria Asumnu; USA | 11.31	Aleen Bailey; JAM | 11.40	Audrey Alloh; ITA | 11.79	Shelly-Ann Fraser-Pryce; JAM | DQ
Women's 800m	Halima Hachlaf; MAR | 1:58.40	Janeth Jepkosgei; KEN | 1:58.85	Jennifer Meadows; GBR | 1:58.89	Eglė Balčiūnaitė; LTU | 1:59.54	Jemma Simpson; GBR | 1:59.58	Neisha Bernard-Thomas; GRN | 1:59.70	Elisa Cusma; ITA | 2:00.11	Yuliya Krevsun; UKR | 2:00.29
Women's 400mH	Lashinda Demus; USA | 52.82	Kaliese Carter; JAM | 53.48	Natalya Antyukh; RUS | 54.00	Zuzana Hejnová; CZE | 54.13	Josanne Lucas; TTO | 54.84	Anna Jesień; POL | 54.96	Angela Moroşanu; ROU | 55.70	Ajoke Odumosu; NGR | 55.75
Women's 3000mSC	Milcah Chemos; KEN | 9:11.71	Gladys Jerotich Kipkemoi; KEN | 9:13.22	Lydia Chebet Rotich; KEN | 9:19.01	Sofia Assefa; ETH | 9:24.51	Wioletta Frankiewicz; POL | 9:29.68	Mercy Wanjiku Njoroge; KEN | 9:30.78	Katarzyna Kowalska; POL | 9:35.56	Sophie Duarte; FRA | 9:38.55
Women's High Jump	Blanka Vlašić; CRO | 2.03 m	Chaunte Lowe; USA | 2.03 m	Levern Spencer; LCA | 1.95 m	Antonietta di Martino; ITA | 1.95 m	Ruth Beitia; ESP | 1.95 m	Vita Styopina; UKR | 1.90 m	Irina Gordeyeva; RUS | 1.90 m	Svetlana Shkolina; RUS | 1.90 m
Women's Pole Vault	Fabiana Murer; BRA | 4.70 m	Silke Spiegelburg; GER | 4.70 m	Anna Rogowska; POL | 4.60 m	Jiřina Ptáčníková; CZE | 4.60 m	Yuliya Golubchikova; RUS | 4.60 m	Tatyana Polnova; RUS | 4.50 m	Kate Dennison; GBR | 4.50 m	Monika Pyrek; POL | 4.40 m
Women's Triple Jump	Yargelis Savigne; CUB | 14.74 m	Olga Rypakova; KAZ | 14.74 m	Olha Saladukha; UKR | 14.44 m	Anna Pyatykh; RUS | 14.38 m	Simona la Mantia; ITA | 14.17 m	Nadezhda Alyokhina; RUS | 14.05 m	Katja Demut; GER | 13.94 m	Magdelín Martínez; ITA | 13.89 m
Women's Javelin Throw	Barbora Špotáková; CZE | 68.66 m	Sunette Viljoen; RSA | 63.04 m	Vera Markaryan; UKR | 62.44 m	Christina Obergföll; GER | 62.36 m	Linda Stahl; GER | 62.02 m	Martina Ratej; SLO | 62.01 m	Goldie Sayers; GBR | 61.23 m	Jarmila Jurkovičová; CZE | 59.48 m

New York
Event	1st +4 pts	2nd +2 pts	3rd +1 pts	4th ⠀	5th ⠀	6th ⠀	7th ⠀	8th ⠀
Men's 100m (+2.4 m/s)	Richard Thompson; TTO | 9.89	Yohan Blake; JAM | 9.91	Daniel Bailey; ANT | 9.92	Trell Kimmons; USA | 9.92	Ivory Williams; USA | 9.98	Michael Rodgers; USA | 9.99	Churandy Martina; AHO | 10.07	Travis Padgett; USA | 10.07
Men's 800m	Mbulaeni Mulaudzi; RSA | 1:44.38	Nick Symmonds; USA | 1:45.05	Alfred Kirwa Yego; KEN | 1:45.46	Khadevis Robinson; USA | 1:45.77	Karjuan Williams; USA | 1:46.59	Asbel Kiprop; KEN | 1:47.12	Jacob Hernandez; USA | 1:47.51	Gilbert Kipchoge; KEN | 1:47.98
Men's 400mH	Kerron Clement; USA | 47.86	Bershawn Jackson; USA | 47.94	Javier Culson; PUR | 48.47	Félix Sánchez; DOM | 48.69	Isa Phillips; JAM | 48.98	Michael Tinsley; USA | 49.52	LJ van Zyl; RSA | 49.79	Jehue Gordon; TTO | 49.96
Men's 3000mSC	Paul Kipsiele Koech; KEN | 8:10.43	Tarik Langat Akdag; KEN | 8:15.52	Brimin Kiprop Kipruto; KEN | 8:18.92	Daniel Huling; USA | 8:21.68	Steve Slattery; USA | 8:25.81	Ben Bruce; USA | 8:26.23	Anthony Famiglietti; USA | 8:30.84	Brian Olinger; USA | 8:34.38
Men's High Jump	Linus Thörnblad; SWE | 2.30 m	Jesse Williams; USA | 2.30 m	Samson Oni; GBR | 2.27 m	Jaroslav Bába; CZE | 2.27 m	Donald Thomas; BAH | 2.27 m	Dusty Jonas; USA | 2.24 m	Sylwester Bednarek; POL | 2.24 m	Andra Manson; USA | 2.24 m
Men's Pole Vault	Renaud Lavillenie; FRA | 5.85 m	Steven Hooker; AUS | 5.80 m	Przemysław Czerwiński; POL | 5.60 m	Giuseppe Gibilisco; ITA | 5.60 m	Derek Miles; USA | 5.40 m	Malte Mohr; GER | 5.40 m	Michal Balner; CZE | 5.40 m	Jeremy Scott; USA | 5.20 m
Men's Triple Jump	Teddy Tamgho; FRA | 17.98 m	Christian Olsson; SWE | 17.62 m	Phillips Idowu; GBR | 17.31 m	Leevan Sands; BAH | 16.80 m	Randy Lewis; GRN | 16.76 m	Samyr Laine; HAI | 16.60 m	Kenta Bell; USA | 16.46 m	Brandon Roulhac; USA | 16.01 m
Men's Javelin Throw	Andreas Thorkildsen; NOR | 87.02 m	Petr Frydrych; CZE | 85.04 m	Tero Pitkämäki; FIN | 82.57 m	Antti Ruuskanen; FIN | 81.34 m	Vadims Vasiļevskis; LAT | 77.48 m	Chris Hill; USA | 73.48 m	Corey White; USA | 66.01 m	Bobby Smith; USA | 65.02 m
Women's 200m (+1.4 m/s)	Veronica Campbell-Brown; JAM | 21.98	Allyson Felix; USA | 22.03	Bianca Knight; USA | 22.59	Kelly-Ann Baptiste; TTO | 22.82	Ashlee Kidd; USA | 23.16	Emily Freeman; GBR | 23.37	Charonda Williams; USA | 23.41	
Women's 1500m	Nancy Jebet Langat; KEN | 4:01.60	Meseret Defar; ETH | 4:02.00	Gelete Burka; ETH | 4:03.35	Jenny Simpson; USA | 4:03.63	Shannon Rowbury; USA | 4:04.00	Morgan Uceny; USA | 4:04.01	Christin Wurth-Thomas; USA | 4:05.56	Anna Willard; USA | 4:05.96
Women's 5000m	Tirunesh Dibaba; ETH | 15:11.34	Sentayehu Ejigu; ETH | 15:12.99	Sule Utura; ETH | 15:16.61	Sally Kipyego; KEN | 15:18.46	Amy Yoder Begley; USA | 15:18.96	Megan Wright; CAN | 15:19.33	Pauline Chemning Korikwiang; KEN | 15:23.82	Aheza Kiros; ETH | 15:29.18
Women's 100mH (+2.0 m/s)	Lolo Jones; USA | 12.55	Perdita Felicien; CAN | 12.58	Ginnie Crawford; USA | 12.63	Priscilla Schliep; CAN | 12.67	Delloreen Ennis; JAM | 12.71	Vonette Dixon; JAM | 12.75	Susanna Kallur; SWE | 12.78	Sally Pearson; AUS | 12.83
Women's Long Jump	Brianna Glenn; USA | 6.78 m	Ruky Abdulai; CAN | 6.66 m	Funmi Jimoh; USA | 6.65 m	Ksenija Balta; EST | 6.59 m	Akiba McKinney; USA | 6.43 m	Karin Mey Melis; TUR | 6.42 m	Keila Costa; BRA | 6.27 m	Tianna Madison; USA | 6.27 m
Women's Shot Put	Valerie Adams; NZL | 19.93 m	Natalya Mikhnevich; BLR | DQ	Jillian Camarena-Williams; USA | 18.99 m	Petra Lammert; GER | 18.36 m	Cleopatra Borel; TTO | 17.88 m	Michelle Carter; USA | 17.83 m	Sarah Stevens-Walker; USA | 17.81 m	Kristin Heaston; USA | 15.75 m
Women's Discus Throw	Sandra Perković; CRO | 61.96 m	Aretha D. Thurmond; USA | 61.19 m	Věra Pospíšilová-Cechlová; CZE | 60.71 m	Gia Lewis-Smallwood; USA | 59.70 m	Becky Breisch; USA | 59.55 m	Summer Pierson; USA | 58.75 m	Anna Jelmini; USA | 58.67 m	Stephanie Brown-Trafton; USA | 55.67 m

Eugene
Event	1st +4 pts	2nd +2 pts	3rd +1 pts	4th ⠀	5th ⠀	6th ⠀	7th ⠀	8th ⠀
Men's 200m (+1.8 m/s)	Walter Dix; USA | 19.72	Tyson Gay; USA | 19.76	Ryan Bailey; USA | 20.17	Xavier Carter; USA | 20.30	Richard Thompson; TTO | 20.48	Shawn Crawford; USA | 20.50	Churandy Martina; AHO | 20.52	Jaysuma Saidy Ndure; NOR | 20.67
Men's Mile	Asbel Kiprop; KEN | 3:49.75	Amine Laalou; MAR | 3:50.22	Mekonnen Gebremedhin; ETH | 3:50.68	Daniel Kipchirchir Komen; KEN | 3:50.70	Andrew Wheating; USA | 3:51.74	Nicholas Kiptanui Kemboi; KEN | 3:52.84	Lopez Lomong; USA | 3:53.18	Mohamed Moustaoui; MAR | 3:53.70
Men's 5000m	Tariku Bekele; ETH | 12:58.93	Dejen Gebremeskel; ETH | 12:59.30	Imane Merga; ETH | 13:00.18	Eliud Kipchoge; KEN | 13:01.17	Bekana Daba; ETH | 13:05.35	Mathew Kipkoech Kisorio; KEN | 13:07.26	Chris Solinsky; USA | 13:08.11	Daniel Lemashon Salel; KEN | 13:09.80
Men's 110mH (+1.6 m/s)	David Oliver; USA | 12.90	Ryan Wilson; USA | 13.16	Ronnie Ash; USA | 13.19	David Payne; USA | 13.24	Artur Noga; POL | 13.29	Antwon Hicks; USA | 13.29	Jason Richardson; USA | 13.50	Ryan Brathwaite; BAR | 13.53
Men's Long Jump	Irving Saladino; PAN | 8.46 m	Dwight Phillips; USA | 8.41 m	Jinzhe Li; CHN | 8.29 m	Trevell Quinley; USA | 8.19 m	Fabrice Lapierre; AUS | 8.17 m	Brian Johnson; USA | 7.85 m	Yahya Berrabah; MAR | 7.77 m	Sebastian Bayer; GER | 7.65 m
Men's Shot Put	Christian Cantwell; USA | 22.41 m	Dylan Armstrong; CAN | 21.33 m	Adam Nelson; USA | 21.16 m	Ryan Whiting; USA | 20.93 m	Tomasz Majewski; POL | 20.90 m	Reese Hoffa; USA | 20.75 m	Cory Martin; USA | 20.50 m	Dan Taylor; USA | 20.47 m
Men's Discus Throw	Piotr Małachowski; POL | 67.66 m	Zoltán Kővágó; HUN | 67.55 m	Jason Young; USA | 66.95 m	Casey Malone; USA | 66.03 m	Gerd Kanter; EST | 65.75 m	Virgilijus Alekna; LTU | 63.55 m	Jarred Rome; USA | 62.46 m	Ian Waltz; USA | 60.70 m
Women's 100m (+0.8 m/s)	Veronica Campbell-Brown; JAM | 10.78	Carmelita Jeter; USA | 10.83	LaShauntea Moore; USA | 10.99	Blessing Okagbare; NGR | 11.03	Sherone Simpson; JAM | 11.14	Tahesia Harrigan-Scott; IVB | 11.16	Chandra Sturrup; BAH | 11.19	Shelly-Ann Fraser-Pryce; JAM | DQ
Women's 400m	Allyson Felix; USA | 50.27	Amantle Montsho; BOT | 50.30	Shericka Williams; JAM | 50.31	Debbie Dunn; USA | 50.56	Antonina Krivoshapka; RUS | 50.60	Natasha Hastings; USA | 50.64	Novlene Williams-Mills; JAM | 51.11	Keshia Kirtz; USA | 51.60
Women's 800m	Mariya Savinova; RUS | 1:57.56	Nancy Jebet Langat; KEN | 1:57.75	Janeth Jepkosgei; KEN | 1:57.84	Phoebe Wright; USA | 1:58.22	Alysia Montaño; USA | 1:58.84	Anna Willard; USA | 1:59.42	Kenia Sinclair; JAM | 1:59.55	Maryam Yusuf Jamal; BRN | 1:59.89
Women's 400mH	Lashinda Demus; USA | 53.03	Kaliese Carter; JAM | 53.78	Josanne Lucas; TTO | 55.08	Sheena Johnson-Tosta; USA | 55.53	Ajoke Odumosu; NGR | 55.76	Nicole Leach; USA | 56.18	Fawn Dorr; USA | 57.32	Ebony Collins; USA | 58.36
Women's 3000mSC	Milcah Chemos; KEN | 9:26.70	Marta Domínguez; ESP | DQ	Sofia Assefa; ETH | 9:30.05	Korene Hinds; JAM | 9:32.20	Bridget Franek; USA | 9:32.35	Barbara Parker; GBR | 9:35.17	Lisa Aguilera; USA | 9:45.50	Nicole Bush; USA | 9:53.34
Women's Pole Vault	Fabiana Murer; BRA | 4.58 m	Anna Rogowska; POL | 4.58 m	Yuliya Golubchikova; RUS | 4.48 m	Lacy Janson; USA | 4.48 m	Aleksandra Kiryashova; RUS | 4.48 m	Chelsea Johnson; USA | 4.28 m	Monika Pyrek; POL | NH m	Jennifer Suhr; USA | NH m
Women's Triple Jump	Nadezhda Alyokhina; RUS | 14.62 m	Olga Rypakova; KAZ | 14.45 m	Erica McLain; USA | 14.33 m	Tabia Charles; CAN | 13.99 m	Toni Smith; USA | 13.81 m	Shakeema Walker-Welsch; USA | 13.62 m	Limei Xie; CHN | NM	Anastasiya Potapova; RUS | NM
Women's Javelin Throw	Kara Winger; USA | 65.90 m	Martina Ratej; SLO | 64.40 m	Barbora Špotáková; CZE | 61.12 m	Rachel Buciarski; USA | 58.42 m	Madara Palameika; LAT | 53.37 m	Alicia Deshasier; USA | 50.77 m		

Lausanne
Event	1st +4 pts	2nd +2 pts	3rd +1 pts	4th ⠀	5th ⠀	6th ⠀	7th ⠀	8th ⠀
Men's 200m (+0.4 m/s)	Walter Dix; USA | 19.86	Churandy Martina; AHO | 20.08	Xavier Carter; USA | 20.15	Paul Hession; IRL | 20.46	Ainsley Waugh; JAM | 20.46	Shawn Crawford; USA | 20.69	Jordan Boase; USA | 20.79	Marc Schneeberger; SUI | 20.87
Men's 400m	Jeremy Wariner; USA | 44.57	LeJerald Betters; USA | 44.70	Jermaine Gonzales; JAM | 44.72	Jonathan Borlée; BEL | 44.94	Calvin Smith; USA | 45.39	David Neville; USA | 45.39	Renny Quow; TTO | 45.40	Greg Nixon; USA | 46.01
Men's 800m	David Rudisha; KEN | 1:43.25	Mbulaeni Mulaudzi; RSA | 1:43.58	Alfred Kirwa Yego; KEN | 1:43.97	Marcin Lewandowski; POL | 1:44.30	Michael Rimmer; GBR | 1:44.49	Jackson Mumbwa Kivuva; KEN | 1:44.54	Richard Kiplagat; KEN | 1:44.77	Bram Som; NED | 1:45.25
Men's 400mH	Bershawn Jackson; USA | 47.62	Angelo Taylor; USA | 47.96	Félix Sánchez; DOM | 48.17	Javier Culson; PUR | 48.37	David Greene; GBR | 48.49	Isa Phillips; JAM | 48.68	Michael Tinsley; USA | 49.62	Kerron Clement; USA | 50.41
Men's 3000mSC	Brimin Kiprop Kipruto; KEN | 8:01.62	Benjamin Kiplagat; UGA | 8:03.81	Paul Kipsiele Koech; KEN | 8:11.65	Daniel Huling; USA | 8:13.29	Richard Kipkemboi Mateelong; KEN | 8:16.84	Tarik Langat Akdag; KEN | 8:17.36	Roba Gari; ETH | 8:18.35	Ángel Mullera; ESP | 8:42.17
Men's High Jump	Ivan Ukhov; RUS | 2.33 m	Yaroslav Rybakov; RUS | 2.33 m	Kyriakos Ioannou; CYP | 2.30 m	Donald Thomas; BAH | 2.30 m	Linus Thörnblad; SWE | 2.27 m	Jesse Williams; USA | 2.27 m	Dusty Jonas; USA | 2.27 m	Aleksey Dmitrik; RUS | 2.27 m
Men's Pole Vault	Renaud Lavillenie; FRA | 5.85 m	Steven Hooker; AUS | 5.80 m	Malte Mohr; GER | 5.80 m	Damiel Dossevi; FRA | 5.70 m	Maksym Mazuryk; UKR | 5.60 m	Giuseppe Gibilisco; ITA | 5.60 m	Hendrik Gruber; GER | 5.60 m	Sergey Kucheryanu; RUS | 5.50 m
Men's Javelin Throw	Andreas Thorkildsen; NOR | 87.03 m	Tero Pitkämäki; FIN | 84.71 m	Guillermo Martínez; CUB | 82.40 m	Ainars Kovals; LAT | 82.30 m	Matthias de Zordo; GER | 82.02 m	Jarrod Bannister; AUS | 81.33 m	Ari Mannio; FIN | 81.24 m	Vítězslav Veselý; CZE | 78.53 m
Women's 100m (−0.6 m/s)	Carmelita Jeter; USA | 10.99	Sherone Simpson; JAM | 11.15	Chandra Sturrup; BAH | 11.18	Debbie Ferguson-McKenzie; BAH | 11.27	Sheri-Ann Brooks; JAM | 11.35	LaShauntea Moore; USA | 11.40	Alexandria Anderson; USA | 11.42	Shelly-Ann Fraser-Pryce; JAM | DNS
Women's 1500m	Gelete Burka; ETH | 3:59.28	Ibtissam Lakhouad; MAR | 3:59.35	Nancy Jebet Langat; KEN | 4:00.13	Lisa Dobriskey; GBR | 4:01.83	Morgan Uceny; USA | 4:02.40	Mimi Belete; BRN | 4:02.64	Viola Jelagat Kibiwot; KEN | 4:03.39	Christin Wurth-Thomas; USA | 4:03.44
Women's 3000m	Vivian Jepkemei Cheruiyot; KEN | 8:34.58	Meseret Defar; ETH | 8:36.09	Sentayehu Ejigu; ETH | 8:37.20	Ines Chenonge; KEN | 8:37.63	Meselech Melkamu; ETH | 8:40.08	Sylvia Jebiwot Kibet; KEN | 8:40.47	Florence Kiplagat; KEN | 8:40.72	Pauline Chemning Korikwiang; KEN | 8:41.11
Women's 100mH (+0.3 m/s)	Priscilla Schliep; CAN | 12.56	Carolin Dietrich; GER | 12.57	Delloreen Ennis; JAM | 12.73	Perdita Felicien; CAN | 12.75	Vonette Dixon; JAM | 12.91	Kellie Wells; USA | 12.93	Anay Tejeda; CUB | 12.95	Ginnie Crawford; USA | DNF
Women's Long Jump	Brittney Reese; USA | 6.94 m	Naide Gomes; POR | 6.80 m	Tatyana Kotova; RUS | 6.70 m	Brianna Glenn; USA | 6.64 m	Olga Kucherenko; RUS | 6.61 m	Nastassia Mironchyk-Ivanova; BLR | 6.57 m	Funmi Jimoh; USA | 6.45 m	Clélia Rard-Reuse; SUI | 6.32 m
Women's Triple Jump	Yargelis Savigne; CUB | 14.99 m	Olga Rypakova; KAZ | 14.60 m	Svetlana Bolshakova; BEL | 14.43 m	Nadezhda Alyokhina; RUS | 14.39 m	Athanasia Perra; GRE | DQ	Olha Saladukha; UKR | 14.28 m	Dana Velďáková; SVK | 14.20 m	Simona la Mantia; ITA | 14.14 m
Women's Discus Throw	Yarelis Barrios; CUB | 65.92 m	Becky Breisch; USA | 64.53 m	Dani Stevens; AUS | 62.05 m	Żaneta Glanc; POL | 61.53 m	Nadine Müller; GER | 61.14 m	Aretha D. Thurmond; USA | 60.77 m	Sandra Perković; CRO | 60.18 m	Stephanie Brown-Trafton; USA | 58.81 m

Birmingham
Event	1st +4 pts	2nd +2 pts	3rd +1 pts	4th ⠀	5th ⠀	6th ⠀	7th ⠀	8th ⠀
Men's 200m (−0.9 m/s)	Walter Dix; USA | 20.26	Wallace Spearmon; USA | 20.29	Jaysuma Saidy Ndure; NOR | 20.31	Angelo Taylor; USA | 20.50	Churandy Martina; AHO | 20.62	Marlon Devonish; GBR | 20.68	Calvin Smith; USA | 21.11	Craig Pickering; GBR | 21.34
Men's 1500m	Asbel Kiprop; KEN | 3:33.34	Augustine Kiprono Choge; KEN | 3:33.51	Leonel Manzano; USA | 3:33.51	Mekonnen Gebremedhin; ETH | 3:33.96	Andrew Baddeley; GBR | 3:34.50	Geoffrey Kipkoech Rono; KEN | 3:34.51	Thomas Lancashire; GBR | 3:34.87	Peter van der Westhuizen; RSA | 3:35.97
Men's 5000m	Vincent Kiprop Chepkok; KEN | 13:00.20	Eliud Kipchoge; KEN | 13:00.24	Imane Merga; ETH | 13:00.48	Tariku Bekele; ETH | 13:01.32	Moses Ndiema Kipsiro; UGA | 13:02.10	Mathew Kipkoech Kisorio; KEN | 13:04.79	Mo Farah; GBR | 13:05.66	Micah Kemboi Kogo; KEN | 13:07.62
Men's 3000mSC	Linus Kipwambok Chumba; KEN | 8:19.72	Michael Kipyego; KEN | 8:21.91	Ben Bruce; USA | 8:22.88	Luke Gunn; GBR | 8:28.89	Youcef Abdi; AUS | 8:28.93	Bisluke Kipkorir Kiplagat; KEN | 8:36.52	Kyle Alcorn; USA | 8:38.22	Ruben Ramolefi; RSA | 8:41.80
Men's High Jump	Linus Thörnblad; SWE | 2.29 m	Osku Torro; FIN | 2.26 m	Jesse Williams; USA | 2.26 m	Jaroslav Bába; CZE | 2.26 m	Donald Thomas; BAH | 2.26 m	Samson Oni; GBR | 2.23 m	Martyn Bernard; GBR | 2.20 m	Dusty Jonas; USA | 2.20 m
Men's Long Jump	Fabrice Lapierre; AUS | 8.20 m	Michel Tornéus; SWE | 8.01 m	Irving Saladino; PAN | 7.96 m	Tommi Evilä; FIN | 7.95 m	Morten Jensen; DEN | 7.85 m	Chris Tomlinson; GBR | 7.80 m	Greg Rutherford; GBR | 7.70 m	Chris Noffke; AUS | 7.64 m
Men's Triple Jump	Phillips Idowu; GBR | 17.38 m	Randy Lewis; GRN | 17.29 m	Alexis Copello; CUB | 17.09 m	Leevan Sands; BAH | 16.83 m	Dmitrij Vaľukevič; SVK | 16.81 m	Samyr Laine; HAI | 16.67 m	Kenta Bell; USA | 16.58 m	Ade Babatunde; GBR | 15.50 m
Men's Discus Throw	Piotr Małachowski; POL | 69.83 m	Zoltán Kővágó; HUN | 67.02 m	Casey Malone; USA | 65.60 m	Märt Israel; EST | 65.46 m	Gerhard Mayer; AUT | 64.49 m	Martin Wierig; GER | 63.50 m	Brett Morse; GBR | 61.69 m	Erik Cadée; NED | 61.28 m
Women's 100m (+0.3 m/s)	Carmelita Jeter; USA | 10.95	Kelly-Ann Baptiste; TTO | 11.00	Sherone Simpson; JAM | 11.02	Shalonda Solomon; USA | 11.24	Debbie Ferguson-McKenzie; BAH | 11.25	Sheri-Ann Brooks; JAM | 11.28	Carrie Russell; JAM | 11.35	Mikele Barber; USA | 11.52
Women's 400m	Shericka Williams; JAM | 50.44	Debbie Dunn; USA | 50.66	Novlene Williams-Mills; JAM | 50.90	Natasha Hastings; USA | 51.15	Denisa Rosolová; CZE | 51.76	Shana Cox; USA | 52.33	Nicola Sanders; GBR | 52.89	Amantle Montsho; BOT | DNS
Women's 800m	Alysia Montaño; USA | 1:59.84	Halima Hachlaf; MAR | 2:00.49	Yuliya Krevsun; UKR | 2:00.67	Christin Wurth-Thomas; USA | 2:00.75	Lucia Hrivnák Klocová; SVK | 2:00.97	Jennifer Meadows; GBR | 2:01.07	Marilyn Okoro; GBR | 2:01.55	Janeth Jepkosgei; KEN | 2:01.60
Women's 400mH	Kaliese Carter; JAM | 54.10	Zuzana Hejnová; CZE | 54.83	Angela Moroşanu; ROU | 54.87	Perri Shakes-Drayton; GBR | 55.67	Sheena Johnson-Tosta; USA | 55.92	Eilidh Doyle; GBR | 56.13	Dominique Darden; USA | 58.15	Nickiesha Wilson; JAM | 58.50
Women's Pole Vault	Svetlana Feofanova; RUS | 4.71 m	Fabiana Murer; BRA | 4.61 m	Silke Spiegelburg; GER | 4.61 m	Jillian Schwartz; ISR | 4.51 m	Kate Dennison; GBR | 4.41 m	Lacy Janson; USA | 4.41 m	Jiřina Ptáčníková; CZE | 4.41 m	Henrietta Paxton; GBR | 4.21 m
Women's Shot Put	Nadezhda Ostapchuk; BLR | DQ	Valerie Adams; NZL | 20.06 m	Nadine Kleinert; GER | 19.01 m	Natalya Mikhnevich; BLR | DQ	Denise Hinrichs; GER | 18.15 m	Jillian Camarena-Williams; USA | 17.68 m	Michelle Carter; USA | 17.56 m	Eden Francis; GBR | 15.11 m
Women's Javelin Throw	Sunette Viljoen; RSA | 64.32 m	Kara Winger; USA | 63.11 m	Barbora Špotáková; CZE | 62.02 m	Ásdís Hjálmsdóttir; ISL | 60.72 m	Jarmila Jurkovičová; CZE | 56.21 m	Laura Whittingham; GBR | 51.90 m	Jessica Ennis-Hill; GBR | 46.15 m	Tatjana Mirković; SRB | DNS m

Paris
Event	1st +4 pts	2nd +2 pts	3rd +1 pts	4th ⠀	5th ⠀	6th ⠀	7th ⠀	8th ⠀
Men's 100m (−0.3 m/s)	Usain Bolt; JAM | 9.84	Asafa Powell; JAM | 9.91	Yohan Blake; JAM | 9.95	Daniel Bailey; ANT | 10.00	Christophe Lemaitre; FRA | 10.09	Churandy Martina; AHO | 10.09	Trell Kimmons; USA | 10.14	Martial Mbandjock; FRA | 10.20
Men's 400m	Jeremy Wariner; USA | 44.49	Jermaine Gonzales; JAM | 44.63	Jonathan Borlée; BEL | 44.77	Michael Bingham; GBR | 45.53	Leslie Djhone; FRA | 45.58	Greg Nixon; USA | 45.81	Renny Quow; TTO | 45.81	David Neville; USA | 45.83
Men's 800m	Abubaker Kaki; SUD | 1:43.50	Mbulaeni Mulaudzi; RSA | 1:44.11	Bram Som; NED | 1:44.58	Andrew Wheating; USA | 1:44.62	Jackson Mumbwa Kivuva; KEN | 1:44.62	Nick Symmonds; USA | 1:44.93	Augustine Kiprono Choge; KEN | 1:45.61	Richard Kiplagat; KEN | 1:45.81
Men's 110mH (+0.5 m/s)	David Oliver; USA | 12.89	Ryan Wilson; USA | 13.12	Ronnie Ash; USA | 13.21	Joel Brown; USA | 13.25	Dwight Thomas; JAM | 13.30	Andrew Turner; GBR | 13.37	Dimitri Bascou; FRA | 13.45	John Yarbrough; USA | 13.57
Men's 3000mSC	Brimin Kiprop Kipruto; KEN | 8:00.90	Paul Kipsiele Koech; KEN | 8:02.07	Ezekiel Kemboi; KEN | 8:03.79	Benjamin Kiplagat; UGA | 8:04.48	Richard Kipkemboi Mateelong; KEN | 8:06.44	Tarik Langat Akdag; KEN | 8:14.26	Elijah Chelimo; KEN | 8:17.79	Tomasz Szymkowiak; POL | 8:18.23
Men's Pole Vault	Renaud Lavillenie; FRA | 5.91 m	Derek Miles; USA | 5.70 m	Łukasz Michalski; POL | 5.70 m	Maksym Mazuryk; UKR | 5.70 m	Michal Balner; CZE | 5.60 m	Przemysław Czerwiński; POL | 5.60 m	Romain Mesnil; FRA | 5.60 m	Damiel Dossevi; FRA | 5.40 m
Men's Triple Jump	David Girat; CUB | 17.49 m	Alexis Copello; CUB | 17.45 m	Viktor Kuznyetsov; UKR | 17.21 m	Phillips Idowu; GBR | 17.20 m	Yoandri Betanzos; CUB | 16.99 m	Randy Lewis; GRN | 16.81 m	Marian Oprea; ROU | 16.80 m	Fabrizio Donato; ITA | 16.74 m
Men's Javelin Throw	Andreas Thorkildsen; NOR | 87.50 m	Teemu Wirkkala; FIN | 83.77 m	Tero Pitkämäki; FIN | 83.33 m	Jarrod Bannister; AUS | 80.13 m	Ari Mannio; FIN | 79.13 m	Oleksandr Pyatnytsya; UKR | 79.08 m	Stuart Farquhar; NZL | 77.93 m	Vadims Vasiļevskis; LAT | 75.44 m
Women's 200m (±0.0 m/s)	Allyson Felix; USA | 22.14	Shalonda Solomon; USA | 22.55	Debbie Ferguson-McKenzie; BAH | 22.62	Sherone Simpson; JAM | 22.65	Kelly-Ann Baptiste; TTO | 22.78	Bianca Knight; USA | 22.83	Porscha Lucas; USA | 22.85	Lina Jacques-Sébastien; FRA | 23.12
Women's 1500m	Anna Alminova; RUS | DQ	Christin Wurth-Thomas; USA | 3:59.59	Hind Dehiba Chahyd; FRA | 3:59.76	Lisa Dobriskey; GBR | 3:59.79	Fanjanteino Felix; FRA | 4:01.17	Shannon Rowbury; USA | 4:01.30	Mimi Belete; BRN | 4:01.59	Stephanie Twell; GBR | 4:03.71
Women's 5000m	Vivian Jepkemei Cheruiyot; KEN | 14:27.41	Sentayehu Ejigu; ETH | 14:28.39	Elvan Abeylegesse; TUR | 14:31.52	Meselech Melkamu; ETH | 14:32.73	Jessica Augusto; POR | 14:37.07	Ines Chenonge; KEN | 14:39.19	Margaret Wangari Muriuki; KEN | 14:50.73	Molly Huddle; USA | 14:51.84
Women's High Jump	Blanka Vlašić; CRO | 2.02 m	Chaunte Lowe; USA | 2.00 m	Svetlana Shkolina; RUS | 1.96 m	Nadiya Dusanova; UZB | 1.93 m	Vita Styopina; UKR | 1.90 m	Irina Gordeyeva; RUS | 1.90 m	Emma Green; SWE | 1.82 m	Mélanie Melfort; FRA | 1.82 m
Women's Long Jump	Brittney Reese; USA | 6.79 m	Naide Gomes; POR | 6.73 m	Yargelis Savigne; CUB | 6.73 m	Darya Klishina; RUS | 6.61 m	Tatyana Kotova; RUS | 6.58 m	Olga Kucherenko; RUS | 6.56 m	Funmi Jimoh; USA | 6.56 m	Éloyse Lesueur-Aymonin; FRA | 6.53 m
Women's Shot Put	Nadezhda Ostapchuk; BLR | DQ	Valerie Adams; NZL | 20.13 m	Natalya Mikhnevich; BLR | DQ	Misleydis González; CUB | 18.83 m	Nadine Kleinert; GER | 18.43 m	Jillian Camarena-Williams; USA | 18.30 m	Michelle Carter; USA | 18.17 m	Jessica Cérival; FRA | 17.53 m
Women's Discus Throw	Yarelis Barrios; CUB | 65.53 m	Nicoleta Grasu; ROU | 63.78 m	Sandra Perković; CRO | 63.62 m	Dani Stevens; AUS | 62.10 m	Nadine Müller; GER | 61.73 m	Becky Breisch; USA | 60.86 m	Aretha D. Thurmond; USA | 60.83 m	Věra Pospíšilová-Cechlová; CZE | 59.36 m

Monaco
Event	1st +4 pts	2nd +2 pts	3rd +1 pts	4th ⠀	5th ⠀	6th ⠀	7th ⠀	8th ⠀
Men's 200m (+0.1 m/s)	Tyson Gay; USA | 19.72	Yohan Blake; JAM | 19.78	Wallace Spearmon; USA | 19.93	Xavier Carter; USA | 20.14	Shawn Crawford; USA | 20.53	Ainsley Waugh; JAM | 20.70	Aaron Armstrong; TTO | 20.94	Ryan Bailey; USA | 21.45
Men's 400m	Jermaine Gonzales; JAM | 44.40	Ricardo Chambers; JAM | 44.54	Christopher Brown; BAH | 45.05	Renny Quow; TTO | 45.10	LeJerald Betters; USA | 45.31	Kévin Borlée; BEL | 45.46	David Neville; USA | 45.65	Greg Nixon; USA | 46.38
Men's 1500m	Silas Kiplagat; KEN | 3:29.27	Amine Laalou; MAR | 3:29.53	Augustine Kiprono Choge; KEN | 3:30.22	Andrew Wheating; USA | 3:30.90	Ryan Gregson; AUS | 3:31.06	Lopez Lomong; USA | 3:32.20	Bernard Lagat; USA | 3:32.51	Taoufik Makhloufi; ALG | 3:32.94
Men's 110mH (+1.0 m/s)	David Oliver; USA | 13.01	Ryan Wilson; USA | 13.13	Dwight Thomas; JAM | 13.29	Petr Svoboda; CZE | 13.30	Jason Richardson; USA | 13.34	Garfield Darien; FRA | 13.41	Joel Brown; USA | 13.54	Dimitri Bascou; FRA | DNF
Men's High Jump	Ivan Ukhov; RUS | 2.34 m	Jesse Williams; USA | 2.28 m	Andrey Silnov; RUS | 2.28 m	Yaroslav Rybakov; RUS | 2.28 m	Dusty Jonas; USA | 2.25 m	Raul Spank; GER | 2.25 m	Mickaël Hanany; FRA | 2.25 m	Sylwester Bednarek; POL | 2.22 m
Men's Long Jump	Dwight Phillips; USA | 8.46 m	Fabrice Lapierre; AUS | 8.18 m	Pavel Shalin; RUS | 8.15 m	Kafétien Gomis; FRA | 8.11 m	Irving Saladino; PAN | 8.09 m	Michel Tornéus; SWE | 7.96 m	Tommi Evilä; FIN | 7.94 m	Salim Sdiri; FRA | 6.41 m
Men's Discus Throw	Gerd Kanter; EST | 67.81 m	Zoltán Kővágó; HUN | 66.89 m	Piotr Małachowski; POL | 66.45 m	Virgilijus Alekna; LTU | 65.26 m	Casey Malone; USA | 65.13 m	Märt Israel; EST | 65.01 m	Mario Pestano; ESP | 64.98 m	Ehsan Hadadi; IRI | 63.49 m
Women's 100m (+0.4 m/s)	Carmelita Jeter; USA | 10.82	Veronica Campbell-Brown; JAM | 10.98	Kelly-Ann Baptiste; TTO | 11.03	Sherone Simpson; JAM | 11.03	Blessing Okagbare; NGR | 11.10	Shalonda Solomon; USA | 11.14	Carrie Russell; JAM | 11.22	Debbie Ferguson-McKenzie; BAH | 11.22
Women's 800m	Alysia Montaño; USA | 1:57.34	Jemma Simpson; GBR | 1:58.74	Anna Willard; USA | 1:58.89	Halima Hachlaf; MAR | 1:59.04	Elisa Cusma; ITA | 1:59.13	Phoebe Wright; USA | 1:59.21	Eglė Balčiūnaitė; LTU | 1:59.29	Kenia Sinclair; JAM | 1:59.76
Women's 3000m	Sentayehu Ejigu; ETH | 8:28.41	Maryam Yusuf Jamal; BRN | 8:29.20	Shannon Rowbury; USA | 8:31.38	Mimi Belete; BRN | 8:32.18	Sylvia Jebiwot Kibet; KEN | 8:37.48	Margaret Wangari Muriuki; KEN | 8:37.97	Belaynesh Oljira; ETH | 8:40.73	Viola Jelagat Kibiwot; KEN | 8:45.28
Women's 400mH	Kaliese Carter; JAM | 53.63	Natalya Antyukh; RUS | 54.24	Sheena Johnson-Tosta; USA | 54.52	Lashinda Demus; USA | 54.54	Ajoke Odumosu; NGR | 54.68	Yevgeniya Isakova; RUS | 55.17	Josanne Lucas; TTO | 55.92	Dominique Darden; USA | 56.79
Women's Pole Vault	Fabiana Murer; BRA | 4.80 m	Svetlana Feofanova; RUS | 4.70 m	Lacy Janson; USA | 4.60 m	Silke Spiegelburg; GER | 4.60 m	Yuliya Golubchikova; RUS | 4.60 m	Jiřina Ptáčníková; CZE | 4.60 m	Anna Rogowska; POL | 4.60 m	Jillian Schwartz; ISR | 4.50 m
Women's Triple Jump	Yargelis Savigne; CUB | 15.09 m	Olga Rypakova; KAZ | 14.78 m	Anna Pyatykh; RUS | 14.43 m	Dana Velďáková; SVK | 14.23 m	Petya Dacheva; BUL | 14.18 m	Snežana Vukmirovič; SLO | 14.16 m	Yekaterina Kayukova-Chernenko; RUS | 13.85 m	Erica McLain; USA | 13.78 m
Women's Shot Put	Nadezhda Ostapchuk; BLR | DQ	Valerie Adams; NZL | 20.20 m	Natalya Mikhnevich; BLR | DQ	Misleydis González; CUB | 19.07 m	Michelle Carter; USA | 18.70 m	Jillian Camarena-Williams; USA | 18.60 m	Christina Schwanitz; GER | 18.00 m	
Women's Javelin Throw	Barbora Špotáková; CZE | 65.76 m	Kara Winger; USA | 64.21 m	Sunette Viljoen; RSA | 59.93 m	Madara Palameika; LAT | 59.64 m	Ásdís Hjálmsdóttir; ISL | 59.55 m	Mareike Rittweg; GER | 57.18 m	Rachel Buciarski; USA | 55.95 m	Elisabeth Pauer; AUT | 55.33 m

Stockholm
Event	1st +4 pts	2nd +2 pts	3rd +1 pts	4th ⠀	5th ⠀	6th ⠀	7th ⠀	8th ⠀
Men's 100m (±0.0 m/s)	Tyson Gay; USA | 9.84	Usain Bolt; JAM | 9.97	Richard Thompson; TTO | 10.10	Trell Kimmons; USA | 10.11	Mario Forsythe; JAM | 10.20	Michael Rodgers; USA | 10.21	Travis Padgett; USA | 10.22	Rae Monzavous Edwards; USA | 10.29
Men's 800m	Marcin Lewandowski; POL | 1:45.06	Michael Rimmer; GBR | 1:45.11	Jackson Mumbwa Kivuva; KEN | 1:45.28	Boaz Kiplagat Lalang; KEN | 1:45.31	Nick Symmonds; USA | 1:45.32	Leonel Manzano; USA | 1:45.41	Alfred Kirwa Yego; KEN | 1:46.41	Andrew Wheating; USA | 1:46.51
Men's 5000m	Mark Kosgei Kiptoo; KEN | 12:53.46	Dejen Gebremeskel; ETH | 12:53.56	Imane Merga; ETH | 12:53.58	Eliud Kipchoge; KEN | 12:54.36	Chris Solinsky; USA | 12:55.53	Vincent Kiprop Chepkok; KEN | 12:58.17	Titus Kipjumba Mbishei; KEN | 13:00.04	Augustine Kiprono Choge; KEN | 13:04.64
Men's 400mH	Bershawn Jackson; USA | 47.65	Javier Culson; PUR | 48.50	Angelo Taylor; USA | 49.57	Jehue Gordon; TTO | 49.66	Michael Tinsley; USA | 49.83	Richard Yates; GBR | 49.93	Isa Phillips; JAM | 50.00	Félix Sánchez; DOM | DQ
Men's Triple Jump	Teddy Tamgho; FRA | 17.36 m	Christian Olsson; SWE | 17.32 m	Alexis Copello; CUB | 17.22 m	Viktor Kuznyetsov; UKR | 16.81 m	Randy Lewis; GRN | 16.81 m	David Girat; CUB | 16.74 m	Aleksey Fyodorov; RUS | 16.74 m	Momchil Karailiev; BUL | 16.54 m
Men's Shot Put	Christian Cantwell; USA | 22.09 m	Tomasz Majewski; POL | 21.01 m	Cory Martin; USA | 20.73 m	Reese Hoffa; USA | 20.68 m	Dylan Armstrong; CAN | 20.61 m	Ryan Whiting; USA | 20.56 m	Dan Taylor; USA | 20.28 m	Pavel Lyzhyn; BLR | DQ
Men's Javelin Throw	Tero Pitkämäki; FIN | 84.41 m	Andreas Thorkildsen; NOR | 83.63 m	Matthias de Zordo; GER | 82.05 m	Ainars Kovals; LAT | 81.18 m	Teemu Wirkkala; FIN | 79.90 m	Jarrod Bannister; AUS | 77.89 m	Oleksandr Pyatnytsya; UKR | 77.53 m	Ari Mannio; FIN | 76.68 m
Women's 200m (−0.2 m/s)	Allyson Felix; USA | 22.41	Shalonda Solomon; USA | 22.51	Bianca Knight; USA | 22.59	Aleksandra Fedoriva-Spayer; RUS | 22.79	Yuliya Chermoshanskaya; RUS | DQ	Debbie Ferguson-McKenzie; BAH | 22.97	Consuella Moore; USA | 23.32	Monica Hargrove; USA | 23.66
Women's 400m	Tatyana Firova; RUS | DQ	Debbie Dunn; USA | 50.59	Francena McCorory; USA | 50.66	Shericka Williams; JAM | 50.71	Amantle Montsho; BOT | 50.74	Novlene Williams-Mills; JAM | 51.18	Antonina Krivoshapka; RUS | 51.19	Natalya Nazarova; RUS | 52.97
Women's 1500m	Nancy Jebet Langat; KEN | 4:00.70	Anna Alminova; RUS | DQ	Mimi Belete; BRN | 4:01.64	Abeba Aregawi; ETH | 4:01.98	Morgan Uceny; USA | 4:02.72	Gelete Burka; ETH | 4:02.84	Shannon Rowbury; USA | 4:02.95	Maryam Yusuf Jamal; BRN | 4:03.29
Women's 100mH (+0.2 m/s)	Sally Pearson; AUS | 12.57	Priscilla Schliep; CAN | 12.59	Lolo Jones; USA | 12.70	Queen Claye; USA | 12.78	Perdita Felicien; CAN | 12.79	Danielle Carruthers; USA | 12.96	Vonette Dixon; JAM | 12.98	Yevheniya Snihur; UKR | 13.05
Women's 3000mSC	Yuliya Zaripova; RUS | 9:17.59	Milcah Chemos; KEN | 9:19.32	Lydia Chebet Rotich; KEN | 9:21.25	Sofia Assefa; ETH | 9:22.09	Gladys Jerotich Kipkemoi; KEN | 9:24.96	Mercy Wanjiku Njoroge; KEN | 9:26.64	Katarzyna Kowalska; POL | 9:37.00	Lisa Aguilera; USA | 9:37.98
Women's High Jump	Blanka Vlašić; CRO | 2.02 m	Chaunte Lowe; USA | 2.00 m	Emma Green; SWE | 1.94 m	Svetlana Shkolina; RUS | 1.94 m	Irina Gordeyeva; RUS | 1.90 m	Ebba Jungmark; SWE | 1.90 m	Stine Kufaas; NOR | 1.90 m	Airinė Palšytė; LTU | 1.85 m
Women's Pole Vault	Svetlana Feofanova; RUS | 4.71 m	Silke Spiegelburg; GER | 4.61 m	Fabiana Murer; BRA | 4.51 m	Kristina Gadschiew; GER | 4.51 m	Yuliya Golubchikova; RUS | 4.51 m	Aleksandra Kiryashova; RUS | 4.41 m	Kate Dennison; GBR | 4.41 m	Jiřina Ptáčníková; CZE | 4.41 m
Women's Long Jump	Darya Klishina; RUS | 6.78 m	Brittney Reese; USA | 6.75 m	Naide Gomes; POR | 6.72 m	Lyudmila Kolchanova; RUS | 6.70 m	Ineta Radēviča; LAT | 6.70 m	Funmi Jimoh; USA | 6.61 m	Carolina Klüft; SWE | 6.57 m	Olga Kucherenko; RUS | 6.46 m

London
Event	1st +4 pts	2nd +2 pts	3rd +1 pts	4th ⠀	5th ⠀	6th ⠀	7th ⠀	8th ⠀
Men's 100m (−0.4 m/s)	Tyson Gay; USA | 9.78	Yohan Blake; JAM | 9.89	Richard Thompson; TTO | 10.05	J-Mee Samuels; USA | 10.10	Michael Rodgers; USA | 10.17	Trell Kimmons; USA | 10.27	Wallace Spearmon; USA | 10.29	Walter Dix; USA | 12.46
Men's 400m	Jeremy Wariner; USA | 44.67	Jermaine Gonzales; JAM | 44.80	Ricardo Chambers; JAM | 45.18	Michael Bingham; GBR | 45.49	David Gillick; IRL | 45.79	Martyn Rooney; GBR | 45.89	Kévin Borlée; BEL | 46.03	Jamaal Torrance; USA | 47.38
Men's Mile	Augustine Kiprono Choge; KEN | 3:50.14	Mekonnen Gebremedhin; ETH | 3:50.35	Leonel Manzano; USA | 3:50.64	Amine Laalou; MAR | 3:51.51	Ryan Gregson; AUS | 3:52.24	Silas Kiplagat; KEN | 3:52.32	Gideon Gathimba; KEN | 3:52.81	Mohamed Moustaoui; MAR | 3:53.06
Men's 110mH (−0.4 m/s)	David Oliver; USA | 13.06	Dwight Thomas; JAM | 13.32	Garfield Darien; FRA | 13.34	William Sharman; GBR | 13.39	Joel Brown; USA | 13.41	Ryan Wilson; USA | 13.46	Tyron Akins; USA | 13.48	Andrew Turner; GBR | 13.54
Men's 400mH	Bershawn Jackson; USA | 48.12	Javier Culson; PUR | 48.17	David Greene; GBR | 49.09	Justin Gaymon; USA | 49.10	Rhys Williams; GBR | 49.85	Jehue Gordon; TTO | 50.07	Félix Sánchez; DOM | 50.22	LJ van Zyl; RSA | 50.64
Men's 3000mSC	Paul Kipsiele Koech; KEN | 8:17.70	Ezekiel Kemboi; KEN | 8:19.95	Brimin Kiprop Kipruto; KEN | 8:20.77	Linus Kipwambok Chumba; KEN | 8:30.59	Antonio David Jiménez; ESP | 8:30.90	Youcef Abdi; AUS | 8:31.87	Ben Bruce; USA | 8:32.14	Luke Gunn; GBR | 8:32.65
Men's High Jump	Ivan Ukhov; RUS | 2.29 m	Jesse Williams; USA | 2.27 m	Donald Thomas; BAH | 2.27 m	Aleksandr Shustov; RUS | 2.27 m	Samson Oni; GBR | 2.24 m	Robbie Grabarz; GBR | 2.24 m	Jaroslav Bába; CZE | 2.20 m	Dusty Jonas; USA | NH m
Men's Pole Vault	Łukasz Michalski; POL | 5.71 m	Derek Miles; USA | 5.61 m	Przemysław Czerwiński; POL | 5.51 m	Brad Walker; USA | 5.51 m	Romain Mesnil; FRA | 5.31 m	Steven Lewis; GBR | 5.31 m	Maksym Mazuryk; UKR | NH m	Giuseppe Gibilisco; ITA | NH m
Men's Long Jump	Dwight Phillips; USA | 8.18 m	Morten Jensen; DEN | 7.96 m	Chris Tomlinson; GBR | 7.92 m	Pavel Shalin; RUS | 7.89 m	Michel Tornéus; SWE | 7.85 m	Fabrice Lapierre; AUS | 7.81 m	Tyrone Smith; BER | 7.70 m	Chris Noffke; AUS | 7.66 m
Men's Triple Jump	Christian Olsson; SWE | 17.41 m	Teddy Tamgho; FRA | 17.27 m	Alexis Copello; CUB | 17.02 m	Yanxi Li; CHN | 16.67 m	Leevan Sands; BAH | 16.57 m	Phillips Idowu; GBR | 16.54 m	Dmitrij Vaľukevič; SVK | 16.37 m	Nathan Douglas; GBR | 16.00 m
Men's Shot Put	Reese Hoffa; USA | 21.44 m	Tomasz Majewski; POL | 21.20 m	Christian Cantwell; USA | 20.78 m	Dan Taylor; USA | 20.68 m	Adam Nelson; USA | 20.39 m	Dylan Armstrong; CAN | 19.91 m	Cory Martin; USA | 19.82 m	Ryan Whiting; USA | 19.78 m
Men's Discus Throw	Gerd Kanter; EST | 67.82 m	Zoltán Kővágó; HUN | 65.54 m	Virgilijus Alekna; LTU | 65.33 m	Casey Malone; USA | 65.16 m	Piotr Małachowski; POL | 65.10 m	Brett Morse; GBR | 63.35 m	Märt Israel; EST | 62.97 m	Gerhard Mayer; AUT | 62.77 m
Men's Javelin Throw	Andreas Thorkildsen; NOR | 87.38 m	Matthias de Zordo; GER | 86.97 m	Tero Pitkämäki; FIN | 84.71 m	Teemu Wirkkala; FIN | 82.24 m	Ainars Kovals; LAT | 80.96 m	Ari Mannio; FIN | 79.77 m	Harri Haatainen; FIN | 77.07 m	James Campbell; GBR | 75.83 m
Women's 200m (+0.5 m/s)	Allyson Felix; USA | 22.37	Debbie Ferguson-McKenzie; BAH | 22.88	Sherone Simpson; JAM | 23.04	Cydonie Mothersill; CAY | 23.27	Kerron Stewart; JAM | 23.28	Yelizaveta Bryzgina; UKR | 23.37	Abiodun Oyepitan; GBR | 23.39	Bianca Knight; USA | DQ
Women's 400m	Allyson Felix; USA | 50.79	Tatyana Firova; RUS | DQ	Debbie Dunn; USA | 50.89	Amantle Montsho; BOT | 50.96	Shericka Williams; JAM | 51.10	Novlene Williams-Mills; JAM | 51.22	Perri Shakes-Drayton; GBR | 51.48	Vicki Barr; GBR | 53.82
Women's 800m	Mariya Savinova; RUS | DQ	Janeth Jepkosgei; KEN | 1:59.16	Jemma Simpson; GBR | 1:59.26	Morgan Uceny; USA | 1:59.32	Jennifer Meadows; GBR | 1:59.40	Anna Willard; USA | 1:59.64	Lisa Dobriskey; GBR | 2:00.14	Alysia Montaño; USA | 2:00.51
Women's 1500m	Nancy Jebet Langat; KEN | 4:07.60	Anna Alminova; RUS | DQ	Lisa Dobriskey; GBR | 4:09.07	Erin Donohue; USA | 4:09.72	Shannon Rowbury; USA | 4:09.93	Anna Mishchenko; UKR | 4:10.61	Ingvill Måkestad Bovim; NOR | 4:10.95	Genzebe Dibaba; ETH | 4:11.34
Women's 5000m	Tirunesh Dibaba; ETH | 14:36.41	Vivian Jepkemei Cheruiyot; KEN | 14:38.17	Sentayehu Ejigu; ETH | 14:39.24	Sally Kipyego; KEN | 14:41.94	Linet Chepkwemoi Masai; KEN | 14:42.37	Pauline Chemning Korikwiang; KEN | 14:46.80	Emebet Anteneh; ETH | 14:52.54	Mercy Cherono; KEN | 14:53.61
Women's 100mH (+0.2 m/s)	Priscilla Schliep; CAN | 12.52	Sally Pearson; AUS | 12.61	Lolo Jones; USA | 12.66	Queen Claye; USA | 12.69	Danielle Carruthers; USA | 12.82	Ginnie Crawford; USA | 12.85	Perdita Felicien; CAN | 12.96	Christina Vukicevic; NOR | 13.02
Women's 400mH	Kaliese Carter; JAM | 53.78	Zuzana Hejnová; CZE | 55.11	Eilidh Doyle; GBR | 55.16	Nicole Leach; USA | 55.78	Sheena Johnson-Tosta; USA | 55.89	Natalya Antyukh; RUS | 55.89	Nickiesha Wilson; JAM | 56.80	Dominique Darden; USA | 57.94
Women's 3000mSC	Milcah Chemos; KEN | 9:22.49	Yuliya Zaripova; RUS | 9:22.60	Lydia Chebet Rotich; KEN | 9:23.68	Sofia Assefa; ETH | 9:24.33	Mercy Wanjiku Njoroge; KEN | 9:27.84	Birtukan Adamu; ETH | 9:31.39	Lisa Aguilera; USA | 9:31.93	Katarzyna Kowalska; POL | 9:35.60
Women's High Jump	Blanka Vlašić; CRO | 2.01 m	Ruth Beitia; ESP | 1.91 m	Irina Gordeyeva; RUS | 1.91 m	Svetlana Shkolina; RUS | 1.88 m	Levern Spencer; LCA | 1.88 m	Chaunte Lowe; USA | 1.85 m	Stephanie Pywell; GBR | 1.85 m	Nicole Forrester; CAN | NH m
Women's Long Jump	Darya Klishina; RUS | 6.65 m	Lyudmila Kolchanova; RUS | 6.65 m	Hyleas Fountain; USA | 6.57 m	Ineta Radēviča; LAT | 6.56 m	Funmi Jimoh; USA | 6.49 m	Naide Gomes; POR | 6.45 m	Jade Johnson; GBR | 5.92 m	Tianna Madison; USA | 5.32 m
Women's Triple Jump	Yargelis Savigne; CUB | 14.86 m	Olga Rypakova; KAZ | 14.74 m	Olha Saladukha; UKR | 14.40 m	Snežana Vukmirovič; SLO | 14.25 m	Simona la Mantia; ITA | 14.24 m	Limei Xie; CHN | 14.04 m	Anna Pyatykh; RUS | 13.97 m	Laura Samuel; GBR | 12.71 m
Women's Shot Put	Nadezhda Ostapchuk; BLR | DQ	Valerie Adams; NZL | 19.83 m	Lijiao Gong; CHN | 19.26 m	Cleopatra Borel; TTO | 19.03 m	Natalya Mikhnevich; BLR | DQ	Jillian Camarena-Williams; USA | 18.91 m	Michelle Carter; USA | 18.13 m	Rebecca Peake; GBR | 15.48 m
Women's Discus Throw	Yarelis Barrios; CUB | 65.62 m	Sandra Perković; CRO | 63.30 m	Nicoleta Grasu; ROU | 61.78 m	Becky Breisch; USA | 61.03 m	Nadine Müller; GER | 59.09 m	Aretha D. Thurmond; USA | 58.38 m	Joanna Wiśniewska; POL | 57.77 m	Jade Lally; GBR | 54.31 m
Women's Javelin Throw	Barbora Špotáková; CZE | 63.50 m	Kara Winger; USA | 63.41 m	Linda Stahl; GER | 59.60 m	Christina Obergföll; GER | 58.45 m	Madara Palameika; LAT | 58.31 m	Ásdís Hjálmsdóttir; ISL | 54.92 m	Laura Whittingham; GBR | 53.94 m	Rachel Buciarski; USA | 51.69 m

Zurich
Event	1st +8 pts	2nd +4 pts	3rd +2 pts	4th ⠀	5th ⠀	6th ⠀	7th ⠀	8th ⠀
Men's 200m (+0.4 m/s)	Wallace Spearmon; USA | 19.79	Yohan Blake; JAM | 19.86	Ryan Bailey; USA | 20.10	Steve Mullings; JAM | 20.11	Jaysuma Saidy Ndure; NOR | 20.29	Xavier Carter; USA | 20.38	Churandy Martina; AHO | 20.40	Marc Schneeberger; SUI | 20.55
Men's 400m	Jeremy Wariner; USA | 44.13	Jermaine Gonzales; JAM | 44.51	Angelo Taylor; USA | 44.72	Ricardo Chambers; JAM | 44.96	Jonathan Borlée; BEL | 45.23	Martyn Rooney; GBR | 45.67	Michael Bingham; GBR | 46.00	David Gillick; IRL | 46.05
Men's 5000m	Tariku Bekele; ETH | 12:55.03	Imane Merga; ETH | 12:56.34	Chris Solinsky; USA | 12:56.45	Vincent Kiprop Chepkok; KEN | 12:57.77	Mo Farah; GBR | 12:57.94	Edwin Cheruiyot Soi; KEN | 12:58.91	Moses Ndiema Masai; KEN | 13:02.45	Vincent Kipsegechi Yator; KEN | 13:04.50
Men's 110mH (−0.3 m/s)	David Oliver; USA | 12.93	Dwight Thomas; JAM | 13.25	Ryan Wilson; USA | 13.26	Petr Svoboda; CZE | 13.30	Joel Brown; USA | 13.31	Garfield Darien; FRA | 13.34	Jason Richardson; USA | 13.34	Andrew Turner; GBR | 13.36
Men's 3000mSC	Ezekiel Kemboi; KEN | 8:01.74	Paul Kipsiele Koech; KEN | 8:05.48	Bouabdellah Tahri; FRA | 8:07.20	Benjamin Kiplagat; UGA | 8:08.70	Richard Kipkemboi Mateelong; KEN | 8:09.25	Saif Saaeed Shaheen; QAT | 8:09.63	Brimin Kiprop Kipruto; KEN | 8:10.02	Mahiedine Mekhissi; FRA | 8:10.50
Men's High Jump	Ivan Ukhov; RUS | 2.29 m	Jesse Williams; USA | 2.26 m	Aleksandr Shustov; RUS | 2.26 m	Aleksey Dmitrik; RUS | 2.26 m	Yaroslav Rybakov; RUS | 2.26 m	Donald Thomas; BAH | 2.26 m	Oleksandr Nartov; UKR | 2.23 m	Martyn Bernard; GBR | 2.20 m
Men's Long Jump	Dwight Phillips; USA | 8.20 m	Christian Reif; GER | 8.11 m	Chris Tomlinson; GBR | 7.97 m	Pavel Shalin; RUS | 7.88 m	Andrew Howe; ITA | 7.88 m	Salim Sdiri; FRA | 7.84 m	Kafétien Gomis; FRA | 7.29 m	Fabrice Lapierre; AUS | NM
Men's Discus Throw	Robert Harting; GER | 68.64 m	Piotr Małachowski; POL | 68.48 m	Mario Pestano; ESP | 66.49 m	Zoltán Kővágó; HUN | 65.32 m	Gerd Kanter; EST | 65.20 m	Casey Malone; USA | 64.49 m	Virgilijus Alekna; LTU | 64.39 m	Jason Young; USA | 62.87 m
Women's 100m (±0.0 m/s)	Veronica Campbell-Brown; JAM | 10.89	Carmelita Jeter; USA | 10.89	Marshevet Hooker; USA | 10.97	Kelly-Ann Baptiste; TTO | 11.11	Sherone Simpson; JAM | 11.18	Blessing Okagbare; NGR | 11.19	Verena Sailer; GER | 11.25	Ezinne Okparaebo; NOR | 11.45
Women's 400m	Allyson Felix; USA | 50.37	Debbie Dunn; USA | 50.57	Amantle Montsho; BOT | 50.63	Shericka Williams; JAM | 50.73	Novlene Williams-Mills; JAM | 50.80	Tatyana Firova; RUS | DQ	Libania Grenot; ITA | 51.07	Kseniya Aksyonova; RUS | 52.07
Women's 1500m	Nancy Jebet Langat; KEN | 4:01.01	Gelete Burka; ETH | 4:02.26	Stephanie Twell; GBR | 4:02.54	Lisa Dobriskey; GBR | 4:02.92	Irene Jelagat; KEN | 4:03.76	Janeth Jepkosgei; KEN | 4:04.17	Abeba Aregawi; ETH | 4:05.05	Shannon Rowbury; USA | 4:05.48
Women's 400mH	Kaliese Carter; JAM | 53.33	Zuzana Hejnová; CZE | 54.54	Ajoke Odumosu; NGR | 55.11	Natalya Antyukh; RUS | 55.14	Eilidh Doyle; GBR | 55.57	Angela Moroşanu; ROU | 56.43	Queen Claye; USA | 56.68	Yevgeniya Isakova; RUS | 59.87
Women's Pole Vault	Fabiana Murer; BRA | 4.81 m	Svetlana Feofanova; RUS | 4.71 m	Silke Spiegelburg; GER | 4.61 m	Lacy Janson; USA | 4.51 m	Lisa Ryzih; GER | 4.51 m	Carolin Hingst; GER | 4.41 m	Yuliya Golubchikova; RUS | 4.41 m	Jiřina Ptáčníková; CZE | 4.41 m
Women's Long Jump	Brittney Reese; USA | 6.89 m	Lyudmila Kolchanova; RUS | 6.73 m	Irene Pusterla; SUI | 6.70 m	Naide Gomes; POR | 6.67 m	Ineta Radēviča; LAT | 6.57 m	Darya Klishina; RUS | 6.54 m	Hyleas Fountain; USA | 6.50 m	Brianna Glenn; USA | 6.45 m
Women's Shot Put indoor	Nadezhda Ostapchuk; BLR | DQ	Valerie Adams; NZL | 20.02 m	Jillian Camarena-Williams; USA | 19.50 m	Natalya Mikhnevich; BLR | 19.24 m	Cleopatra Borel; TTO | 19.09 m	Misleydis González; CUB | 18.83 m	Nadine Kleinert; GER | 18.55 m	Michelle Carter; USA | 18.20 m
Women's Javelin Throw	Christina Obergföll; GER | 67.31 m	Barbora Špotáková; CZE | 65.34 m	Linda Stahl; GER | 63.30 m	Mariya Abakumova; RUS | DQ	Katharina Molitor; GER | 62.21 m	Madara Palameika; LAT | 61.75 m	Sunette Viljoen; RSA | 59.95 m	Vera Markaryan; UKR | 59.78 m

Brussels
Event	1st +8 pts	2nd +4 pts	3rd +2 pts	4th ⠀	5th ⠀	6th ⠀	7th ⠀	8th ⠀
Men's 100m (+0.1 m/s)	Tyson Gay; USA | 9.79	Nesta Carter; JAM | 9.85	Yohan Blake; JAM | 9.91	Daniel Bailey; ANT | 10.09	Richard Thompson; TTO | 10.11	Mario Forsythe; JAM | 10.12	Trell Kimmons; USA | 10.20	Dexter Lee; JAM | 10.21
Men's 800m	David Rudisha; KEN | 1:43.50	Abubaker Kaki; SUD | 1:43.84	Boaz Kiplagat Lalang; KEN | 1:44.29	Marcin Lewandowski; POL | 1:44.97	Jackson Mumbwa Kivuva; KEN | 1:45.62	David Mutinda Mutua; KEN | 1:45.90	Antonio Manuel Reina; ESP | 1:45.97	Duane Solomon; USA | 1:46.17
Men's 1500m	Asbel Kiprop; KEN | 3:32.18	Leonel Manzano; USA | 3:32.37	Augustine Kiprono Choge; KEN | 3:32.88	Mekonnen Gebremedhin; ETH | 3:33.40	Thomas Lancashire; GBR | 3:33.96	Daniel Kipchirchir Komen; KEN | 3:34.03	Carsten Schlangen; GER | 3:34.19	Collis Birmingham; AUS | 3:35.50
Men's 400mH	Bershawn Jackson; USA | 47.85	David Greene; GBR | 48.26	Javier Culson; PUR | 48.71	Justin Gaymon; USA | 49.30	Michael Bultheel; BEL | 49.38	Angelo Taylor; USA | 49.72	Jehue Gordon; TTO | 49.80	Sébastien Maillard; FRA | 50.75
Men's Pole Vault	Malte Mohr; GER | 5.85 m	Renaud Lavillenie; FRA | 5.80 m	Maksym Mazuryk; UKR | 5.75 m	Fabian Schulze; GER | 5.65 m	Derek Miles; USA | 5.65 m	Steven Hooker; AUS | 5.65 m	Giuseppe Gibilisco; ITA | 5.55 m	Łukasz Michalski; POL | 5.55 m
Men's Triple Jump	Teddy Tamgho; FRA | 17.52 m	Alexis Copello; CUB | 17.47 m	Christian Olsson; SWE | 17.35 m	David Girat; CUB | 17.10 m	Benjamin Compaoré; FRA | 16.96 m	Nathan Douglas; GBR | 16.86 m	Marian Oprea; ROU | 16.83 m	Randy Lewis; GRN | 16.11 m
Men's Shot Put	Reese Hoffa; USA | 22.16 m	Christian Cantwell; USA | 21.62 m	Tomasz Majewski; POL | 21.44 m	Dylan Armstrong; CAN | 20.87 m	Adam Nelson; USA | 20.26 m	Cory Martin; USA | 20.24 m	Dorian Scott; JAM | 19.20 m	Wim Blondeel; BEL | 18.15 m
Men's Javelin Throw	Andreas Thorkildsen; NOR | 89.88 m	Tero Pitkämäki; FIN | 83.36 m	Matthias de Zordo; GER | 82.39 m	Jarrod Bannister; AUS | 82.05 m	Teemu Wirkkala; FIN | 82.01 m	Ainars Kovals; LAT | 81.45 m	Ari Mannio; FIN | 80.66 m	Petr Frydrych; CZE | 77.29 m
Women's 200m (+0.4 m/s)	Allyson Felix; USA | 22.61	Shalonda Solomon; USA | 22.70	Bianca Knight; USA | 23.01	Aleksandra Fedoriva-Spayer; RUS | 23.07	Kelly-Ann Baptiste; TTO | 23.26	Yelizaveta Bryzgina; UKR | 23.28	Porscha Lucas; USA | 23.36	Olivia Borlée; BEL | 23.61
Women's 800m	Janeth Jepkosgei; KEN | 1:58.82	Mariya Savinova; RUS | DQ	Caster Semenya; RSA | 1:59.65	Alysia Montaño; USA | 1:59.89	Jennifer Meadows; GBR | 1:59.93	Anna Willard; USA | 2:00.05	Elisa Cusma; ITA | 2:00.35	Tintu Luka; IND | 2:00.79
Women's 5000m	Vivian Jepkemei Cheruiyot; KEN | 14:34.13	Linet Chepkwemoi Masai; KEN | 14:35.07	Sentayehu Ejigu; ETH | 14:35.13	Sally Kipyego; KEN | 14:38.64	Elvan Abeylegesse; TUR | 14:39.61	Sylvia Jebiwot Kibet; KEN | 14:39.80	Ines Chenonge; KEN | 14:43.14	Meselech Melkamu; ETH | 14:44.26
Women's 100mH (±0.0 m/s)	Priscilla Schliep; CAN | 12.54	Sally Pearson; AUS | 12.64	Perdita Felicien; CAN | 12.68	Queen Claye; USA | 12.69	Lolo Jones; USA | 12.78	Danielle Carruthers; USA | 12.93	Derval O'Rourke; IRL | 12.96	Christina Vukicevic; NOR | 13.21
Women's 3000mSC	Sofia Assefa; ETH | 9:20.72	Milcah Chemos; KEN | 9:22.34	Almaz Ayana; ETH | 9:22.51	Mekdes Bekele; ETH | 9:24.17	Lisa Aguilera; USA | 9:24.84	Lydia Chebet Rotich; KEN | 9:29.24	Katarzyna Kowalska; POL | 9:33.79	Birtukan Adamu; ETH | 9:45.06
Women's High Jump	Blanka Vlašić; CRO | 2.00 m	Antonietta di Martino; ITA | 1.98 m	Emma Green; SWE | 1.98 m	Ruth Beitia; ESP | 1.92 m	Svetlana Shkolina; RUS | 1.92 m	Irina Gordeyeva; RUS | 1.86 m	Levern Spencer; LCA | 1.86 m	Ana Šimić; CRO | 1.80 m
Women's Triple Jump	Olga Rypakova; KAZ | 14.80 m	Yargelis Savigne; CUB | 14.56 m	Olha Saladukha; UKR | 14.38 m	Dana Velďáková; SVK | 14.19 m	Snežana Vukmirovič; SLO | 14.16 m	Svetlana Bolshakova; BEL | 14.04 m	Nadezhda Alyokhina; RUS | 13.74 m	Anna Pyatykh; RUS | 13.73 m
Women's Discus Throw	Sandra Perković; CRO | 66.93 m	Yarelis Barrios; CUB | 65.96 m	Yanfeng Li; CHN | 64.74 m	Dani Stevens; AUS | 62.13 m	Nicoleta Grasu; ROU | 61.68 m	Aretha D. Thurmond; USA | 61.58 m	Becky Breisch; USA | 59.77 m	Joanna Wiśniewska; POL | 58.42 m
