= 2009 USA Outdoor Track and Field Championships =

- Host city: Eugene, Oregon, United States
- Venue: Hayward Field
- Events: 36

The 2009 USA Outdoor Track and Field Championships took place between June 25–28 at Hayward Field in Eugene, Oregon. The competition acted as a way of selecting the United States team for the 2009 World Championships in Athletics in Berlin later that year.

== Results ==
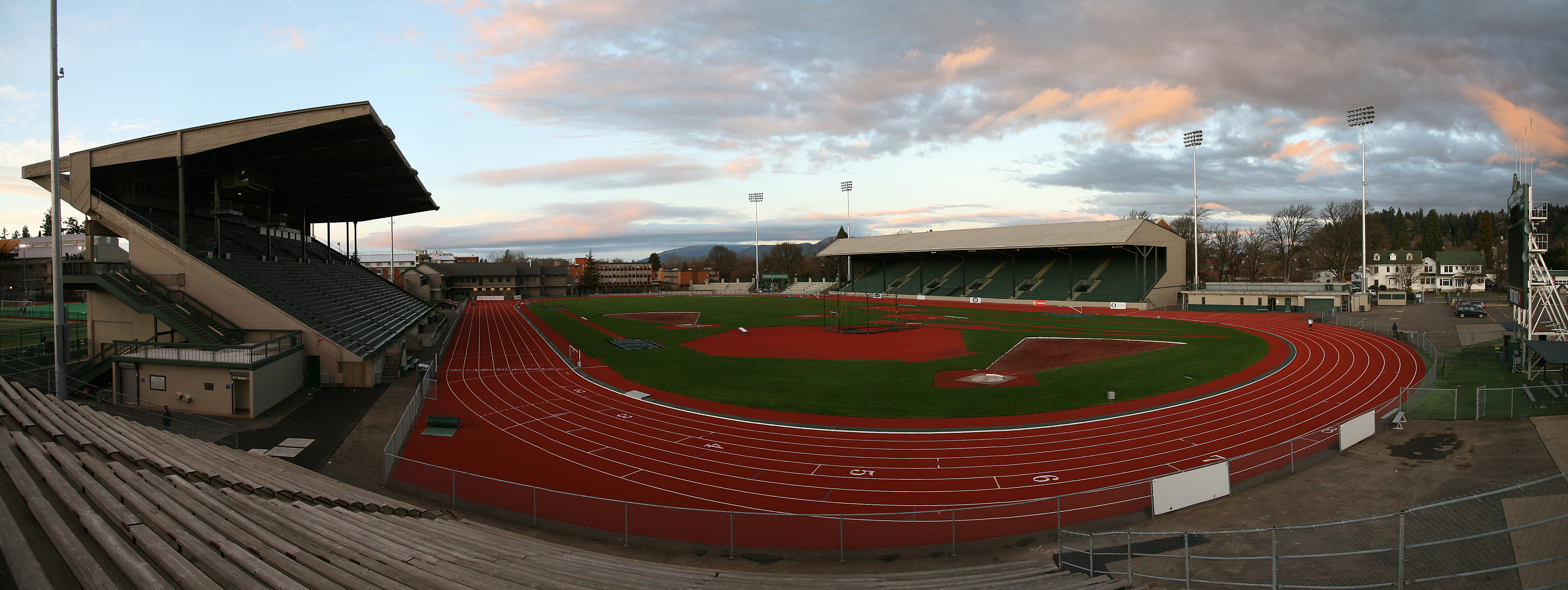
Hayward Field hosted the 2009 competition

=== Men track events ===
| Event | Gold | | Silver | | Bronze | |
|---|---|---|---|---|---|---|
| 100 m Wind : +3.1 m/s | Michael Rodgers | 9.91 | Darvis Patton | 9.92 | Monzavous Edwards | 10.00 |
| 200 m Wind : +3.3 m/s | Shawn Crawford | 19.73 | Charles Clark | 20.00 | Wallace Spearmon | 20.03 |
| 400 m | LaShawn Merritt | 44.50 | Gil Roberts | 44.93 | Kerron Clement | 45.14 |
| 800 m | Nick Symmonds | 1:45.86 | Khadevis Robinson | 1:45.97 | Ryan Brown | 1:46.67 |
| 1500 m | Lopez Lomong | 3:41.68 | Leonel Manzano | 3:41.82 | Dorian Ulrey | 3:42.84 |
| 5000 m | Matt Tegenkamp | 13:20.57 | Chris Solinsky | 13:20.82 | Evan Jager | 13:22.18 |
| 10,000 m | Galen Rupp | 27:52.53 | Dathan Ritzenhein | 27:58.59 | Tim Nelson | 28:01.34 |
| 3000 m steeplechase | Joshua McAdams | 8:29.91 | Daniel Huling | 8:32.86 | Kyle Alcorn | 8:34.65 |
| 20 km walk | Timothy Seaman | 1:26:14.26 | Patrick Stroupe | 1:26:41.44 | Benjamin Shorey | 1:27:17.59 |
| 110 m hurdles Wind : +1.7 m/s | David Payne | 13.12 | Terrence Trammell | 13.12 | Aries Merritt | 13.15 |
| 400 m hurdles | Bershawn Jackson | 48.03 | Johnny Dutch | 48.18 | Angelo Taylor | 48.30 |

=== Men field events ===
| Event | Gold | | Silver | | Bronze | |
|---|---|---|---|---|---|---|
| High jump | Tora Harris | 2.31 m | Andra Manson | 2.28 m | — | — |
| High jump | Tora Harris | 2.31 m | Keith Moffatt | 2.28 m | — | — |
| Pole vault | Brad Walker | 5.75 m | Jeremy Scott | 5.75 m | — | — |
| Pole vault | Brad Walker | 5.75 m | Derek Miles | 5.75 m | — | — |
| Long jump | Dwight Phillips | 8.57 m | Brian Johnson | 8.26 m | George Kitchens | 8.23 m |
| Triple jump | Brandon Roulhac | 17.44 m (w) | Walter Davis | 16.84 m | James Jenkins | 16.79 m (w) |
| Shot put | Christian Cantwell | 21.82 m | Dan Taylor | 21.21 m | Reese Hoffa | 21.10 m |
| Discus throw | Casey Malone | 64.99 m | Jarred Rome | 63.48 m | Ian Waltz | 61.91 m |
| Hammer throw | A. G. Kruger | 75.31 m | Jake Freeman | 74.64 m | Michael Mai | 73.80 m |
| Javelin throw | Chris Hill | 83.87 m | Mike Hazle | 82.06 m | Sean Furey | 76.16 m |
| Decathlon | Trey Hardee | 8261 pts | Ashton Eaton | 8075 pts | Jake Arnold | 7984 pts |

=== Women track events ===
| Event | Gold | | Silver | | Bronze | |
|---|---|---|---|---|---|---|
| 100 m Wind : +3.3 m/s | Carmelita Jeter | 10.78 | Muna Lee | 10.78 | Lauryn Williams | 10.96 |
| 200 m Wind : +3.2 m/s | Allyson Felix | 22.02 | Muna Lee | 22.13 | Marshevet Hooker | 22.36 |
| 400 m | Sanya Richards | 50.05 | Debbie Dunn | 50.79 | Jessica Beard | 50.81 |
| 800 m | Hazel Clark | 2:00.79 | Geena Gall | 2:01.01 | Phoebe Wright | 2:01.12 |
| 1500 m | Shannon Rowbury | 4:05.07 | Christin Wurth-Thomas | 4:06.00 | Anna Willard | 4:07.70 |
| 5000 m | Kara Goucher | 15:20.94 | Jennifer Rhines | 15:26.92 | Angela Bizzarri | 15:33.02 |
| 10,000 m | Amy Begley | 31:22.69 | Shalane Flanagan | 31:23.43 | Katie McGregor | 32:08.04 |
| 3000 m steeplechase | Jennifer Barringer | 9:29.38 | Anna Willard | 9:35.01 | Bridget Franek | 9:36.74 |
| 20 km walk | Teresa Vaill | 1:37:12.84 | Joanne Dow | 1:39:59.32 | Maria Michta | 1:41:16.24 |
| 100 m hurdles Wind : +2.2 m/s | Dawn Harper | 12.36 | Ginnie Powell | 12.47 | Damu Cherry | 12.58 |
| 400 m hurdles | Lashinda Demus | 53.78 | Sheena Tosta | 54.54 | Tiffany Williams | 55.18 |

=== Women field events ===
| Event | Gold | | Silver | | Bronze | |
|---|---|---|---|---|---|---|
| High jump | Chaunte Howard | 1.95 m | Amy Acuff | 1.95 m | Sharon Day | 1.95 m |
| Pole vault | Jennifer Stuczynski | 4.65 m | Chelsea Johnson | 4.60 m | Stacy Dragila | 4.55 m |
| Long jump | Brittney Reese | 7.09 m (w) | Brianna Glenn | 6.82 m (w) | Funmi Jimoh | 6.77 m |
| Triple jump | Shakeema Welsch | 14.30 m (w) | Erica McLain | 13.91 m (w) | Toni Smith | 13.90 m (w) |
| Shot put | Michelle Carter | 18.03 m | Jillian Camarena | 17.94 m | Kristin Heaston | 17.88 m |
| Discus throw | Stephanie Brown Trafton | 64.25 m | Aretha Thurmond | 62.51 m | Rebecca Breisch | 62.08 m |
| Hammer throw | Jessica Cosby | 72.04 m | Amber Campbell | 68.92 m | Erin Gilreath | 68.08 m |
| Javelin throw | Kara Patterson | 63.95 m | Rachel Yurkovich | 59.31 m | Kim Kreiner | 58.00 m |
| Heptathlon | Diana Pickler | 6290 pts | Sharon Day | 6177 pts | Bettie Wade | 5908 pts |

== See also ==
- United States Olympic Trials (track and field)
