= Chris Noffke =

Australian long jumper

Chris Noffke (born 6 January 1988) is an Australian long jumper.

He was born in Ipswich. He attended St Peter's Lutheran College in Brisbane, Queensland.

He finished fourth at the 2004 World Junior Championships and won the gold medal at the 2005 World Youth Championships. He also competed at the 2006 World Junior Championships and the 2007 World Championships without reaching the final round.

His personal best jump is 8.33 metres, achieved in March 2010 in Perth.
