= Daniel Huling =

American steeplechase runner

Dan Huling
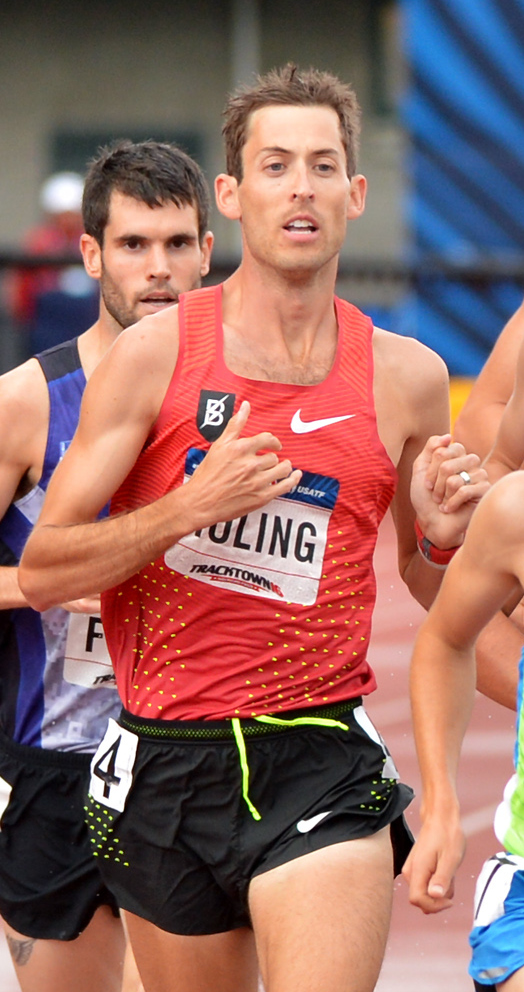
- Huling running steeplechase at the 2016 Olympic Trials

Personal information
- Full name: Daniel Huling
- Born: July 16, 1983 (age 43) Geneva, Illinois, U.S.

Sport
- Sport: Track and field
- Event: 3000 m steeplechase
- College team: Miami RedHawks

Achievements and titles
- Personal best: 8:13.29 min
Medal record
USA Outdoor Championships
Bronze medal – third place	2015	3000 m st.
Silver medal – second place	2014	3000 m st.
Silver medal – second place	2013	3000 m st.
Silver medal – second place	2011	3000 m st.
Gold medal – first place	2010	3000 m st.
Silver medal – second place	2009	3000 m st.

Daniel "Dan" Huling (born July 16, 1983) is an American distance runner who specializes in the 3000-meter steeplechase. He holds a personal record of 8:13.29 minutes for the event, set in 2010. He has represented the United States at the World Championships in Athletics four times (2009 to 2015).

He was the American steeplechase champion at the USA Outdoor Track and Field Championships in 2010. He also ran at the 2010 IAAF Continental Cup. Collegiately, he competed for the Miami RedHawks.

== Career ==
=== Early life ===
Born in North Kingstown, Rhode Island to Kenneth and Laurie Huling. He attended Geneva High School there and after an initial interest in tennis, he ran in state meets in track and field and cross country running. After graduating he enrolled at Miami University in Ohio to study marketing.

=== College ===
Huling competed for the school's Miami RedHawks from 2002 to 2006. He set a series of school records on the indoor track, included the 1500 meters, mile run, 3000 meters and the 5000 meters. His collegiate best of 8:27.41 minutes for the steeplechase was also a school record. In Mid-American Conference competitions he was a three-time champion in the steeplechase and also won conference titles in cross country, the 5000 m and the 10,000 meters. His best placings at NCAA-level were sixth in the 5000 m in 2006 and 26th at the NCAA Men's Division I Cross Country Championship in 2005. He earned All-American honours for those two performances.

=== Professional ===
After finishing his studies, he turned professional and began working with coach and former steeplechase athlete Robert Gary. Huling elevated himself near the top of the national scene with a third-place finish in the steeplechase at the 2006 USA Outdoor Track and Field Championships, recording a best of 8:27.41 minutes, but missed most of the following season due to injury. He slowly returned to form in 2008, ranking 13th in the 3000 m at the USA Indoor Track and Field Championships then fifth at the 2008 United States Olympic Trials. By the end of the season he had fully recovered from the injury and recorded a new personal record of 8:20.84 minutes at the Herculis meeting in Monaco.

Huling placed fifth in the 3000 m at the 2009 USA Indoors and continued to rise in the national rankings with a runner-up finish in the steeplechase at the 2009 USA Outdoor Track and Field Championships behind Joshua McAdams. This earned him a place on the national team for the 2009 World Championships in Athletics, where he competed in the qualifying rounds only. The end of the track saw him set a new best of 8:14.69 minutes at the Memorial Van Damme in Brussels and secure a steeplechase win for his nation at the DécaNation. After a personal best of 13:24.72 to win the 5000 m at the Mt. SAC Relays, he placed fourth at the adidas Grand Prix in New York City – his debut on the new IAAF Diamond League circuit. His first national steeplechase title followed at the 2010 USA Outdoor Track and Field Championships. A new personal best of 8:13.29 minutes came at the Athletissima meeting and he competed internationally twice that year: taking eight at the 2010 IAAF Continental Cup and second at the Decánation.

Huling was runner-up at the 2011 USA Outdoor Track and Field Championships and competed at the 2011 World Championships in Athletics, but was eliminated in qualifying, some twenty seconds off his best. The next year he dropped further down the national placings, coming seventh at the 2012 United States Olympic Trials. He returned to the national runner-up spot at the 2013 USA Outdoor Track and Field Championships, finishing behind Evan Jager, and again competed in the qualifying of the 2013 World Championships in Athletics. The consistency of Huling's times improved in the 2014 season as he dipped under eight minutes and twenty seconds on four occasions – these included another second place at the 2014 USA Outdoor Championships behind Jager and a fourth-place finish at the Memorival Van Damme. He had his third straight national top-three finish at the 2015 USA Outdoor Track and Field Championships, again behind Jager and also Donald Cabral on this occasion.

== Personal records ==
- 3000 meters steeplechase – 8:13.29 (2010)
- 1500 meters – 3:37.53 (2012)
- Mile run – 4:07.26 (2008)
- 3000 meters – 7:44.42 (2013)
- 5000 meters – 13:18.42 (2013)
- 10,000 meters – 30:37.25 (2006)
- Mile run indoors – 3:57.99 min (2017)
- 2000 meters indoors – 5:02.41 (2014)
- 3000 meters indoors – 7:49.93 (2011)
- 5000 meters indoors – 13:49.69 (2017)

== National titles ==
- USA Outdoor Track and Field Championships
  - 3000 m steeplechase: 2010

== International competitions ==
Year	Competition	Venue	Position	Notes
2009	World Championships	Berlin, Germany	32nd	8:46.79
2009	DécaNation	Paris, France	1st	8:47,14
2010	IAAF Continental Cup	Split, Croatia	8th	8:27.59
2011	World Championships	Daegu, South Korea	24th	8:34.70
2013	World Championships	Moscow, Russia	34th	8:37.80
2015	World Championships	Beijing, China	5th	8:14.39
