= Rachel Yurkovich =

American javelin thrower (born 1986)

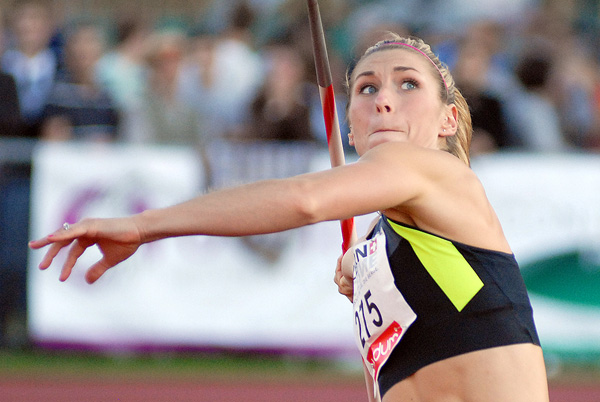
- Rachel Yurkovich 2012 at "Spitzen Leichtathletik Luzern", Lucerne, Switzerland

Personal information
- Nationality: American
- Born: October 10, 1986 (age 39)
- Height: 5 ft 11 in (1.80 m)
- Weight: 135 lb (61 kg)

Sport
- Country: United States
- Sport: Track and field
- Event: Javelin throw
- Coached by: Don Babbitt

Achievements and titles
- Personal best(s): Javelin: 200 ft., 4 in. (61.06 m)

Rachel Yurkovich (born October 10, 1986) is an American javelin thrower. She competed at the 2012 Summer Olympics in London.

Yurkovich graduated from Newberg High School in Newberg, Oregon in 2005. She graduated from the University of Oregon in 2009. She was the NCAA women’s javelin champion in both 2008 and 2009. She placed 11th in the finals of the javelin throw at the 2009 World Championships in Athletics.

Yurkovich placed third at the 2008 U.S. Olympic trials, but failed to qualify for the Games because she had not achieved the Olympic A standard. The situation was reversed in 2012. Yurkovich place fourth in the 2012 U.S. Olympic trials with a distance of 56.85 meters, but qualified because she had previously achieved the Olympic A standard while third-place finisher Kimberley Hamilton had not. Yurkovich had exceeded the A standard by three inches at an April meet in France. At the 2012 Olympics, Yurkovich's best throw during the qualifying round was 57.92 meters. She placed 13th in her group (24th overall) and did not qualify for the final. Yurkovich made an error in her steps on the first throw, committed a foot fault on the second throw, and achieved her best distance on her third throw.

== Personal life ==
Yurkovich is married to a former Danish pole vaulter, Piotr Buciarski, who also competed for the University of Oregon. She and Piotr have two children together, Maya and Maksymilian.
