= Brandon Roulhac =

American triple jumper

Brandon Roulhac (born December 13, 1983, in Marianna, Florida) is an American triple jumper.

He finished sixth at the 2009 World Athletics Final. He also competed at the 2009 World Championships without reaching the final.

His personal best is 17.26 metres, achieved in June 2009 in Eugene.
