= Funmi Jimoh =

American long jumper (born 1984)

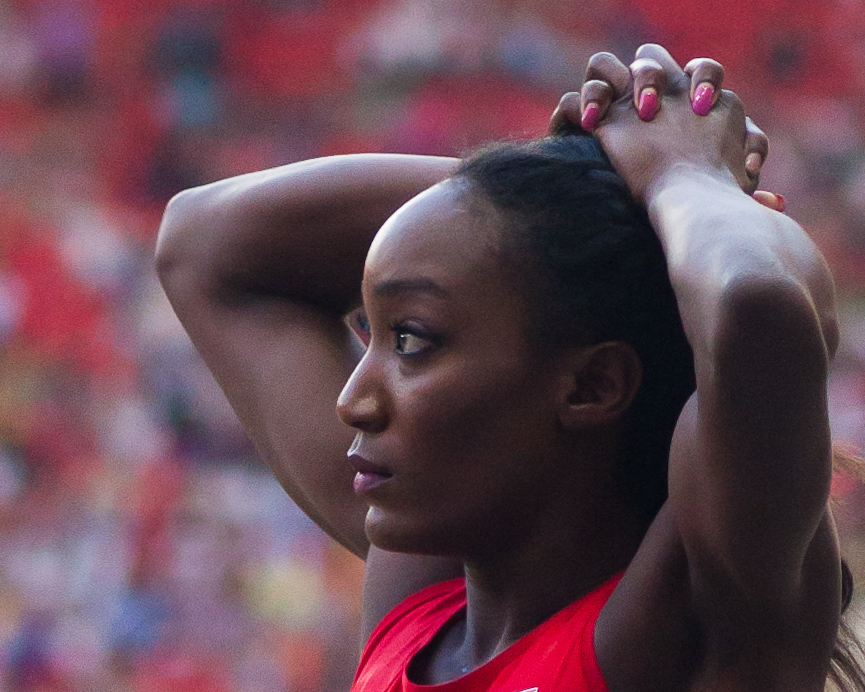
- Jimoh in 2013

Personal information
- Full name: Oluwafunmilayo Kemi Jimoh
- Born: 29 May 1984 (age 42)
- Education: Rice University
- Height: 1.73 m (5 ft 8 in)
- Weight: 59 kg (130 lb)

Sport
- Country: United States

Achievements and titles
- Personal best: Long Jump 6.96 m (2009)

Funmilayo Kemi Jimoh (born May 29, 1984), commonly known as Funmi Jimoh, is an American long jumper, who competed at the 2008 Summer Olympics.

Jimoh competed for Rice University. At Rice, Jimoh competed in both the long jump and sprinting events, such as the 100 meter hurdles. She jumped 22 feet ¾ inch (6.72 meters) in July 2008 in Eugene, Oregon to place third at the U.S. Olympic Trials to qualify for the 2008 Summer Olympics in Beijing.

At the Olympics, Jimoh jumped 6.61 meters in the qualifying round of the women's long jump. That distance tied for ninth in qualifying and earned Jimoh a place in the final. Jimoh placed eleventh in the final, with a jump of 6.29 meters.

During 2009 World Championships in Berlin, Jimoh placed 21st in qualifying with a jump of 6.34 meters and failed to make the final. At the 2011 World Championships, Jimoh placed 12th. She also placed 13th in 2013.

Her personal best is 6.96 meters which she achieved in Doha on 8 May 2009.

== Seasons bests ==
2015	6.72	Roma
2014	6.81	Sacramento, CA
2013	6.92	Doha
2012	6.82	Chula Vista, CA
2011	6.88	Eugene, OR
2011	6.88	Doha
2010	6.81	Walnut, CA
2009	6.96	Doha
2008	6.91	Houston, TX
2007	6.46	Berkeley, CA
2006	6.36	Baton Rouge, LA
2005	6.31	Tulsa, OK
