= Christin Wurth-Thomas =

American middle-distance runner (born 1980)

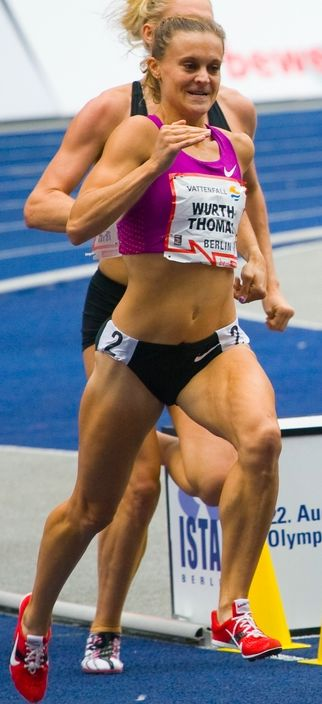
- Wurth-Thomas in 2010

Personal information
- Born: Christin Wurth; July 11, 1980 (age 46) Bloomington, Illinois, U.S.
- Height: 5 ft 5 in (1.65 m)
- Weight: 120 lb (54 kg)

Sport
- Country: United States
- Events: 1500 m, 800 m
- College team: Arkansas Razorbacks
- Coached by: Lance Harter

Achievements and titles
- Olympic finals: 2008, 1500 m
- World finals: 2007, 1500 m 2009, 1500 m, 5th
- Personal best: 1500 m: 3:59.59
Medal record
Continental Cup
Bronze medal – third place	2010 Split	1500 m

Christin Wurth-Thomas (born Christin Wurth on July 11, 1980) is an American athlete who competed in middle distance track events. Wurth-Thomas competed for the United States in the women's 1500 m at the 2008 Summer Olympics.

Wurth-Thomas was born in Bloomington, Illinois. While at the University of Arkansas, Wurth-Thomas was the Southeastern Conference Cross Country and 1500 m champion in 2002. In 2003, she finished 3rd in the 1500 m NCAA outdoor track and field championships.

Wurth-Thomas qualified for the 1500 m at the 2008 Summer Olympics by finishing 3rd at the 2008 U.S. Olympic trials (4:08.48). In Beijing, she finished 8th in the opening round, and did not qualify for the finals.

In 2009, she set a personal best in the 1500 m by running a 3:59:98 at the Golden Gala in Rome, at the time becoming only the 4th American female to break 4:00 at an outdoor 1500 m competition. She also qualified the 2009 World Championships by finishing second at the US Championships to Shannon Rowbury, with a time of 4:06.00. Wurth-Thomas finished 5th at the World Championships, with a time of 4:05.21.

== Personal bests ==
Track	Event	Time (min)	Venue	Date
Outdoor
Outdoor	800 m	1:59.35	Monaco	July 28, 2009
Outdoor	1500 m	3:59.59	Paris	July 16, 2010
Outdoor	One mile	4:39.11	Falmouth, Massachusetts, United States	August 11, 2007
Outdoor	5000 m	15:28.04	Walnut, California, United States	April 18, 2008
Indoor
Indoor	800 m	2:03.70	Boston, Massachusetts, United States	February 25, 2007
Indoor	1500 m	4:10.56	Valencia, Spain	March 8, 2008
Indoor	One mile	4:27.18	Fayetteville, Arkansas, United States	February 15, 2008
Indoor	3000 m	8:43.79	Fayetteville, Arkansas, United States	February 12, 2011
Indoor	5000 m	16:16.79	Fayetteville, Arkansas, United States	February 24, 2003

- All information taken from IAAF profile.
