= 2003 World Championships in Athletics – Men's 1500 metres =

Video on YouTube Official video

These are the official results of the Men's 1500 metres event at the 2003 IAAF World Championships in Paris, France. There were a total number of 29 participating athletes, with three qualifying heats, two semi-finals and the final held on Wednesday 27 August 2003 at 21:00h. The winning margin was 0.54 seconds.

With all eyes on the world record holder Hicham El Guerrouj, the final started with home team favorite Mehdi Baala taking the lead off the line though he was Reyes Estévez uncharacteristically took the lead and began pushing the pace a half lap into the race. As soon as Estévez began to create some daylight, El Guerrouj covered the move through a 57.70 first lap, but after letting Estévez lead a whole lap El Guerrouj edged ahead. It was 1:56.29 (58.59) after 2 laps with Baala the first to follow El Guerrouj, with Paul Korir and Estévez in such close order drill that Korir stumbled from catching Estévez' legs and losing ground. At the bell in 2:37.87, Fouad Chouki joined what was becoming a breakaway by El Guerrouj, Baala and Estévez. 2:51.28 (54.99) after 3 laps and El Guerrouj accelerated. In the final turn, Chouki accelerated past Estévez, but only Baala had managed to stay close to El Guerrouj. Bala was in perfect position to run around El Guerrouj coming off the turn, instead El Guerrouj accelerated again and got enough of a gap that it was clear he was going to win. Coming off the turn Ivan Heshko was in sixth place. He moved out to lane 3 and began sprinting, challenged by Korir. 50 meters from the finish, Chouki began to run out of gas. Estévez passed him but his hold on the bronze medal position was short-lived as Heshko, Korir and Rui Silva all ran past him before the line. A month after the race, Chouki was disqualified and suspended for having Erythropoietin in his system.

== Final ==
RANK	FINAL	TIME
	Hicham El Guerrouj (MAR)	3:31.77
	Mehdi Baala (FRA)	3:32.31
	Ivan Heshko (UKR)	3:33.17
4.	Paul Korir (KEN)	3:33.47
5.	Rui Silva (POR)	3:33.68
6.	Reyes Estévez (ESP)	3:33.84
7.	Gert-Jan Liefers (NED)	3:33.99
8.	Vyacheslav Shabunin (RUS)	3:34.37
9.	Isaac Kiprono Songok (KEN)	3:34.39
10.	Roberto Parra (ESP)	3:35.02
11.	Juan Carlos Higuero (ESP)	3:38.49
—	Fouad Chouki (FRA)	DQ

== Semi-final ==
- Held on Monday 25 August 2003

RANK	HEAT 1	TIME
1.	Hicham El Guerrouj (MAR)	3:38.25
2.	Rui Silva (POR)	3:38.37
3.	Ivan Heshko (UKR)	3:38.43
4.	Roberto Parra (ESP)	3:38.51
5.	Vyacheslav Shabunin (RUS)	3:38.60
6.	Gert-Jan Liefers (NED)	3:38.61
7.	Isaac Kiprono Songok (KEN)	3:39.84
8.	Youcef Abdi (AUS)	3:40.13
9.	Christian Obrist (ITA)	3:41.88
10.	Gareth Turnbull (IRL)	3:42.01
11.	Kevin Sullivan (CAN)	3:42.33
—	Valery Pisarev (KGZ)	DNS

RANK	HEAT 2	TIME
1.	Mehdi Baala (FRA)	3:39.73
2.	Paul Korir (KEN)	3:40.08
3.	Juan Carlos Higuero (ESP)	3:40.29
4.	Reyes Estévez (ESP)	3:40.75
5.	Michael East (GBR)	3:40.87
6.	Hudson de Souza (BRA)	3:41.12
7.	Tarek Boukensa (ALG)	3:41.33
8.	Adrian Blincoe (NZL)	3:41.53
9.	Jason Lunn (USA)	3:41.71
10.	Michal Šneberger (CZE)	3:42.25
11.	Bert Leenaerts (BEL)	3:43.02
—	Fouad Chouki (FRA)	DQ

== Heats ==
Held on Saturday 23 August 2003

RANK	HEAT 1	TIME
1.	Adrian Blincoe (NZL)	3:47.26
2.	Mehdi Baala (FRA)	3:47.26
3.	Reyes Estévez (ESP)	3:47.56
4.	Jason Lunn (USA)	3:47.62
5.	Gert-Jan Liefers (NED)	3:47.81
6.	Tarek Boukensa (ALG)	3:47.88
7.	Youcef Abdi (AUS)	3:48.65
8.	Valery Pisarev (KGZ)	3:50.89
9.	Francis Munthali (MAW)	3:51.61
—	Bernard Lagat (KEN)	DNS

RANK	HEAT 2	TIME
1.	Hicham El Guerrouj (MAR)	3:42.24
2.	Hudson de Souza (BRA)	3:42.51
3.	Paul Korir (KEN)	3:42.55
4.	Ivan Heshko (UKR)	3:42.96
5.	Christian Obrist (ITA)	3:43.01
6.	Juan Carlos Higuero (ESP)	3:43.01
7.	Kevin Sullivan (CAN)	3:43.27
8.	Michal Šneberger (CZE)	3:43.27
9.	Atta Atta Miran (PAK)	3:51.34

RANK	HEAT 3	TIME
1.	Rui Silva (POR)	3:41.35
2.	Isaac Kiprono Songok (KEN)	3:41.55
3.	Roberto Parra (ESP)	3:41.57
4.	Michael East (GBR)	3:41.61
5.	Vyacheslav Shabunin (RUS)	3:41.63
6.	Gareth Turnbull (IRL)	3:41.84
7.	Bert Leenaerts (BEL)	3:42.71
8.	Neil Weare (GUM)	3:56.64
9.	Yahye Abdi Gurre (SOM)	4:10.42
—	Fouad Chouki (FRA)	DQ

== See also ==
- Athletics at the 2003 Pan American Games - Men's 1500 metres
