= 2004 IAAF World Indoor Championships – Men's 1500 metres =

The Men's 1500 metres event at the 2004 IAAF World Indoor Championships was held on 6–7 March 2004.

The winning margin was 0.03 seconds which as of July 2024 remains the joint-narrowest winning margin in the men's 1500 metres at these championships.

== Medalists ==
Gold	Silver	Bronze
Paul Korir; Kenya	Ivan Heshko; Ukraine	Laban Rotich; Kenya

Note: Michael East had originally won the bronze but was disqualified for obstructing Laban Rotich.

== Results ==
=== Heat ===
First 3 of each heat (Q) and next 3 fastest (q) qualified for the semifinals.

Rank	Heat	Name	Nationality	Time	Notes
1	2	Ivan Heshko	Ukraine	3:39.93	Q
2	2	James Thie	Great Britain	3:40.68	Q
3	2	José Antonio Redolat	Spain	3:40.70	Q
4	2	Paul Korir	Kenya	3:40.75	q
5	2	Mirosław Formela	Poland	3:41.22	q
6	2	Youssef Baba	Morocco	3:41.25	q
7	1	Laban Rotich	Kenya	3:41.66	Q
DQ	1	Abdelkader Hachlaf	Morocco	~~3:41.75~~	Q, Doping
8	1	Michael East	Great Britain	3:41.86	Q
9	1	Michal Šneberger	Czech Republic	3:42.11	
10	1	Juan Carlos Higuero	Spain	3:42.25	
11	1	Marko Koers	Netherlands	3:42.53	
12	1	Hudson de Souza	Brazil	3:43.24	SB
13	2	Rob Myers	United States	3:43.73	
14	2	João Pires	Portugal	3:45.48	
15	2	Tim Clerbout	Belgium	3:45.81	
16	1	António Travassos	Portugal	3:46.19	
17	1	James Nolan	Ireland	3:47.27	
18	2	Dmitriy Onufriyenko	Russia	3:47.97	
19	1	Monder Rizki	Belgium	3:49.88	
20	1	Charlie Gruber	United States	3:50.29	
21	2	Jean-Marc Léandro	Gabon	3:56.15	SB
22	1	Ricardo Etheridge	Puerto Rico	3:57.07	PB

=== Final ===
Rank	Name	Nationality	Time	Notes
1st place, gold medalist(s)	Paul Korir	Kenya	3:52.31	
2nd place, silver medalist(s)	Ivan Heshko	Ukraine	3:52.34	
3rd place, bronze medalist(s)	Laban Rotich	Kenya	3:52.93	
DQ	Abdelkader Hachlaf	Morocco	~~3:53.22~~	Doping
4	James Thie	Great Britain	3:53.36	
5	Mirosław Formela	Poland	3:53.70	
6	José Antonio Redolat	Spain	3:56.55	
7	Youssef Baba	Morocco	3:57.79	
	Michael East	Great Britain	DQ	
