= 2003 IAAF World Indoor Championships – Men's 1500 metres =

The men's 1500 metres event at the 2003 IAAF World Indoor Championships was held on 14–15 March 2003.

The winning margin was 0.03 seconds which as of July 2024 remains the joint-narrowest winning margin in the men's 1500 metres at these championships.

== Medalists ==
Gold	Silver	Bronze
Driss Maazouzi; France	Bernard Lagat; Kenya	Abdelkader Hachlaf; Morocco

== Results ==
=== Heats ===
First 2 of each heat (Q) and next 3 fastest (q) qualified for the semifinals.

Rank	Heat	Name	Nationality	Time	Notes
1	2	Bernard Lagat	Kenya	3:39.97	Q
2	2	Roberto Parra	Spain	3:40.40	Q
3	2	Ivan Heshko	Ukraine	3:40.61	q
4	2	Andrey Zadorozhniy	Russia	3:40.80	q, SB
5	2	James Nolan	Ireland	3:40.85	q
6	2	Mirosław Formela	Poland	3:40.89	PB
7	3	Cornelius Chirchir	Kenya	3:41.08	Q
8	2	James Thie	Great Britain	3:41.18	PB
9	3	Juan Carlos Higuero	Spain	3:41.37	Q, SB
10	3	Julius Achon	Uganda	3:41.85	SB
11	3	Anis Selmouni	Morocco	3:41.99	
12	3	Tarek Boukensa	Algeria	3:42.88	
13	3	Jason Lunn	United States	3:43.31	
14	3	Christian Obrist	Italy	3:43.97	
15	3	Philippe Bandi	Switzerland	3:44.37	
16	2	Salvatore Vincenti	Italy	3:45.93	
17	2	Luís Feiteira	Portugal	3:46.99	
18	1	Driss Maazouzi	France	3:48.36	Q
19	1	Abdelkader Hachlaf	Morocco	3:48.39	Q
20	1	Rui Silva	Portugal	3:48.41	
21	1	Michal Šneberger	Czech Republic	3:48.65	
22	1	Michael Stember	United States	3:48.71	
23	1	Michael East	Great Britain	3:49.31	
24	1	Zbigniew Graczyk	Poland	3:49.39	
25	1	Graham Hood	Canada	3:50.86	
26	3	Abdillahi Bouh Moumin	Djibouti	4:15.51	NR

=== Final ===
Rank	Name	Nationality	Time	Notes
1st place, gold medalist(s)	Driss Maazouzi	France	3:42.59	
2nd place, silver medalist(s)	Bernard Lagat	Kenya	3:42.62	
3rd place, bronze medalist(s)	Abdelkader Hachlaf	Morocco	3:42.71	
4	Cornelius Chirchir	Kenya	3:43.03	
5	Ivan Heshko	Ukraine	3:44.56	
6	James Nolan	Ireland	3:44.67	
7	Andrey Zadorozhniy	Russia	3:44.80	
8	Juan Carlos Higuero	Spain	3:44.81	
9	Roberto Parra	Spain	3:47.44	
