= 1999 European Athletics U23 Championships – Men's 1500 metres =

The men's 1500 metres event at the 1999 European Athletics U23 Championships was held in Gothenburg, Sweden, at Ullevi on 29 and 31 July 1999.

== Medalists ==
Gold	Rui Silva; Portugal
Silver	Gert-Jan Liefers; Netherlands
Bronze	Mehdi Baala; France

== Results ==
=== Final ===
31 July

Rank	Name	Nationality	Time	Notes
1st place, gold medalist(s)	Rui Silva	Portugal	3:44.29	
2nd place, silver medalist(s)	Gert-Jan Liefers	Netherlands	3:44.60	
3rd place, bronze medalist(s)	Mehdi Baala	France	3:45.41	
4	Ivan Heshko	Ukraine	3:45.94	
5	Jan Fitschen	Germany	3:45.99	
6	Manuel Damião	Portugal	3:46.41	
7	Gareth Turnbull	Ireland	3:46.79	
8	Yacin Yusuf	United Kingdom	3:46.87	
9	Michal Šneberger	Czech Republic	3:46.88	
10	Pietro Pelusi	Italy	3:47.22	
11	Aleš Tomič	Slovenia	3:49.44	
12	Matthew Dixon	United Kingdom	3:50.79	

=== Heats ===
29 July
Qualified: first 4 in each heat and 4 best to the Final

==== Heat 1 ====
Rank	Name	Nationality	Time	Notes
1	Mehdi Baala	France	3:42.46	Q
2	Gert-Jan Liefers	Netherlands	3:42.84	Q
3	Manuel Damião	Portugal	3:43.61	Q
4	Aleš Tomič	Slovenia	3:43.86	Q
5	Yacin Yusuf	United Kingdom	3:44.00	q
6	Pietro Pelusi	Italy	3:44.14	q
7	Michal Šneberger	Czech Republic	3:45.20	q
8	Daniel Oniciuc	Romania	3:45.30	
9	Pol Guillén	Spain	3:46.28	
10	Robert Neryng	Poland	3:49.40	
11	Lars Kelpien	Germany	3:50.41	
12	Ferenc Békési	Hungary	3:53.69	
	Vanco Stojanov	Macedonia	DNS	

==== Heat 2 ====
Rank	Name	Nationality	Time	Notes
1	Rui Silva	Portugal	3:43.70	Q
2	Gareth Turnbull	Ireland	3:.43.86	Q
3	Ivan Heshko	Ukraine	3:43.94	Q
4	Matthew Dixon	United Kingdom	3:44.06	Q
5	Jan Fitschen	Germany	3:44.10	q
6	Juan Higuero	Spain	3:45.34	
7	Jari Matinlauri	Finland	3:45.58	
8	Michael East	United Kingdom	3:47.09	
9	Christian Thielen	Luxembourg	3:48.31	
10	Roman Hanzel	Slovakia	3:52.07	
11	Mattias Norling	Sweden	3:53.01	
12	Grzegorz Kujawski	Poland	3:54.80	

== Participation ==
According to an unofficial count, 24 athletes from 18 countries participated in the event. The announced athlete from Macedonia did not show.

- Czech Republic (1)
- Finland (1)
- France (1)
- Germany (2)
- Hungary (1)
- Ireland (1)
- Italy (1)
- Luxembourg (1)
- Netherlands (1)
- Poland (2)
- Portugal (2)
- Romania (1)
- Slovakia (1)
- Slovenia (1)
- Spain (2)
- Sweden (1)
- Ukraine (1)
- United Kingdom (3)
