= Timothy Kiptanui =

Kenyan middle-distance runner

Timothy Kiptanui Too (born 5 January 1980 in Kakiptui) is a Kenyan former 1500 metres runner who finished fourth at the 2004 Summer Olympics. His personal best over 1500 m of 3:30.04 minutes, achieved in 2004, was the third best time in the world that season, only behind Bernard Lagat and Hicham El Guerrouj. He won the Memorial Van Damme meet on the 2004 IAAF Golden League circuit.

He graduated from Nanyuki High School in 1999. In 2003 he won two local meetings and run several races in Europe, although mostly as a pacemaker. The 2004 season proved to be the sole highlight of his career as he did not represent Kenya thereafter or win any major meets. He did not compete in top-level competition after 2009.

He is managed by Gianni Demadonna and coached by Francis Songol.

== International competitions ==
| Year | Competition | Venue | Position | Event | Notes |
|---|---|---|---|---|---|
| 2004 | Olympic Games | Athens, Greece | 4th | 1500 m | |
| | World Athletics Final | Monte Carlo, Monaco | 9th | 1500 m | |

== Personal bests ==
- 800 metres - 1:44.49 min (2004)
- 1500 metres - 3:30.04 min (2004)
