= 2006 European Athletics Championships – Men's 1500 metres =

Men's 1500 metres at the European Athletics Championships

The men's 1500 metres at the 2006 European Athletics Championships were held at the Ullevi stadium on August 7 and August 9, 2006.

Baala won gold, successfully defending his 2002 title, while Heshko pipped Higuero on the final stretch.

== Medalists ==
Gold	Silver	Bronze
Mehdi Baala; France	Ivan Heshko; Ukraine	Juan Carlos Higuero; Spain

== Schedule ==
Date	Time	Round
August 7, 2006	19:10	Semifinals
August 9, 2006	19:20	Final

== Results ==
KEY:	q	Fastest non-qualifiers	Q	Qualified	NR	National record	PB	Personal best	SB	Seasonal best

=== Heats ===
First 4 in each heat (Q) and the next 4 fastest (q) advance to the Final.

Rank	Heat	Name	Nationality	Time	Notes
1	2	Mehdi Baala	France	3:39.74	Q
2	2	Mykola Labovskyi	Ukraine	3:40.10	Q
3	2	Juan Carlos Higuero	Spain	3:40.97	Q
4	2	Christian Obrist	Italy	3:41.32	Q
5	2	Mirosław Formela	Poland	3:41.38	q
6	2	Rizak Dirshe	Sweden	3:41.67	q
7	2	Andrew Baddeley	United Kingdom	3:41.92	q
8	2	Liam Reale	Ireland	3:41.97	q
9	2	Manuel Damião	Portugal	3:42.56	
10	2	Carsten Schlangen	Germany	3:42.62	
11	2	Aleksandr Krivchonkov	Russia	3:43.03	
12	2	Daniel Spitzl	Austria	3:46.08	
13	1	Ivan Heshko	Ukraine	3:47.12	Q
14	1	Arturo Casado	Spain	3:47.16	Q
15	1	Sergio Gallardo	Spain	3:47.82	Q
16	1	Michal Šneberger	Czech Republic	3:47.96	Q
17	1	Abdelkader Bakhtache	France	3:48.09	
18	1	Sergey Ivanov	Russia	3:48.27	
19	1	Mounir Yemmouni	France	3:48.34	
20	1	Bob Winter	Netherlands	3:48.35	
21	1	Tim Clerbout	Belgium	3:48.43	
22	1	Joel Bodén	Sweden	3:48.54	
23	1	Stephen Davies	United Kingdom	3:48.64	
24	1	Christian Neunhäuserer	Italy	3:49.34	
25	1	Bård Kvalheim	Norway	3:49.55	
26	1	James Nolan	Ireland	3:49.94	
27	2	Matthieu Vandiest	Belgium	3:50.28	
28	1	Michael East	United Kingdom	4:11.89	
	2	Jonas Hamm	Finland		DNF

=== Final ===
Rank	Name	Nationality	Time	Notes
1st place, gold medalist(s)	Mehdi Baala	France	3:39.02	
2nd place, silver medalist(s)	Ivan Heshko	Ukraine	3:39.50	
3rd place, bronze medalist(s)	Juan Carlos Higuero	Spain	3:39.62	
4	Arturo Casado	Spain	3:40.86	
5	Sergio Gallardo	Spain	3:41.24	
6	Andrew Baddeley	United Kingdom	3:42.31	
7	Christian Obrist	Italy	3:42.59	
8	Liam Reale	Ireland	3:42.65	
9	Rizak Dirshe	Sweden	3:42.87	
10	Mirosław Formela	Poland	3:43.16	
11	Mykola Labovskyi	Ukraine	3:43.47	
12	Michal Šneberger	Czech Republic	3:45.99	
