= James Nolan (athlete) =

Irish middle-distance runner (born 1977)

Personal information
- Nationality: Irish
- Born: 27 January 1977 (age 49) Tullamore, Offaly, Ireland
- Height: 185 cm (6 ft 1 in)
- Weight: 69 kg (152 lb)

Sport
- Sport: Athletics
- Event: Middle distance
- Club: UCD, Dublin
Medal record
Representing Ireland
European Indoor Championships
| Silver medal – second place | 2000 Ghent | 1500 m |

James Nolan (born 27 January 1977) is an Irish athletics coach and a former international runner for the Republic of Ireland from 1996 until 2008. He was a two-time Olympian who specialised in the 800 metres between 1996 and 2000 before changing to the 1500 metres later that year.

He was a silver medalist in the 800 m race at the European Athletics U23 Championships in 1999 and runner up over 1500 metres at the European Athletics Indoor Championships in 2000. He competed twice at the World Championships in Athletics (2001, 2005), three times at the European Athletics Championships (1998, 2002, 2006) and six times at the IAAF World Indoor Championships.

== Career ==
Born in Tullamore, County Offaly, he won his first international medal (a silver) as a teen at the European Youth Summer Olympic Days. During his senior career, he reached the final at the European Indoor Championships on three occasions (1998, 2000 2002, 2007), as well as three appearances in finals at the World Indoor Championships (1998, 2003, 2006). Nolan ran in numerous championships, racing in over 25 countries during his thirteen-year career, though he did not perform close to his best times at major international events. His international racing wound down with a final showing at the 2008 IAAF World Indoor Championships: later that year he was unable to qualify for the 2008 Olympics and he retired in early January 2009 (four years after his Irish Sports Council grant was withdrawn citing injury problems).

He had a longer career and more consistently qualified for championships than contemporaries such as David Matthews and Gareth Turnbull but as stated after his earlier medal wins struggled particularly at outdoor events to do more than qualify for championships. Nolan was involved in a well publicised row in 2004 when RTÉ's commentator Jerry Kiernan accused him of being a dilettante at that year's Olympics. The controversy brought Nolan to the attention of the wider Irish public when he launched a savage attack on the pundit in response.

He set personal bests of 1:46.05 minutes for the 800 m (1999) and 3:35.69 minutes in the 1500 m (2003) and won the British AAA Championships title in the 800 event at the 1997 AAA Championships.

He is now a sports coach, having graduated from University College Dublin (UCD) in 2008, which he attended from 1996-2001 on a sports scholarship and then 2005-2008, with a BSc in sports management and he is now involved with projects such as the fastkids website. Nolan was appointed head of athletics by the Paralympic Council of Ireland in 2009 and is also middle distance coach at his old university UCD for 2010/11. He is married to Afton whom he met whilst he trained regularly in South Africa between 2001 and 2005.

== International competitions ==
Representing Ireland
| Year | Competition | Venue | Position | Event | Notes |
|---|---|---|---|---|---|
| 1993 | European Youth Summer Olympic Days | Valkenswaard, Netherlands | 2nd | 800 m | 1:53.45 |
| 1996 | European Indoor Championships | Stockholm, Sweden | 11th (h) | 800 m | 1:51.68 |
| 1996 | World Junior Championships | Sydney, Australia | 8th | 800 m | 1:51.88 |
| 1997 | World Indoor Championships | Paris, France | 11th (semis) | 800 m | 1:48.75 |
| 1997 | European U23 Championships | Turku, Finland | 5th | 800 m | 1:47.98 |
| 1998 | European Indoor Championships | Valencia, Spain | 4th | 800 m | 1:47.81 |
| 1998 | European Championships | Budapest, Hungary | 13th (semis) | 800 m | 1:48.50 |
| 1999 | World Indoor Championships | Maebashi, Japan | 5th | 800 m | 1:47.77 |
| 1999 | European U23 Championships | Gothenburg, Sweden | 2nd | 800 m | 1:46.94 |
| 2000 | European Indoor Championships | Ghent, Belgium | 2nd | 1500 m | 3:41.59 |
| 2000 | Olympic Games | Sydney, Australia | 23rd (h) | 1500 m | 3:40.50 |
| 2001 | Universiade | Beijing, China | — | 1500 m | DNF |
| 2001 | World Championships | Edmonton, Canada | 30th (h) | 1500 m | 3:42.84 |
| 2002 | European Indoor Championships | Vienna, Austria | 6th | 1500 m | 3:50.84 |
| 2002 | European Championships | Munich, Germany | 18th (h) | 1500 m | 3:48.48 |
| 2003 | World Indoor Championships | Birmingham, United Kingdom | 6th | 1500 m | 3:44.67 |
| 2004 | World Indoor Championships | Budapest, Hungary | 17th (h) | 1500 m | 3:47.27 |
| 2004 | Olympic Games | Athens, Greece | 18th (semis) | 1500 m | 3:42.61 |
| 2005 | European Indoor Championships | Madrid, Spain | 18th (h) | 1500 m | 3:46.50 |
| 2005 | World Championships | Helsinki, Finland | 28th (h) | 1500 m | 3:42.53 |
| 2006 | World Indoor Championships | Moscow, Russia | 6th | 1500 m | 3:43.98 |
| 2006 | European Championships | Gothenburg, Sweden | 26th (h) | 1500 m | 3:49.94 |
| 2007 | European Indoor Championships | Birmingham, United Kingdom | 7th | 1500 m | 3:46.34 |
| 2008 | World Indoor Championships | Valencia, Spain | 14th (h) | 1500 m | 3:42.12 |

== Personal bests ==
- 800 metres - 1:46.05 min (1999)
- 1500 metres - 3:35.69 min (2003)
- Mile run - 3:54.50 min (2003)
- 3000 metres - 7:52.84 min (2006)

== See also ==
- List of European Athletics Indoor Championships medalists (men)
- Ireland at the 2006 European Athletics Championships
