= 2000 World Junior Championships in Athletics – Men's 1500 metres =

The men's 1500 metres event at the 2000 World Junior Championships in Athletics was held in Santiago, Chile, at Estadio Nacional Julio Martínez Prádanos on 20 and 22 October.

== Medalists ==
Gold	Cornelius Chirchir; Kenya
Silver	Wolfram Müller; Germany
Bronze	Philemon Tanui; Kenya

== Results ==
=== Final ===
22 October

Rank	Name	Nationality	Time	Notes
1st place, gold medalist(s)	Cornelius Chirchir	Kenya	3:38.80	
2nd place, silver medalist(s)	Wolfram Müller	Germany	3:39.37	
3rd place, bronze medalist(s)	Philemon Tanui	Kenya	3:40.77	
4	Jamal Noor	Qatar	3:42.27	
5	Johan Cronje	South Africa	3:42.52	
6	Ridouane Harroufi	Morocco	3:43.34	
7	Abubaker Kamal	Qatar	3:44.12	
8	Tarek Boukensa	Algeria	3:44.46	
9	Duncan Long	Australia	3:44.76	
10	Álvaro Fernández	Spain	3:45.51	
11	Javier Areny	Spain	3:50.19	
	Julius Ogwang	Uganda	DNS	

=== Heats ===
20 October

==== Heat 1 ====
Rank	Name	Nationality	Time	Notes
1	Jamal Noor	Qatar	3:47.48	Q
2	Tarek Boukensa	Algeria	3:47.86	Q
3	Wolfram Müller	Germany	3:47.89	Q
4	Stefan Beumer	Netherlands	3:48.99	
5	Lee Du-Haeng	South Korea	3:49.25	
6	Bruno Silva	Portugal	3:50.10	
7	Heleodoro Navarro	Mexico	3:51.75	
8	Guillaume Eraud	France	3:53.41	
9	Berhanu Tadele	Ethiopia	3:55.74	
10	Ahmed Abdillahi	Djibouti	4:02.85	
11	Lawrence Lockhart	U.S. Virgin Islands	4:27.48	

==== Heat 2 ====
Rank	Name	Nationality	Time	Notes
1	Cornelius Chirchir	Kenya	3:44.89	Q
2	Julius Ogwang	Uganda	3:45.16	Q
3	Abubaker Kamal	Qatar	3:45.71	Q
4	Johan Cronje	South Africa	3:45.88	q
5	Álvaro Fernández	Spain	3:46.67	q
6	Lorenzo Perrone	Italy	3:49.66	
7	Modisa Leselamose	Botswana	3:54.07	
8	Chaminda Wijekoon	Sri Lanka	3:54.34	
9	David Byrne	Australia	3:58.50	
10	Rocky Mkoko	Swaziland	4:03.11	
11	Bed Bahadur Bhattarai	Nepal	4:12.45	
12	Moreira Nataniel	Cape Verde	4:54.37	
	Ismail Ahmed Ismail	Sudan	DQ	

==== Heat 3 ====
Rank	Name	Nationality	Time	Notes
1	Philemon Tanui	Kenya	3:46.53	Q
2	Ridouane Harroufi	Morocco	3:46.86	Q
3	Duncan Long	Australia	3:46.94	Q
4	Javier Areny	Spain	3:47.59	q
5	Conor Sweeney	Ireland	3:47.98	
6	Kiyoharo Sato	Japan	3:49.68	
7	Dereje Lema	Ethiopia	3:51.24	
8	Thomas Bonn	United States	3:52.69	
9	Samson Ramadhani	Tanzania	3:56.74	
10	Sergio Solís	Guatemala	4:07.98	
11	Sidi Mohamed Ould Bidjel	Mauritania	4:08.05	
12	Setefano Mika	Samoa	4:15.37	
13	Keith Sepety	Federated States of Micronesia	4:51.29	

== Participation ==
According to an unofficial count, 37 athletes from 32 countries participated in the event.

- Algeria (1)
- Australia (2)
- Botswana (1)
- Cape Verde (1)
- Djibouti (1)
- Ethiopia (2)
- France (1)
- Germany (1)
- Guatemala (1)
- Ireland (1)
- Italy (1)
- Japan (1)
- Kenya (2)
- Mauritania (1)
- Mexico (1)
- Federated States of Micronesia (1)
- Morocco (1)
- Nepal (1)
- Netherlands (1)
- Portugal (1)
- Qatar (2)
- Samoa (1)
- South Africa (1)
- South Korea (1)
- Spain (2)
- Sri Lanka (1)
- Sudan (1)
- Swaziland (1)
- Tanzania (1)
- Uganda (1)
- United States (1)
- U.S. Virgin Islands (1)
