= 2005 European Athletics Indoor Championships – Men's 1500 metres =

The Men's 1500 metres event at the 2005 European Athletics Indoor Championships was held on March 4–6.

== Medalists ==
Gold	Silver	Bronze
Ivan Heshko; Ukraine	Juan Carlos Higuero; Spain	Reyes Estévez; Spain

== Results ==
=== Heats ===
First 3 of each heat (Q) and the next 3 fastest (q) qualified for the final.

Rank	Heat	Name	Nationality	Time	Notes
1	1	Ivan Heshko	Ukraine	3:42.70	Q
2	1	Juan Carlos Higuero	Spain	3:42.90	Q, SB
3	1	Wolfram Müller	Germany	3:43.16	Q
4	2	Arturo Casado	Spain	3:43.37	Q
5	2	James Thie	Great Britain	3:43.67	Q
6	2	Reyes Estévez	Spain	3:43.84	Q
7	2	Sébastien Cosson	France	3:43.86	q
8	1	Joeri Jansen	Belgium	3:43.92	q
9	2	Christian Obrist	Italy	3:44.21	q
10	2	Mirosław Formela	Poland	3:44.43	
11	1	Marcel Ionascu	Romania	3:44.52	PB
12	2	Vyacheslav Shabunin	Russia	3:44.56	
13	1	Ed Jackson	Great Britain	3:44.68	
14	1	Guillaume Eraud	France	3:45.20	
15	1	Jared Shegumo	Poland	3:45.46	
16	1	Rafał Snochowski	Poland	3:45.67	
17	2	Halil Akkas	Turkey	3:46.39	
18	2	James Nolan	Ireland	3:46.50	
19	1	Michal Šneberger	Czech Republic	3:49.49	
20	2	David Fiegen	Luxembourg	3:49.50	
21	1	João Pires	Portugal	3:50.51	
22	2	Gauti Johannesson	Iceland	3:50.67	
23	2	Tim Clerbout	Belgium	3:51.89	
24	1	Neil Speaight	Great Britain	3:52.53	
25	2	Dmitriy Onufriyenko	Russia	3:53.26	
26	1	Stanislav Chucharkin	Russia	3:58.15	
27	2	Robertas Geralavičius	Lithuania	3:59.09	

=== Final ===
Rank	Name	Nationality	Time	Notes
1st place, gold medalist(s)	Ivan Heshko	Ukraine	3:36.70	CR
2nd place, silver medalist(s)	Juan Carlos Higuero	Spain	3:37.98	SB
3rd place, bronze medalist(s)	Reyes Estévez	Spain	3:38.90	
4	Arturo Casado	Spain	3:38.94	
5	Joeri Jansen	Belgium	3:40.12	PB
6	James Thie	Great Britain	3:40.76	
7	Wolfram Müller	Germany	3:46.35	
8	Sébastien Cosson	France	3:48.71	
9	Christian Obrist	Italy	3:52.20	
