= Charlie Gruber =

American middle-distance runner

Charlie Gruber is an American retired middle-distance runner who was on the US 2004 Summer Olympic team.

== College career ==
Gruber raced for the Kansas Jayhawks where he was a 5-time All-American and 5-time Big 12 Conference champion.

== International career ==
Gruber won the 2004 Prefontaine Classic at 1500m. Gruber followed this performance with a 2nd-place finish at the Olympic Trials earning him a place to the 2004 Olympics. At the Olympics in the 1500 meters he finished 27th in the heats and did not advance.

Gruber was also the United States cross country champion in 2004.

Gruber also competed in the 2004 IAAF World Indoor Championships where he finished 20th in the 1500 meters.
