= 2007 European Athletics Indoor Championships – Men's 1500 metres =

The Men's 1500 metres event at the 2007 European Athletics Indoor Championships was held on March 3–4.

== Medalists ==
Gold	Silver	Bronze
Juan Carlos Higuero; Spain	Sergio Gallardo; Spain	Arturo Casado; Spain

== Results ==
=== Heats ===
First 3 of each heat (Q) and the next 3 fastest (q) qualified for the final.

Rank	Heat	Name	Nationality	Time	Notes
1	2	Juan Carlos Higuero	Spain	3:43.02	Q
2	2	Abdelkader Bakhtache	France	3:43.21	Q, PB
3	2	Sergio Gallardo	Spain	3:43.24	Q
4	2	James Nolan	Ireland	3:43.57	q
5	2	James Thie	Great Britain	3:44.15	q, SB
6	2	Joeri Jansen	Belgium	3:45.09	q
7	2	Vyacheslav Shabunin	Russia	3:45.86	
8	2	Björn Margeirsson	Iceland	3:46.25	PB
9	1	Arturo Casado	Spain	3:46.76	Q
10	1	Barnabás Bene	Hungary	3:47.07	Q
11	1	Mounir Yemmouni	France	3:47.24	Q
12	1	Aleksey Popov	Russia	3:47.61	
13	1	Ate van der Burgt	Netherlands	3:47.66	
14	2	Liam Reale	Ireland	3:47.94	
15	1	Rizak Dirshe	Sweden	3:48.45	
16	1	Joachim Brøndbo	Norway	3:48.72	
17	2	Cene Šubic	Slovenia	3:49.50	
18	1	Cristian Vorovenci	Romania	3:50.26	
19	1	Chris Warburton	Great Britain	3:50.38	
20	2	Michiel Löschner	Netherlands	3:51.35	
21	1	Gareth Turnbull	Ireland	3:52.20	
22	1	Sevak Yeghikyan	Armenia	3:58.91	NR

=== Final ===
Rank	Name	Nationality	Time	Notes
1st place, gold medalist(s)	Juan Carlos Higuero	Spain	3:44.41	
2nd place, silver medalist(s)	Sergio Gallardo	Spain	3:44.51	
3rd place, bronze medalist(s)	Arturo Casado	Spain	3:44.73	
4	Abdelkader Bakhtache	France	3:45.54	
5	Barnabás Bene	Hungary	3:45.58	
6	Mounir Yemmouni	France	3:46.11	
7	James Nolan	Ireland	3:46.34	
8	Joeri Jansen	Denmark	3:46.82	
9	James Thie	Great Britain	3:47.00	
