= 2002 European Athletics Indoor Championships – Men's 1500 metres =

The men's 1500 metres event at the 2002 European Athletics Indoor Championships was held on March 1–2.

== Medalists ==
Gold	Silver	Bronze
Rui Silva; Portugal	Juan Carlos Higuero; Spain	Michael East; Great Britain

== Results ==
=== Heats ===
First 3 of each heat (Q) and the next 3 fastest (q) qualified for the semifinals.

Rank	Heat	Name	Nationality	Time	Notes
1	1	Michael East	Great Britain	3:40.52	Q, PB
2	1	Andrey Zadorozhniy	Russia	3:40.60	Q, SB
3	1	Juan Carlos Higuero	Spain	3:40.67	Q
4	1	James Nolan	Ireland	3:40.78	q
5	1	Branko Zorko	Croatia	3:40.93	q
6	1	Michal Šneberger	Czech Republic	3:41.01	q
7	1	Alexis Abraham	France	3:41.24	
8	2	Vyacheslav Shabunin	Russia	3:42.51	Q
9	2	Rui Silva	Portugal	3:42.72	Q
10	2	Saïd Chébili	France	3:43.25	Q
11	1	Luís Feiteira	Portugal	3:43.46	
12	2	Sergio Gallardo	Spain	3:43.67	PB
13	2	Angus MacLean	Great Britain	3:44.30	
14	2	Pedro Antonio Esteso	Spain	3:44.32	
15	2	Sebastien Cosson	France	3:45.03	
16	2	Panagiotis Stroubakos	Greece	3:46.54	
17	2	Stefan Matschiner	Austria	3:47.51	
18	1	Roland Waldner	Austria	3:48.36	SB
19	1	Darko Radomirović	Yugoslavia	3:54.40	
20	2	Jürgen Vandewiele	Belgium	3:55.98	

=== Final ===
Rank	Name	Nationality	Time	Notes
1st place, gold medalist(s)	Rui Silva	Portugal	3:49.93	
2nd place, silver medalist(s)	Juan Carlos Higuero	Spain	3:50.08	
3rd place, bronze medalist(s)	Michael East	Great Britain	3:50.52	
4	Branko Zorko	Croatia	3:50.66	
5	Michal Šneberger	Czech Republic	3:50.70	
6	James Nolan	Ireland	3:50.84	
7	Saïd Chébili	France	3:51.00	
8	Andrey Zadorozhniy	Russia	3:51.48	
9	Vyacheslav Shabunin	Russia	3:52.52	
