= 2001 European Athletics U23 Championships – Men's 1500 metres =

The men's 1500 metres event at the 2001 European Athletics U23 Championships was held in Amsterdam, Netherlands, at Olympisch Stadion on 12 and 14 July.

== Medalists ==
Gold	Wolfram Müller; Germany
Silver	Ivan Heshko; Ukraine
Bronze	Sergio Gallardo; Spain

== Results ==
=== Final ===
14 July

Rank	Name	Nationality	Time	Notes
1st place, gold medalist(s)	Wolfram Müller	Germany	3:38.94	CR
2nd place, silver medalist(s)	Ivan Heshko	Ukraine	3:39.37	
3rd place, bronze medalist(s)	Sergio Gallardo	Spain	3:39.50	
4	Christian Obrist	Italy	3:39.58	
5	Angus MacLean	Great Britain	3:41.36	
6	Francisco Javier Alves	Spain	3:41.67	
7	Franek Haschke	Germany	3:41.93	
8	Sébastien Cosson	France	3:42.23	
9	Gareth Turnbull	Ireland	3:42.78	
10	James Bowler	Great Britain	3:44.39	
11	Lorenzo Perrone	Italy	3:45.36	
12	Conor Sweeney	Ireland	3:47.43	

=== Heats ===
12 July
Qualified: first 4 in each heat and 4 best to the Final

==== Heat 1 ====
Rank	Name	Nationality	Time	Notes
1	Franek Haschke	Germany	3:45.94	Q
2	Ivan Heshko	Ukraine	3:46.40	Q
3	Angus MacLean	Great Britain	3:46.45	Q
4	Lorenzo Perrone	Italy	3:46.89	Q
5	Conor Sweeney	Ireland	3:46.97	q
6	Guillaime Eraud	France	3:47.21	
7	Xavier Areny	Spain	3:48.18	
8	Ionut Bura	Romania	3:52.03	
	Fouzi El Kholti	France	DNS	

==== Heat 2 ====
Rank	Name	Nationality	Time	Notes
1	Wolfram Müller	Germany	3:43.73	Q
2	Sergio Gallardo	Spain	3:43.94	Q
3	Gareth Turnbull	Ireland	3:44.02	Q
4	Christian Obrist	Italy	3:44.05	Q
5	Francisco Javier Alves	Spain	3:44.38	q
6	Sébastien Cosson	France	3:44.88	q
7	James Bowler	Great Britain	3:44.88	q
8	Matthieu Vandiest	Belgium	3:51.71	

== Participation ==
According to an unofficial count, 16 athletes from 9 countries participated in the event.

- Belgium (1)
- France (2)
- Germany (2)
- Great Britain (2)
- Ireland (2)
- Italy (2)
- Romania (1)
- Spain (3)
- Ukraine (1)
