= Juan Carlos Higuero =

Spanish middle-distance runner

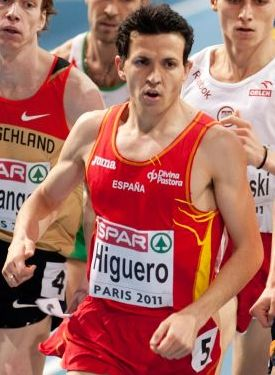
Higuero at the 2011 European Indoor Championships.

Juan Carlos Higuero Mate (born 3 August 1978) is a Spanish middle distance runner, who mostly concentrates on the 1500 metres. He was born in Aranda de Duero, Burgos.

At the 2006 European Championships in Athletics Higuero won two bronze medals, over 1500 and 5000 metres. It was his international major event debut in the 5000 metres. He already had two silver medals from the European Indoor Championships.

== Achievements ==
Year	Competition	Venue	Position	Event	Notes
Representing Spain
1997	European Junior Championships	Ljubljana, Slovenia	6th	5000 m	14:31.79
1999	European U23 Championships	Gothenburg, Sweden	14th (h)	1500 m	3:45.34
2000	European Indoor Championships	Ghent, Belgium	6th	1500 m	3:44.07
2000	Olympic Games	Sydney, Australia	8th	1500 m	3:38.91
2001	World Indoor Championships	Lisbon, Portugal	9th	1500 m	3:56.71
2002	European Indoor Championships	Vienna, Austria	2nd	1500 m	3:50.08
2002	European Championships	Munich, Germany	5th	1500 m	3:45.81
2003	World Indoor Championships	Birmingham, United Kingdom	8th	1500 m	3:44.81
2003	World Championships	Paris, France	11th	1500 m	3:38.49
2004	World Indoor Championships	Budapest, Hungary	10th (h)	1500 m	3:42.25
2004	Olympic Games	Athens, Greece	17th (h)	1500 m	3:42.13
2005	European Indoor Championships	Madrid, Spain	2nd	1500 m	3:37.98
2005	World Championships	Helsinki, Finland	6th	1500 m	3:40.34
2005	World Athletics Final	Monte Carlo, Monaco	10th	1500 m	3:45.45
2006	European Championships	Gothenburg, Sweden	3rd	1500 m	3:39.62
2006	European Championships	Gothenburg, Sweden	3rd	5000 m	13:46.48
2007	European Indoor Championships	Birmingham, United Kingdom	1st	1500 m	3:44.41
2007	World Championships	Osaka, Japan	13th	1500 m	3:38.43
2008	World Indoor Championships	Valencia, Spain	3rd	1500 m	3:38.82
2008	Olympic Games	Beijing, China	4th	1500 m	3:34.44
2009	World Championships	Berlin, Germany	14th (sf)	1500 m	3:37.33
2011	European Indoor Championships	Paris, France	6th	1500 m	3:42.29
2011	European Team Championships	Stockholm, Sweden	1st	3000 m	8:03.43
2013	European Indoor Championships	Gothenburg, Sweden	2nd	3000 m	7:50.26

=== Personal bests ===
- 800 metres - 1:45.87 min (2007)
- 1500 metres - 3:31.57 min (2006)
- Mile - 3:52.49 min (2002)
- 3000 metres - 7:59.76 min (1999)
- 5000 metres - 13:33.65 min (2006)
