= Michal Šneberger =

Czech middle distance runner (born 1978)

Michal Šneberger (born 23 June 1978 in Plzeň) is a Czech middle-distance runner.

== Achievements ==
Year	Competition	Venue	Position	Event	Notes
Representing the Czech Republic
1999	European U23 Championships	Gothenburg, Sweden	9th	1500m	3:46.88
2002	European Indoor Championships	Vienna, Austria	5th	1500 m	3:50.70
2003	World Indoor Championships	Birmingham, United Kingdom	21st (h)	1500 m	3:48.65
2003	World Championships	Paris, France	20th (h)	1500 m	3:42.25
2004	World Indoor Championships	Budapest, Hungary	9th (h)	1500 m	3:42.11
2004	Summer Olympics	Athens, Greece	49th (h)	800 m	1:47.89
2004	Summer Olympics	Athens, Greece	23rd (sf)	1500 m	3:47.03
2005	European Indoor Championships	Madrid, Spain	19th (h)	1500 m	3:49.49
2006	European Championships	Gothenburg, Sweden	12th	1500 m	3:45.99
