= Athletics at the 2001 Summer Universiade – Men's 1500 metres =

The men's 1500 metres event at the 2001 Summer Universiade was held at the Workers Stadium in Beijing, China on 27–29 August.

== Medalists ==
Gold	Silver	Bronze
Pedro Antonio Esteso; Spain	Gareth Turnbull; Ireland	Aléxis Abraham; France

== Results ==
=== Heats ===
Rank	Heat	Athlete	Nationality	Time	Notes
1	3	Michael Stember	United States	3:45.42	Q
2	3	Gareth Turnbull	Ireland	3:45.60	Q
3	3	Aléxis Abraham	France	3:45.87	Q
4	3	Sergio Gallardo	Spain	3:46.03	q
5	3	Ryan McKenzie	Canada	3:48.40	q
6	3	Johan Cronje	South Africa	3:48.74	q
7	1	James Nolan	Ireland	3:48.79	Q
8	1	Angus MacLean	Great Britain	3:48.86	Q
9	1	Lee Du-Haeng	South Korea	3:49.28	Q
10	1	Ivan Heshko	Ukraine	3:49.66	
11	1	Leszek Zblewski	Poland	3:51.07	
12	2	Pedro Antonio Esteso	Spain	3:51.12	Q
13	2	Jonathon Riley	United States	3:51.31	Q
14	2	Martin Okello	Uganda	3:51.48	Q
15	2	Steve Willis	New Zealand	3:51.86	
16	2	Nour Bahnisse	Morocco	3:52.37	
17	2	Alex Hutchinson	Canada	3:52.66	
18	1	Abderrahmane Menaa	Algeria	3:52.94	
19	1	Carl Jackson	New Zealand	3:54.44	
20	2	Kjetil Hodnekvam	Norway	3:56.69	
21	3	Mikhail Yeginov	Russia	3:57.81	
22	1	Kabemba Mwape	Zambia	4:00.15	
23	2	Ahmad Al-Matari	Jordan	4:06.05	
24	1	Selvin Molineros	Guatemala	4:06.67	
25	1	Gerald Grech	Malta	4:06.72	
26	3	Majed Al-Bousafi	Oman	4:10.39	
27	2	Iao Kuan Un	Macau	4:12.94	
28	3	So Hoi Nam	Hong Kong	4:14.50	
29	3	Ng Kian Kok	Singapore	4:14.82	
30	2	Mohamed Al-Azri	Oman	4:15.47	
31	1	Mohamed Ashadur Rahman	Bangladesh	4:19.71	
32	3	Paolo Cueva	Peru	4:27.11	
33	1	Kin Fai U	Macau	4:33.80	

=== Final ===
Rank	Athlete	Nationality	Time	Notes
1st place, gold medalist(s)	Pedro Antonio Esteso	Spain	3:43.98	
2nd place, silver medalist(s)	Gareth Turnbull	Ireland	3:44.21	
3rd place, bronze medalist(s)	Aléxis Abraham	France	3:44.48	
4	Michael Stember	United States	3:44.91	
5	Sergio Gallardo	Spain	3:44.91	
6	Johan Cronje	South Africa	3:45.32	
7	Martin Okello	Uganda	3:45.53	
8	Angus MacLean	Great Britain	3:46.24	
9	Jonathon Riley	United States	3:46.37	
10	Lee Du-Haeng	South Korea	3:48.59	
11	Ryan McKenzie	Canada	3:52.95	
	James Nolan	Ireland	DNF	
