= Athletics at the 2004 Summer Olympics – Men's 1500 metres =

Men's 1500 metres at the Games of the XXVIII Olympiad
- Olympic Athletics
- Venue: Athens Olympic Stadium
- Dates: 20–24 August
- Competitors: 38 from 26 nations
- Winning time: 3:34.19

Medalists
1st place, gold medalist(s)		Hicham El Guerrouj; Morocco
2nd place, silver medalist(s)		Bernard Lagat; Kenya
3rd place, bronze medalist(s)		Rui Silva; Portugal

The men's 1500 metres at the 2004 Summer Olympics as part of the athletics program were held at the Athens Olympic Stadium from August 20 to 24. Thirty-eight athletes from 26 nations competed. The event was won by Hicham El Guerrouj of Morocco, the nation's first title in the event after coming second twice (1992 and 2000); El Guerrouj was the fifth man to win a second medal in the event. Bernard Lagat's silver put Kenya on the podium in the event for the third straight year; the United States (six times from 1896 to 1920) and Great Britain (four times from 1908 to 1924 and three times from 1980 to 1988) were the only other nations to have accomplished that. It also made Lagat the sixth man to win two medals in the event, just behind El Guerrouj in both 2000 and 2004. Rui Silva's bronze was Portugal's first medal in the event.

== Summary ==
World record holder Hicham El Guerrouj came into the race with a target on his back. Though El Guerrouj had won four straight World Championships, he had failed to win the previous Olympics, falling with a lap to go in his breakthrough year of 1996 and being beaten to the line in 2000 by the same Noah Ngeny who had chased El Guerrouj to the mile world record a year earlier. Ngeny was not back but bronze medalist Bernard Lagat was, seeking to finally beat El Guerrouj. Lagat had the potential assistance of two Kenyan teammates, but El Guerrouj also had his teammate Adil Kaouch make the final and Kaouch had previously sacrificed himself by acting as a pacesetter leading El Guerrouj to the 1999 and 2001 world titles. Because of the assistance, El Guerrouj's ability in a strategic race was suspect.

Off the line, the three Kenyan runners took the lead and formed a wall keeping the field behind as they slowed the pace; El Guerrouj could not run away from the start and the race would be strategic. With 500 metres to go, El Guerrouj worked his way to the front, with a line of kickers including Lagat, Reyes Estevez, Ivan Heshko and the unknown Mulugeta Wendimu lined up behind him. Down the backstretch, Lagat stayed a step behind El Guerrouj as other speedsters jockeyed for position and then fell back. From deep in the pack (dead last with less than 500 metres to go), Rui Silva was on the outside passing the others. Around the final turn, Lagat edged his way closer to El Guerrouj, pulling even just at the head of the stretch, with Silva gaining to just a step behind. By halfway down the home stretch, Lagat edged into the lead, but El Guerrouj did not go away, fighting back to take the win as Lagat gave up the fight a couple of steps before the line. After clearly running the fastest last lap, Silva was unable to make any further headway, celebrating his bronze medal as he finished.

Four days later, El Guerrouj outsprinted 10000 metres gold medalist Kenenisa Bekele to take the 5000 metres gold medal and never competed internationally again, officially retiring in 2006.

== Background ==
This was the 25th appearance of the event, which is one of 12 athletics events to have been held at every Summer Olympics. Half of the finalists from 2000, including four of the top five but not the defending champion, returned: silver medalist Hicham El Guerrouj of Morocco, bronze medalist Bernard Lagat of Kenya, fourth-place finisher Mehdi Baala of France, fifth-place finisher Kevin Sullivan of Canada, eighth-place finisher Juan Carlos Higuero of Spain, and twelfth-place finisher Youssef Baba of Morocco. El Guerrouj (who had stretched his world championship streak to four and still held the world record) and Lagat were the strongest contenders; Lagat and Baala had finished second to El Guerrouj at the last two world championships.

Bahrain, Brunei, the Czech Republic, and Guam each made their first appearance in the event. The United States made its 24th appearance, most of all nations (having missed only the boycotted 1980 Games).

== Qualification ==
The qualification period for athletics was 1 January 2003 to 9 August 2004. For the men's 1500 metres, each National Olympic Committee was permitted to enter up to three athletes that had run the race in 3:36.20 or faster during the qualification period. The maximum number of athletes per nation had been set at 3 since the 1930 Olympic Congress. If an NOC had no athletes that qualified under that standard, one athlete that had run the race in 3:38.00 or faster could be entered.

== Competition format ==
The competition was again three rounds (used previously in 1952 and since 1964). The "fastest loser" system introduced in 1964 was used for both the first round and semifinals. The 12-man semifinals and finals introduced in 1984 and used since 1992 were retained.

As in 2000, there were three heats in the first round, each with 13 or 14 runners (before withdrawals). There was a slight move towards "fastest losers" advancing, with only the top five runners in each heat, along with the next nine fastest overall, advancing to the semifinals. The 24 semifinalists were divided into two semifinals, each with 12 runners. The top five men in each semifinal, plus the next two fastest overall, advanced to the 12-man final.

== Records ==
Prior to the competition, the existing World record, Olympic record, and world leading time were as follows:

World record	Hicham El Guerrouj (MAR)	3:26.00	Rome, Italy	14 July 1998
Olympic record	Noah Ngeny (KEN)	3:32.07	Sydney, Australia	29 September 2000
World Leading	Bernard Lagat (KEN)	3:27.40	Zurich, Switzerland	6 August 2004

No new world or Olympic records were set during the competition. The following national records were established during the competition:

Nation	Athlete	Round	Time
Equatorial Guinea	Roberto Mandje	Heat 1	4:03.37

== Schedule ==
All times are Eastern European Summer Time (UTC+3)

Date	Time	Round
Friday, 20 August 2004	19:40	Round 1
Sunday, 22 August 2004	21:50	Semifinals
Tuesday, 24 August 2004	23:40	Final

== Results ==
=== Round 1 ===
Qualification rule: The first five finishers in each heat (Q) plus the next nine fastest overall runners (q) advanced to the semifinals.

==== Heat 1 ====
Rank	Athlete	Nation	Time	Notes
1	Hicham El Guerrouj	Morocco	3:37.86	Q
2	Rui Silva	Portugal	3:37.98	Q
3	Álvaro Fernández	Spain	3:38.34	Q
4	Kamal Boulahfane	Algeria	3:38.59	Q
5	Isaac Kiprono Songok	Kenya	3:38.89	Q
6	Kevin Sullivan	Canada	3:39.30	q
7	Michal Šneberger	Czech Republic	3:39.68	q
8	James Nolan	Ireland	3:41.14	q
9	Wolfram Müller	Germany	3:46.75	
10	Mounir Yemmouni	France	3:51.08	
11	Grant Robison	United States	3:53.66	
12	Roberto Mandje	Equatorial Guinea	4:03.37	NR
—	Peter Roko Ashak	Sudan	DNS	

==== Heat 2 ====
Rank	Athlete	Nation	Time	Notes
1	Reyes Estévez	Spain	3:39.71	Q
2	Bernard Lagat	Kenya	3:39.80	Q
3	Nick Willis	New Zealand	3:39.80	Q
4	Adil Kaouch	Morocco	3:39.88	Q
5	Mulugeta Wendimu	Ethiopia	3:39.96	Q
6	Gert-Jan Liefers	Netherlands	3:40.10	q
7	Hudson de Souza	Brazil	3:40.78	q
8	Johan Cronje	South Africa	3:40.99	q
9	Alan Webb	United States	3:41.25	
10	Aleksandr Krivchinkov	Russia	3:41.37	
11	Abdulrahman Suleiman	Qatar	3:42.00	
12	Mohamed Khaldi	Algeria	3:42.47	
13	Mehdi Baala	France	3:46.06	

==== Heat 3 ====
Rank	Athlete	Nation	Time	Notes
1	Michael East	Great Britain	3:37.37	Q
2	Timothy Kiptanui	Kenya	3:37.71	Q
3	Ivan Heshko	Ukraine	3:37.78	Q
4	Rashid Ramzi	Bahrain	3:37.93	Q
5	Tarek Boukensa	Algeria	3:37.94	Q
6	Juan Carlos Higuero	Spain	3:38.36	q
7	Youssef Baba	Morocco	3:38.71	q
8	Manuel Damião	Portugal	3:39.94	q
9	Charlie Gruber	United States	3:41.73	
10	Branko Zorko	Croatia	3:48.28	
11	Dou Zhaobo	China	3:50.28	
12	Neil Weare	Guam	4:05.86	
13	Jimmy Anak Ahar	Brunei	4:14.11	
—	Samwel Mwera	Tanzania	DNS	

=== Semifinals ===
Qualification rule: The top five finishers in each heat (Q) plus the next two fastest overall runners (q) advanced to the final.

==== Semifinal 1 ====
Rank	Athlete	Nation	Time	Notes
1	Adil Kaouch	Morocco	3:35.69	Q
2	Bernard Lagat	Kenya	3:35.84	Q
3	Gert-Jan Liefers	Netherlands	3:36.00	Q
4	Reyes Estévez	Spain	3:36.05	Q
5	Ivan Heshko	Ukraine	3:36.20	Q
6	Michael East	Great Britain	3:36.46	q
7	Isaac Kiprono Songok	Kenya	3:37.10	q
8	Manuel Damião	Portugal	3:37.16	
9	Hudson de Souza	Brazil	3:38.83	
10	James Nolan	Ireland	3:42.61	
11	Rashid Ramzi	Bahrain	3:44.60	
—	Tarek Boukensa	Algeria	DNF	

==== Semifinal 2 ====
Rank	Athlete	Nation	Time	Notes
1	Hicham El Guerrouj	Morocco	3:40.87	Q
2	Rui Silva	Portugal	3:40.99	Q
3	Timothy Kiptanui	Kenya	3:41.04	Q
4	Mulugeta Wendimu	Ethiopia	3:41.14	Q
5	Kamal Boulahfane	Algeria	3:41.27	Q
6	Nick Willis	New Zealand	3:41.46	
7	Álvaro Fernández	Spain	3:42.01	
8	Juan Carlos Higuero	Spain	3:42.13	
9	Kevin Sullivan	Canada	3:42.86	
10	Youssef Baba	Morocco	3:42.96	
11	Johan Cronje	South Africa	3:44.41	
12	Michal Šneberger	Czech Republic	3:47.03	

=== Final ===
Rank	Athlete	Nation	Time
1st place, gold medalist(s)	Hicham El Guerrouj	Morocco	3:34.19
2nd place, silver medalist(s)	Bernard Lagat	Kenya	3:34.30
3rd place, bronze medalist(s)	Rui Silva	Portugal	3:34.68
4	Timothy Kiptanui	Kenya	3:35.61
5	Ivan Heshko	Ukraine	3:35.82
6	Michael East	Great Britain	3:36.33
7	Reyes Estévez	Spain	3:36.63
8	Gert-Jan Liefers	Netherlands	3:37.17
9	Adil Kaouch	Morocco	3:38.26
10	Mulugeta Wendimu	Ethiopia	3:38.33
11	Kamal Boulahfane	Algeria	3:39.02
12	Isaac Kiprono Songok	Kenya	3:41.72
