= Athletics at the 2003 Summer Universiade – Men's 1500 metres =

The men's 1500 metres event at the 2003 Summer Universiade was held in Daegu, South Korea on 26–28 August.

== Medalists ==
Gold	Silver	Bronze
Johan Pretorius; South Africa	Pedro Antonio Esteso; Spain	Fabiano Peçanha; Brazil

== Results ==
=== Heats ===
Rank	Heat	Athlete	Nationality	Time	Notes
1	2	Mark Fountain	Australia	3:45.07	Q
2	2	Pedro Antonio Esteso	Spain	3:45.55	Q
3	2	Dmitriy Onufriyenko	Russia	3:45.83	Q
4	2	Zbigniew Graczyk	Poland	3:45.96	Q
5	2	Mathieu Vandiest	Belgium	3:46.09	Q
6	2	Moulay Youssef Ismaili Alaoui	Morocco	3:46.25	q
7	2	Brian Murray	Ireland	3:47.53	q
8	1	Johan Pretorius	South Africa	3:47.86	Q
9	1	Roman Tarasov	Russia	3:47.95	Q
10	1	Aléxis Abraham	France	3:48.00	Q
11	1	Fabiano Peçanha	Brazil	3:48.17	Q
12	1	Mikhail Kolganov	Kazakhstan	3:48.32	Q
13	1	Fabio Lettieri	Italy	3:48.91	
14	1	Tonny Okello	Uganda	3:49.09	
15	1	Thomas Carter	Great Britain	3:50.90	
16	1	Peter Madsen	Denmark	3:53.25	
17	1	Max Smith	New Zealand	3:53.34	
18	1	Kondwani Chiwina	Malawi	3:54.36	
19	2	François Pretorius	South Africa	3:54.95	
20	1	Albert Khoza	Swaziland	3:59.84	
21	2	Aunese Mika	Samoa	4:00.77	NJR
22	2	Park Ji-yoon	South Korea	4:05.26	
23	1	Que Yin Tik	Hong Kong	4:06.13	
24	1	Iao Kuan Un	Macau	4:07.18	NR
25	2	Hamza Gomaa	Sudan	4:08.64	
26	2	Mohamed Al-Azri	Oman	4:10.72	
27	1	Khaled Al-Manji	Oman	4:12.75	
28	2	Omar Abdi Hamid Hassan	Somalia	4:15.10	
29	2	So Hoi Nam	Hong Kong	4:20.36	
30	2	Iao Chong Wa	Macau	4:37.49	
	2	Bayron Piedra	Ecuador	DNF	

=== Final ===
Rank	Athlete	Nationality	Time	Notes
1st place, gold medalist(s)	Johan Pretorius	South Africa	3:42.81	
2nd place, silver medalist(s)	Pedro Antonio Esteso	Spain	3:42.82	
3rd place, bronze medalist(s)	Fabiano Peçanha	Brazil	3:43.91	
4	Zbigniew Graczyk	Poland	3:44.01	
5	Mark Fountain	Australia	3:44.04	
6	Moulay Youssef Ismaili Alaoui	Morocco	3:44.12	
7	Mathieu Vandiest	Belgium	3:44.71	
8	Aléxis Abraham	France	3:44.93	
9	Brian Murray	Ireland	3:45.44	
10	Dmitriy Onufriyenko	Russia	3:45.44	
11	Roman Tarasov	Russia	3:48.51	
12	Mikhail Kolganov	Kazakhstan	3:48.56	
