= 2002 African Championships in Athletics – Men's 1500 metres =

The men's 1500 metres event at the 2002 African Championships in Athletics was held in Radès, Tunisia on August 6–7.

== Medalists ==
Gold	Silver	Bronze
Bernard Lagat; Kenya	Laban Rotich; Kenya	Abdelkader Hachlaf; Morocco

== Results ==
=== Heats ===
Rank	Heat	Name	Nationality	Time	Notes
1	1	Bernard Lagat	Kenya	3:45.43	Q
2	1	Abdelkader Hachlaf	Morocco	3:45.44	Q
3	1	Tarek Boukensa	Algeria	3:45.62	Q
4	1	Cornelius Chirchir	Kenya	3:45.75	Q
5	1	Habtai Kifletsion	Eritrea	3:47.74	Q
6	1	Mohamed Kanzari	Tunisia	3:48.24	q
7	1	Keenetse Moswasi	Botswana	3:53.79	q
8	2	Laban Rotich	Kenya	3:56.87	Q
9	2	Youssef Baba	Morocco	3:57.00	Q
10	2	Julius Achon	Uganda	3:57.04	Q
11	2	Mohamed Khaldi	Algeria	3:57.18	Q
12	2	Berhanu Alemu	Ethiopia	3:57.30	Q
13	2	Ibrahim Ofangobi	Benin	4:02.80	
14	2	Roland Natouyoulana	Republic of the Congo	4:10.61	
15	1	Sory Fofana	Guinea	4:12.58	
16	2	Mohamed Faisal	Somalia	4:16.59	
17	1	Abdulahi Yahye	Somalia	4:20.57	
	1	Mohamed Babiker	Sudan	DNS	
	2	Abdillahi Bouh Moumin	Djibouti	DNS	
	2	Arlindo Pinheiro	São Tomé and Príncipe	DNS	

=== Final ===
Rank	Name	Nationality	Time	Notes
1st place, gold medalist(s)	Bernard Lagat	Kenya	3:38.11	
2nd place, silver medalist(s)	Laban Rotich	Kenya	3:38.60	
3rd place, bronze medalist(s)	Abdelkader Hachlaf	Morocco	3:38.78	
4	Cornelius Chirchir	Kenya	3:39.67	
5	Tarek Boukensa	Algeria	3:41.49	
6	Julius Achon	Uganda	3:43.00	
7	Mohamed Khaldi	Algeria	3:43.46	
8	Berhanu Alemu	Ethiopia	3:44.23	
9	Youssef Baba	Morocco	3:48.20	
10	Habtai Kifletsion	Eritrea	3:48.31	
11	Mohamed Kanzari	Tunisia	3:48.77	
12	Keenetse Moswasi	Botswana	3:56.23	
