= Mirosław Formela =

Polish middle-distance runner (1978–2025)

Mirosław Formela (31 October 1978 – 21 May 2025) was a Polish middle distance runner. He finished 5th in the 1500 metres at the 2004 World Indoor Championships. Formela died on 21 May 2025, at the age of 46.

== Achievements ==
Year	Competition	Venue	Position	Event	Notes
Representing Poland
2003	World Indoor Championships	Birmingham, United Kingdom	6th (h)	1500 m	3:40.89
2004	World Indoor Championships	Budapest, Hungary	5th	1500 m	3:53.70
2005	European Indoor Championships	Madrid, Spain	10th (h)	1500 m	3:44.43
2006	European Championships	Gothenburg, Sweden	14th (sf)	800 m	1:49.70
2006	European Championships	Gothenburg, Sweden	10th	1500 m	3:43.16

== Personal bests ==
Outdoor

- 800 metres – 1:46.26 (Warsaw 2006)
- 1000 metres – 2:21.40 (Sondershausen 2002)
- 1500 metres – 3:38.60 (Lausanne 2004)

Indoor

- 800 metres – 1:47.76 (Spała 2004)
- 1000 metres – 2:21.51 (Fayetteville 2005)
- 1500 metres – 3:39.88 (Spała 2005)
