= Abdelkader Bakhtache =

French middle-distance runner

Personal information
- Born: 30 January 1982 Thonon-les-Bains, France
- Height: 1.70 m (5 ft 7 in)
- Weight: 58 kg (128 lb)

Sport
- Sport: Athletics
- Event: 1500 metres

Abdelkader Bakhtache (born 30 January 1982 in Thonon-les-Bains) is a retired French middle-distance runner who specialised in the 1500 metres. He represented his country at the 2010 World Indoor Championships without advancing from the first round. In addition, he finished fourth at the 2007 European Indoor Championships. Until 2006 he represented Algeria.

== International competitions ==
| Year | Competition | Venue | Position | Event | Notes |
Representing France
| 2006 | European Championships | Gothenburg, Sweden | 17th (h) | 1500 m | 3:48.09 |
| 2007 | European Indoor Championships | Birmingham, United Kingdom | 4th | 1500 m | 3:45.54 |
| 2009 | World Military Championships | Sofia, Bulgaria | 1st | 1500 m | 3:43.60 |
| 2009 | Mediterranean Games | Pescara, Italy | 8th | 1500 m | 3:43.14 |
| 2010 | World Indoor Championships | Doha, Qatar | 11th (h) | 1500 m | 3:40.49 |
| 2011 | Military World Games | Rio de Janeiro, Brazil | 11th | 1500 m | 3:49.55 |

== Personal bests ==
Outdoor

- 800 metres – 1:48.74 (La Roche-sur-Yon 2007)
- 1000 metres – 2:19.89 (Grenoble 2009)
- 1500 metres – 3:38.24 (Strasbourg 2007)
- 3000 metres – 8:10.79 (Vénissieux 2007)
- 5000 metres – 14:38.74 (Vénissieux 2015)
- 10 kilometres – 30:32 (Paris 2006)

Indoor

- 1500 metres – 3:38.32 (Liévin 2010)
