= Sergio Gallardo =

Spanish middle-distance runner

Personal information
- Born: 22 March 1979 (age 47)

Sport
- Sport: Track and field
Medal record
Representing Spain
European Indoor Championships
Silver medal – second place	2007 Birmingham	1500m
European U23 Championships
Bronze medal – third place	2001 Amsterdam	1500m

Sergio Gallardo Martínez (born 22 March 1979) is a Spanish middle distance runner. He specializes in the 1500 metres.

== Achievements ==
Year	Competition	Venue	Position	Event	Notes
Representing Spain
1998	World Junior Championships	Annecy, France	14th (h)	800 m	1:51.32
2000	Ibero-American Championships	Rio de Janeiro, Brazil	3rd	800 m	1:48.85
2001	European U23 Championships	Amsterdam, Netherlands	3rd	1500 m	3:39.50
2001	Universiade	Beijing, China	5th	1500 m	3:44.91
2002	European Indoor Championships	Vienna, Austria	12th (h)	1500 m	3:43.67
2002	Ibero-American Championships	Guatemala City, Guatemala	5th	800 m	1:47.73
2004	World Indoor Championships	Budapest, Hungary	5th	3000 m	7:58.96
2004	Ibero-American Championships	Huelva, Spain	1st	1500 m	3:37.34
2005	Mediterranean Games	Almería, Spain	4th	1500 m	3:45.95
2006	World Indoor Championships	Moscow, Russia	5th	1500 m	3:43.77
2006	European Championships	Gothenburg, Sweden	5th	1500 m	3:41.24
2007	European Indoor Championships	Birmingham, United Kingdom	2nd	1500 m	3:44.51
2007	World Championships	Osaka, Japan	12th	1500 m	3:37.03

=== Personal bests ===
- 800 metres - 1:48.12 min (2002)
- 1500 metres - 3:34.95 min (2006)
- Mile - 3:56.78 min (2003)
- 3000 metres - 7:48.27 min (2004)
