= Mehdi Baala =

French middle-distance runner

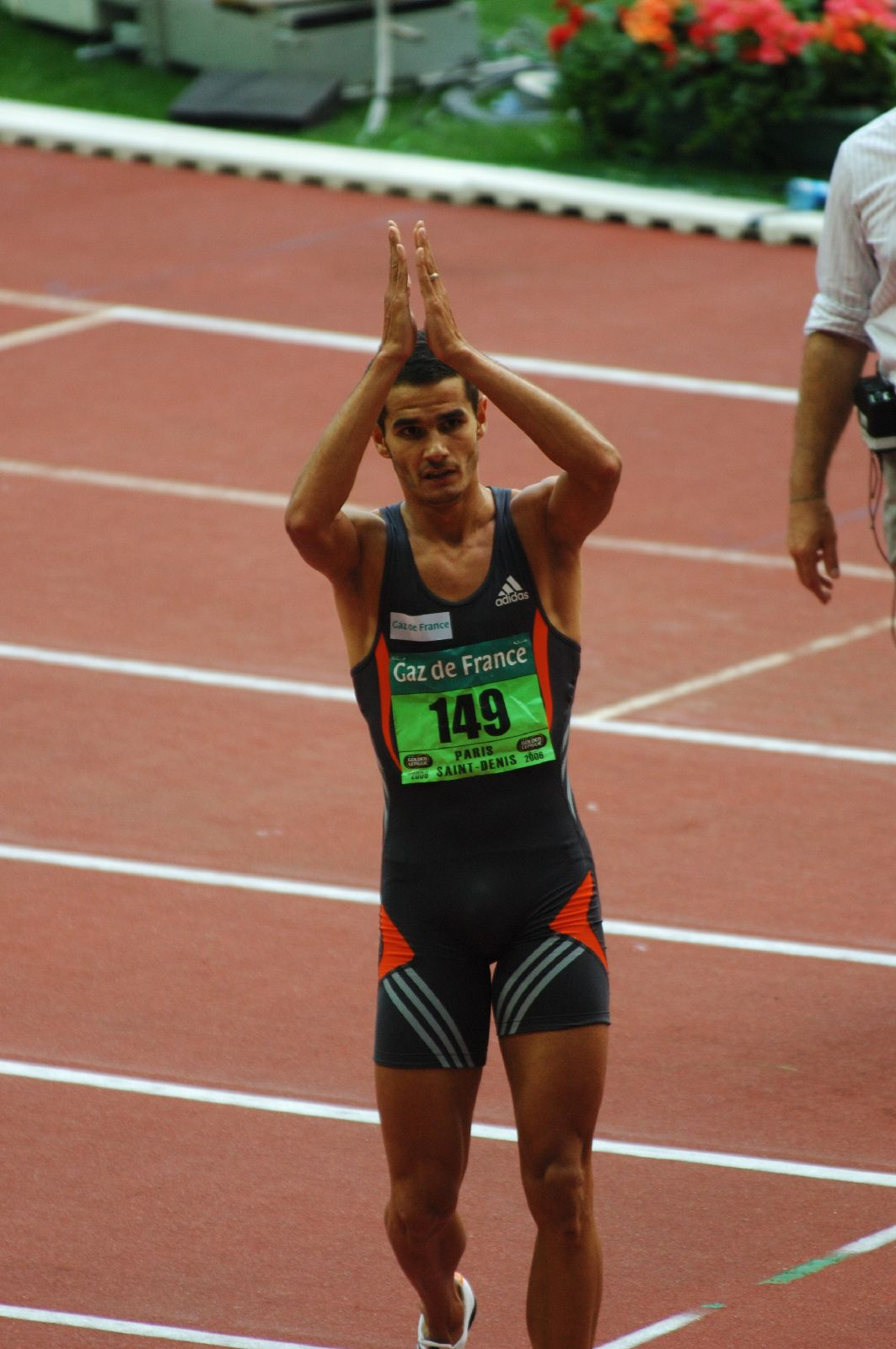

Personal information
- Nationality: French
- Born: 17 August 1978 (age 47) Strasbourg, France
- Height: 1.83 m (6 ft 0 in)
- Weight: 65 kg (143 lb)

Sport
- Sport: middle-distance running
Medal record
Men's athletics
Representing France
Olympic Games
Bronze medal – third place	2008 Beijing	1500 m
World Championships
Silver medal – second place	2003 Paris	1500 m
European Championships
Gold medal – first place	2002 Munich	1500 m
Gold medal – first place	2006 Gothenburg	1500 m
European Indoor Championships
Bronze medal – third place	2000 Ghent	1500 m

Mehdi Baala (Arabic: مهدي بعلة; born 17 August 1978 in Strasbourg) is a French former middle-distance runner competing mainly in the 1500 metres event. Baala has won several major international championships medals in the 1500 metres event – an Olympic Games bronze, a World Championships silver, two European Championships golds and a European Indoor Championships bronze. Moreover, he has won several medals in the 1500 metres event of the European Cup, IAAF World Cup and the IAAF World Athletics Final. Baala is considered to be one of the best French middle-distance runners of all time. As of February 2024, he holds French national outdoor records for three distances (1000m: 2.13.96, 1500m: 3.28.98 and 2000m: 4.53.12; all of these were set from 2002 to 2005) and French national indoor records for three distances (800m, 1000m and the mile; all of these were set from 2003 to 2009).

Baala won the silver medal at the 2003 World Championships in the 1500 metres event. At the 2007 World Championships in Osaka in 2007, he finished first in his 1500 metres semi-final heat but was disqualified for causing the fall of two other athletes.

Baala finished fourth in the 1500 metres final at the 2000 Olympics. At the 2008 Olympics, Baala won the bronze medal for the 1500 metres event. He had initially finished in fourth place in the final once again, but the initial winner Rashid Ramzi was stripped of his gold medal when he was found guilty of doping and hence Baala was elevated to receive the bronze medal.

On 22 July 2011, immediately after the 1500m race of the Monaco meeting of the IAAF Diamond League, Baala and his fellow competitor and compatriot Mahiedine Mekhissi-Benabbad traded blows on the track. The French Athletics Federation handed Baala and Mekhissi-Benabbad a suspension of 10 months each – 5 months suspended – from all European Athletics and IAAF track meets. Both were each fined 1500 euros and ordered to perform 50 hours of community service. Baala and Mekhissi-Benabbad were nevertheless cleared to take part in the upcoming 2011 World Championships

== Results in international competitions ==
Note: Only the position and time in the final are indicated, unless otherwise stated; if the athlete did not qualify for the final, the overall position and time in the first round heats or semifinals are indicated.

Year	Competition	Venue	Position	Event	Notes
Representing France
1996	World Junior Championships	Sydney, Australia	33rd (1st round heats)	1500 m	4:21.48
1997	European Junior Championships	Ljubljana, Slovenia	7th	1500 m	3:49.51
1999	European U23 Championships	Gothenburg, Sweden	3rd	1500 m	3:45.41
2000	European Indoor Championships	Ghent, Belgium	3rd	1500 m	3:42.27
2000	Olympic Games	Sydney, Australia	4th	1500 m	3:34.14
2000	European Cup	Gateshead, England	1st	1500 m	3:41.75
2000	European Cup	Gateshead, England	1st	800 m	1:47.90
2001	World Championships	Edmonton, Canada	12th	1500 m	3:55.36
2001	European Cup	Bremen, Germany	2nd	1500 m	3:46.29
2002	European Championships	Munich, Germany	1st	1500 m	3:45.25
2002	European Cup	Annecy, France	1st	1500 m	3:47.21
2002	IAAF World Cup	Madrid, Spain	3rd	1500 m	3:38.04
2003	World Championships	Paris, France	2nd	1500 m	3:32.31
2004	Olympic Games	Athens, Greece	30th (1st round heats)	1500 m	3:46.06 (1st round heats)
2004	European Cup	Bydgoszcz, Poland	1st	1500 m	3:49.13
2005	World Championships	Helsinki, Finland	6th	800 m	1:45.32
2005	World Championships	Helsinki, Finland	19th (semifinals)	1500 m	3:41.34 (semifinals)
2006	European Championships	Gothenburg, Sweden	1st	1500 m	3:39.02
2006	European Championships	Gothenburg, Sweden	1st round heat – DNS	800 m	DNS
2007	European Cup	Munich, Germany	1st	1500 m	3:47.36
2007	IAAF World Athletics Final	Stuttgart, Germany	2nd	1500 m	3:38.35
2007	World Championships	Osaka, Japan	DQ (semifinals)	1500 m	DQ
2008	European Cup	Annecy, France	1st	1500 m	3:40.55
2008	Olympic Games	Beijing, China	3rd	1500 m	3:34.21
2009	World Championships	Berlin, Germany	7th	1500 m	3:36.99
2011	World Championships	Daegu, South Korea	9th	1500 m	3:37.46
