= Pedro Antonio Esteso =

Spanish middle-distance runner

Personal information
- Born: 13 October 1976 (age 50) Minaya, Spain

Sport
- Sport: Track and field
Medal record
Representing Spain
Summer Universiade
Gold medal – first place	2001 Beijing	1500m
Silver medal – second place	2003 Daegu	1500m

Pedro Antonio Esteso Herrera (born 13 October 1976) is a Spanish athlete specialising in the middle-distance events. He won two medals at Summer Universiades, in 2001 and 2003.

As of 2013 he was still active in masters athletics.

== Competition record ==
Year	Competition	Venue	Position	Event	Notes
Representing Spain
1997	European U23 Championships	Turku, Finland	19th (h)	800 m	1:52.89
1997	Mediterranean Games	Bari, Italy	8th	800 m	1:48.62
1997	Universiade	Catania, Italy	34th (h)	1500 m	3:56.00
1998	European Indoor Championships	Valencia, Spain	16th (sf)	800 m	1:50.96
1998	Ibero-American Championships	Lisbon, Portugal	2nd	1500 m	3:40.64
2000	European Indoor Championships	Ghent, Belgium	16th (h)	1500 m	3:48.94
2001	Universiade	Beijing, China	1st	1500 m	3:43.98
2001	Mediterranean Games	Radès, Tunisia	8th	1500 m	3:51.86
2002	European Indoor Championships	Vienna, Austria	14th (h)	1500 m	3:44.32
2003	Universiade	Daegu, South Korea	2nd	1500 m	3:42.82
2008	Ibero-American Championships	Iquique, Chile	6th	1500 m	3:44.06

== Personal bests ==
Outdoor

- 800 metres – 1:47.30 (Madrid 2002)
- 1000 metres – 2:18.90 (Andújar 2006)
- 1500 metres – 3:36.71 (Zagreb 2002)

Indoor

- 800 metres – 1:49.63 (Valencia 1998)
- 1500 metres – 3:41.80 (Espinho 2000)
