= Tarek Boukensa =

Algerian runner (born 1981)

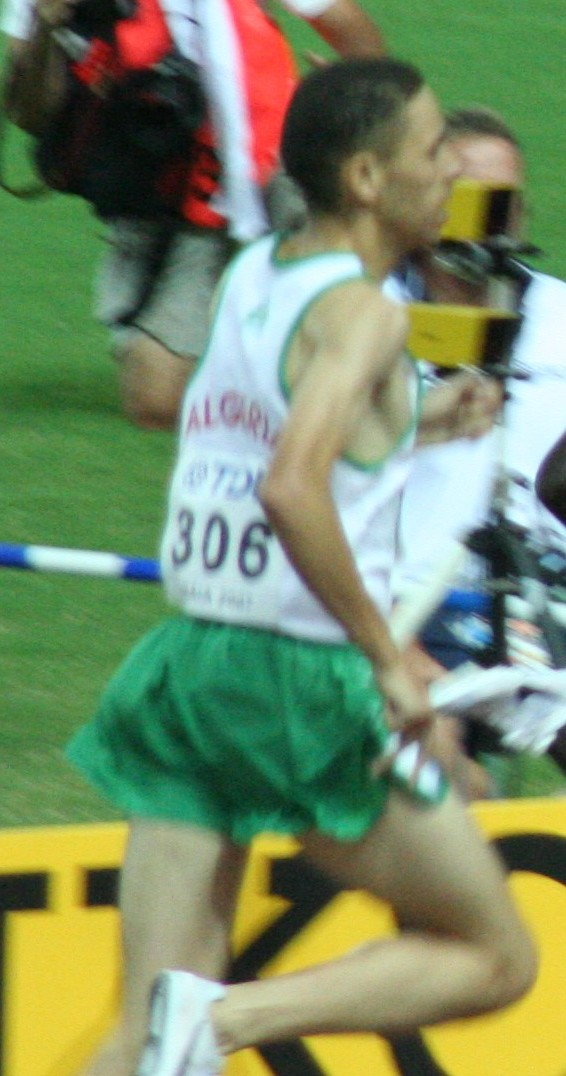
- Tarek Boukensa in 2007

Medal record

Men's athletics

Representing Algeria

African Championships
Bronze medal – third place	2006 Bambous	1500 m

Tarek Boukensa (Arabic: طارق بوكنسة) (born 19 November 1981 in Annaba) is an Algerian runner, who specializes in the 1500 metres.

== Competition record ==
Year	Competition	Venue	Position	Event	Notes
Representing Algeria
2000	World Junior Championships	Santiago, Chile	8th	1500 m	3:44.46
2001	Mediterranean Games	Radès, Tunisia	6th	1500 m	3:49.78
2002	African Championships	Radès, Tunisia	5th	1500 m	3:41.49
2003	World Indoor Championships	Birmingham, United Kingdom	12th (h)	1500 m	3:42.88
2003	World Championships	Paris, France	15th (sf)	1500 m	3:41.33
2003	Military World Games	Catania, Italy	3rd	1500 m	3:56.47
2004	Olympic Games	Athens, Greece	6th (h)	1500 m	3:37.94
2005	Islamic Solidarity Games	Mecca, Saudi Arabia	1st	1500 m	3:47.01
2005	Mediterranean Games	Almería, Spain	5th	1500 m	3:46.04
2005	World Championships	Helsinki, Finland	8th	1500 m	3:41.01
2006	African Championships	Bambous, Mauritius	3rd	1500 m	3:46.81
2006	World Athletics Final	Stuttgart, Germany	5th	1500 m	3:33.87
2007	All-Africa Games	Algiers, Algeria	3rd	1500 m	3:39.18
2007	World Championships	Osaka, Japan	5th	1500 m	3:35.26
2008	Olympic Games	Beijing, China	16th (sf)	1500 m	3:39.73
2009	World Championships	Berlin, Germany	38th (h)	1500 m	3:45.65
2011	World Championships	Daegu, South Korea	11th	1500 m	3:38.05

=== Personal bests ===
- 800 metres – 1:46.10 min (2006)
- 1500 metres – 3:30.92 min (2007)
- 3000 metres – 7:43.23 min (2005)
