= Mykola Labovskyi =

Ukrainian middle-distance runner

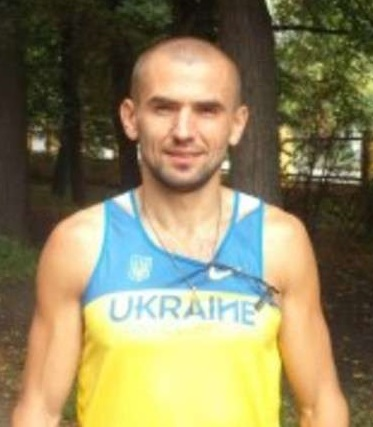
A portrait of Mykola Labovskyy

Mykola Labovskyi, sometimes Mykola Labovskyy (Ukrainian: Микола Лабовський; born 4 May 1983) is a Ukrainian middle distance runner.

== Achievements ==
Year	Competition	Venue	Position	Event	Notes
Representing Ukraine
2006	European Championships	Gothenburg, Sweden	11th	1500 m	3:43.47
2010	European Team Championships	Bergen, Norway	2nd	3000 m	8:20.01
2011	European Indoor Championships	Paris, France	18th (h)	3000 m	8:08.17
2011	European Team Championships	Stockholm, Sweden	6th	3000 m	8:05.17
2012	European Championships	Helsinki, Finland	DNF	10.000 m	-
2012	Olympic Games	London, Great Britain	26th	10.000 m	29:32.12
