= James Thie =

Welsh middle-distance runner

James Thie (born 27 June 1978) is a Welsh middle-distance runner specialising in the 1500 metres. He finished fourth at the 2004 World Indoor Championships.

== Competition record ==
| Year | Competition | Venue | Position | Event | Notes |
Representing Great Britain and Wales
| 2003 | World Indoor Championships | Birmingham, United Kingdom | 8th (h) | 1500 m | 3:41.18 |
| 2004 | World Indoor Championships | Budapest, Hungary | 4th | 1500 m | 3:53.36 |
| 2005 | European Indoor Championships | Madrid, Spain | 6th | 1500 m | 3:40.76 |
| 2006 | Commonwealth Games | Melbourne, Australia | 17th (h) | 1500 m | 3:47.88 |
| 2007 | European Indoor Championships | Birmingham, United Kingdom | 9th | 1500 m | 3:47.00 |
| 2010 | Commonwealth Games | Delhi, India | 9th | 1500 m | 3:44.25 |
| 2019 | World Masters Indoor Athletics Championships | Torun, Poland | 1st, M40 | 1500 m | 4:07.33 |
| 2024 | World Masters Athletics Championships | Gothenburg, Sweden | 3rd, M45 | 1500 m | 4:11.09 |

== Personal best ==
Outdoor

- 1500 metres – 3:37.06 (Iráklio 2004)
- One mile – 3:57.86 (London 2004)
- 2000 metres – 5:12.90 (Merksem 2004)
- 3000 metres – 8:04.67 (Berlin 2006)

Indoor

- 800 metres – 1:49.87 (Manchester 2003)
- 1500 metres – 3:38.69 (Birmingham 2004)
- One mile – 3:57.71 (New York 2003)
- 2000 metres – 5:13.97 (Birmingham 1999)
- 3000 metres – 7:56.22 (Glasgow 2006)
