= James Li =

Chinese-born American athletics coach

James Li (born c. 1961) is a Chinese-American athletics coach at the University of Arizona. His teams have won 12 national championships. He is known for his work with international runners, including from Kenya and Sudan. Successful runners he has coached include Stephen Sambu, Lawi Lalang, and Bernard Lagat. Li has been at Arizona for 15 years as of 2018. Before that he spent 13 years at Washington State University. As of 2021 Li has retired from his position as coach at Arizona. He is currently the Head Coach for E-House Marathon Club in Shanghai, China.

Li was born in Chengdu, Sichuan province, China. He was a middle-distance runner at the Beijing Institute of Physical Education, winning the Chinese Collegiate 800-meter title in 1979. After earning his bachelor's degree in 1982, Li began his coaching career at Sichuan Sports Technique Institute and was a provincial team coach for men's middle and distance runners in Sichuan Province from 1983 to 1985.

Li moved to the United States and received a master's degree in biomechanics from Washington State University in 1987 and a doctorate in educational athletic administration in 1993. He became a naturalized U.S. citizen in 1998.

At the 2008 Olympic Games in Beijing, Li served as manager for the American men's track team.
