= Track and field at the 2011 Military World Games – Men's 1500 metres =

The men's 1500 metres event at the 2011 Military World Games was held on 21 and 22 and 23 July at the Estádio Olímpico João Havelange.

== Records ==
Prior to this competition, the existing world and CISM record were as follows:

World Record	Hicham El Guerrouj (MAR)	3:26.00	Rome, Italy	14 July 1998
CISM World Record	Mohamed Suleiman (QAT)	3:34.82	Tours, France	August 1993

== Schedule ==
Date	Time	Round
21 July 2011		Round 1
22 July 2011		Semifinals
23 July 2011	09:50	Final

== Medalists ==
Gold	Silver	Bronze
Gideon Gathimba; Kenya	Mohamed Moustaoui; Morocco	Imad Touil; Algeria

== Results ==
=== Final ===
Rank	Name	Nationality	Time	Notes
1st place, gold medalist(s)	Gideon Gathimba	Kenya	3:40.62	
2nd place, silver medalist(s)	Mohamed Moustaoui	Morocco	3:41.04	
3rd place, bronze medalist(s)	Imad Touil	Algeria	3:41.24	
4	Yoann Kowal	France	3:41.50	
5	Bartosz Nowicki	Poland	3:44.32	
6	Ghirmay Weldeyowhans	Eritrea	3:44.81	
7	Alemu Gebre	Bahrain	3:45.80	
8	Chaminda Indika Wijekoon	Sri Lanka	3:47.33	
9	Dotto Ikangaa	Tanzania	3:48.54	
10	Mohammed Hajjaj	Morocco	3:49.49	
11	Abdelkader Bakhtache	France	3:49.55	
12	Alan O'Brien	Ireland	3:52.77	
