= Jason Lunn =

American middle-distance runner (born 1974)

Jason Lunn (born September 19, 1974) is an American retired middle-distance runner who mostly competed in the 1500 meters. He was born in Boulder, Colorado.

Lunn was the US outdoor champion at 1500m in 2003. He represented his country at one outdoor and three indoor World Championships. He earned All-American honors for Stanford University in cross country in 1997, and multiple times for the Stanford Cardinal track and field team. He is now an assistant professor at Penn State University.

== Competition record ==
Year	Competition	Venue	Position	Event	Notes
Representing the United States
2001	World Indoor Championships	Lisbon, Portugal	10th (h)	1500 m	3:40.42
2003	World Indoor Championships	Birmingham, United Kingdom	13th (h)	1500 m	3:43.31
2003	World Championships	Paris, France	17th (sf)	1500 m	3:41.71
2006	World Indoor Championships	Moscow, Russia	17th (h)	1500 m	3:46.46

== Personal bests ==
Outdoor

- 800 meters – 1:47.78 (Switzerland 2002)
- 1500 meters – 3:36.38 (Iráklio 2004)
- Mile run – 3:54.43 (Eugene 2003)

Indoor

- 1500 meters – 3:40.42 (Lisbon 2001)
- One mile – 3:55.49 (Fayetteville 2003)
- 3000 meters – 7:47.20 (Boston 2004)
