= Fouad Chouki =

French middle-distance runner

Fouad Chouki (born 15 October 1978 in Strasbourg) is a French middle distance runner who specializes in the 1500 metres.

He won a bronze medal at the 2001 Mediterranean Games in Tunis and finished fourth at the 2002 European Championships in Munich. He then reached the final at the 2003 World Championships in Paris, but was disqualified as he tested positive for erythropoietin. The IAAF handed him a suspension from September 2003 to September 2005. Chouki's claims the substance was injected into his body by an unknown individual led the French Athletics Federation to cut his ban by six months. However, the claim was rejected by the Court of Arbitration for Sport.

His personal best time is 3:30.83 minutes, achieved in August 2003 in Zürich.

== See also ==
- List of sportspeople sanctioned for doping offences
