= Valery Pisarev =

Kyrgyzstani long-distance runner

Personal information
- Nationality: Kyrgyzstani
- Born: 30 June 1979 (age 47)

Sport
- Sport: Long-distance running
- Event: Marathon

Valery Pisarev (born 30 June 1979) is a Kyrgyzstani former long-distance runner. He competed in the men's marathon at the 2004 Summer Olympics.
