= Cornelius Chirchir =

Kenyan runner

Cornelius Chirchir (born 5 June 1983 in Bomet) is a Kenyan runner who specializes in the 1500 metres. He holds the world junior record over the distance with 3:30.24 minutes, achieved on 19 July 2002 in Monte Carlo. He came close to the record in 2004 with 3:30.60 min, but never since.

He is based at the PACE Sports Management camp in Kaptagat.

== Achievements ==
Year	Competition	Venue	Position	Event	Notes
Representing Kenya
1999	World Youth Championships	Bydgoszcz, Poland	1st	1500m	3:44.02
2000	World Junior Championships	Santiago, Chile	1st	1500m	3:38.80
2002	African Championships	Radès, Tunisia	4th	1500m	3:39.67
2002	IAAF Grand Prix Final	Paris, France	3rd	1500m	3:31.51
2003	World Indoor Championships	Birmingham, England	4th	1500m	3:43.03
2003	World Athletics Final	Monte Carlo, Monaco	6th	1500m	3:41.77

=== Personal bests ===
- 800 metres – 1:44.98 min (2001)
- 1500 metres – 3:30.24 min (2002)
- One mile – 3:50.40 min (2003)
