= Álvaro Fernández (athlete) =

Spanish middle-distance runner

Personal information
- Nationality: Spanish
- Born: 7 April 1981 (age 45)

Sport
- Sport: Middle-distance running
- Event: 1500 metres

Álvaro Fernández (born 7 April 1981) is a Spanish middle-distance runner. He competed in the men's 1500 metres at the 2004 Summer Olympics.
