= Kakiptui =

Village in Nandi County, Kenya

Kakiptui (also spelled as Kakiptoi) is a village near Kabiyet in Nandi County, Kenya.

Kakiptui is part of Kipkaren location of Kipkaren division of Nandi County. Its local authority is Nandi County Council and constituency is Mosop.

There is another village named Kakiptui in Kericho County.
