= Gareth Turnbull =

Irish middle-distance runner

Personal information
- Nationality: Irish
- Born: 14 May 1979 (age 47) Belfast, Northern Ireland

Sport
- Sport: Athletics
- Event: Middle-distance running
Medal record
Men's Athletics
Representing Ireland
Summer Universiade
Silver medal – second place	2001 Beijing	1500 metres

Gareth Turnbull (born 14 May 1979) is an Irish middle distance runner who specialises in the 1500 metres. He won the silver medal at the 2001 Summer Universiade.

== Competition record ==
Year	Competition	Venue	Position	Event	Notes
Representing Ireland
1997	European Junior Championships	Ljubljana, Slovenia	3rd	1500 m	3:48.16
1999	Universiade	Palma de Mallorca, Spain	7th	1500 m	3:44.23
1999	European U23 Championships	Gothenburg, Sweden	7th	1500 m	3:46.79
2000	European Indoor Championships	Ghent, Belgium	11th (h)	1500 m	3:42.97
2001	European U23 Championships	Amsterdam, Netherlands	9th	1500 m	3:42.78
2001	Universiade	Beijing, China	2nd	1500 m	3:44.21
2003	World Championships	Paris, France	19th (sf)	1500 m	3:42.01
2007	European Indoor Championships	Birmingham, United Kingdom	21st (h)	1500 m	3:52.20

== Personal bests ==
Outdoor

- 800 metres – 1:47.96 (2002
- 1500 metres – 3:36.60 (Cuxhaven 2003)
- One mile – 3:57.61 (Philadelphia 2002)
- 10,000 metres – 30:09.66 (Gateshead 2004)

Indoor

- 1500 metres – 3:42.97 (Ghent 2000)
- One mile – 3:58.88 (New York 2007)
- 3000 metres – 8:00.63 (Gainesville 2006)
