= Bernard Lagat =

Kenyan-American runner

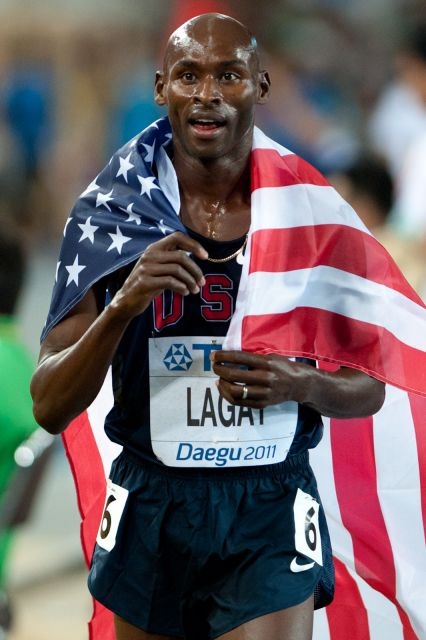
- Lagat in 2011

Personal information
- Full name: Bernard Kipchirchir Lagat
- Nationality: American
- Born: December 12, 1974 (age 51) Kapsabet, Kenya
- Height: 175 cm (5 ft 9 in)
- Weight: 59 kg (130 lb)

Sport
- Country: United States; Kenya
- Sport: Athletics/Track, Long-distance running
- Event: 800 m – Marathon
- College team: Washington State Cougars
- Club: Nike
- Turned pro: 1998
- Coached by: James Li

Achievements and titles
- Olympic finals: 2000 Sydney; 1500 m, Bronze; 2004 Athens; 1500 m, Silver; 2008 Beijing; 1500 m, 12th 5000 m, 9th 2012 London; 5000 m, 4th 2016 Rio de Janeiro; 5000 m, 5th
- World finals: 2001 Edmonton; 1500 m, Silver; 2007 Osaka; 1500 m, Gold; 5000 m, Gold; 2009 Berlin; 1500 m, Bronze; 5000 m, Silver; 2011 Daegu; 5000 m, Silver; 2013 Moscow; 5000 m, 6th
- Personal bests: 800 m: 1:46.00 (Berlin 2003); 1000 m: 2:16.18 (Gateshead 2008); 1500 m: 3:26.34 NR (Brussels 2001); One Mile: 3:47.28 (Rome 2001); 3000 m: 7:29.00 (Rieti 2010); 5000 m: 12:53.60 (Monaco 2011); 10,000 m: 27:49.35 MWR (Palo Alto 2016); 10 km: 27:48 MWR (Manchester 2015); Half marathon: 62:00 MAR (Houston 2018); Marathon: 2:12:10 (Gold Coast 2019)
Medal record
Men's athletics
Event	1st	2nd	3rd
Olympic Games	0	1	1
World Championships	2	3	1
World Indoor Championships	3	2	0
Continental Cup	2	0	1
Universiade	1	0	0
Total	8	5	3
Representing Kenya
Olympic Games
Silver medal – second place	2004 Athens	1500 m
Bronze medal – third place	2000 Sydney	1500 m
World Championships
Silver medal – second place	2001 Edmonton	1500 m
World Indoor Championships
Silver medal – second place	2003 Birmingham	1500 m
Gold medal – first place	2004 Budapest	3000 m
World Cup
Gold medal – first place	2002 Madrid	1500 m
African Championships
Gold medal – first place	2002 Radès	1500 m
Summer Universiade
Gold medal – first place	1999 Palma de Mallorca	1500 m
Representing United States
World Championships
Gold medal – first place	2007 Osaka	1500 m
Gold medal – first place	2007 Osaka	5000 m
Silver medal – second place	2009 Berlin	5000 m
Silver medal – second place	2011 Daegu	5000 m
Bronze medal – third place	2009 Berlin	1500 m
World Indoor Championships
Gold medal – first place	2010 Doha	3000 m
Gold medal – first place	2012 Istanbul	3000 m
Silver medal – second place	2014 Sopot	3000 m
World Cup
Gold medal – first place	2010 Split	3000 m
Gold medal – first place	2010 Split	5000 m
Bronze medal – third place	2014 Marrakesh	3000 m

Bernard Kipchirchir Lagat (born December 12, 1974) is a Kenyan-American former middle and long-distance runner.

Lagat was born in Kapsabet, Kenya. Prior to his change of domicile to the US, Lagat had an extensive competitive career representing his native country.

With his personal best of 3:26.34, Lagat is the Kenyan record holder at 1500 m outdoors, and is the second fastest 1500 m runner of all time, behind Hicham El Guerrouj. After becoming an American citizen, he broke American records in several events, including the 1500 m, mile, 3000 m, and 5000 m.

Lagat is a five-time Olympian, having competed in the 2000, 2004, 2008, 2012 and 2016 games, and is a thirteen-time medalist in World Championships and Olympics including five gold medals. At the age of 41, he finished 5th in the finals of the 5000 m at the Olympics in Rio de Janeiro.

Lagat's long-term coach is James Li of the University of Arizona, with whom he has worked for over a decade. Today, Lagat is the head cross country coach and an assistant track and field coach at the University of Arizona.

== Early life ==
Lagat was born in Kaptel village, near Kapsabet town in Nandi District of Kenya. He is a Nandi, a sub-tribe of the Kalenjin people.

He graduated from the Kaptel High School in 1994, where he had started his athletic career. He joined Jomo Kenyatta University of Agriculture and Technology in Nairobi 1996. Later in the same year, he moved to Washington State University where other Kenyan athletic greats such as Henry Rono and Michael Kosgei prospered.

In 1998, while at WSU, Lagat won three NCAA individual championships; indoor mile and 3000 m, as well as the 5000 m outdoors.

In 2000, Lagat graduated from Washington State University with a degree in management information systems.

Lagat's siblings have also competed in athletics; his older sister Mary Chepkemboi won the 3000 m at the 1984 African Championships in Athletics, his younger sister Viola Cheptoo placed second in the 2021 New York City Marathon.

== Representing Kenya (2000–2004) ==
Lagat first represented his native Kenya at the 2000 Summer Olympics in Sydney, Australia. In the 1500 m final, Morocco used team tactics to try to ensure a gold medal for heavy favorite Hicham El Guerrouj. In a very close finish, Noah Ngeny took gold, El Guerrouj won silver, and Lagat captured bronze. Lagat finished the year being ranked #3 in the world at 1500 m.

The next summer, Lagat won the silver medal, behind El Guerrouj, at the 2001 World Championships in Athletics, and later that summer, at a meet in Brussels, Lagat set the Kenyan National Record and became the second fastest individual ever at 1500 m when he ran 3:26.34, finishing second in this race behind Hicham El Guerrouj (3:26.13), in an attempt to break El Guerrouj's world record of 3:26.00. Lagat finished the year ranked #2 in the world at 1500 m.

Lagat spent most of 2002 and 2003 chasing El Guerrouj. At the 2003 IAAF World Indoor Championships, he earned the silver medal at 1500 m, this time behind Driss Maazouzi of France. Lagat withdrew from the 2003 world outdoor championships after a blood test showed traces of EPO in his system. His B sample test came back negative, clearing him of any charges. He was ranked 2nd and 4th in the world at 1500 m in 2002 and 2003 respectively.

In the 3000 m at the 2004 IAAF World Indoor Championships Lagat won his first international gold medal. Lagat was clearly overjoyed at his comeback since 2003. Throughout the spring he competed fiercely and beat his rival El Guerrouj in Zürich with a world leading time at 1500 m of 3:27.40. At the 2004 Summer Olympics Lagat seemed poised to once again defeat El Guerrouj. The final saw Lagat and El Guerrouj battling down the final 100 m, swapping the lead multiple times. El Guerrouj prevailed, with Lagat close behind, earning the silver medal, running the final lap in under 52 seconds. He was, however, ranked #1 in the world at 1500 m for the year.

== Representing the United States (2005–present) ==
=== Beginning of American career ===
In March 2005, Lagat announced that he had become a naturalized citizen of the United States on May 7, 2004. Lagat did compete for his homeland Kenya in the 2004 Summer Olympics, winning silver in the 1500 m. Even though Kenya did not allow dual citizenship at the time, he was allowed to keep his medal. Lagat became a competitor for the United States but was temporarily ineligible to compete in international championship events, missing the IAAF World Championships in Helsinki.

The U.S. does allow dual citizenship and consequently races run by Lagat after May 7, 2004, could have been ratified as American records, since USATF rules only state that an athlete has to be a U.S. citizen competing in a sanctioned competition to be eligible to set a national record. His 3:27.40 win in the 1500 meters, on August 6, 2004, in Zürich, was ratified as an American record in 2018, but not an area record by the NACAC.

Nevertheless, Lagat owns three American records from races he had run in 2005 that were ratified by USATF. His first American records came indoors, with a 3:49.89 mile at Fayetteville, Arkansas, on February 11, 2005, during which his 1500 meters split time of 3:33.34 also established another new U.S. record, en route to a win in the event. The performance replaced records by Steve Scott, who set the previous American indoor mile record of 3:51.8 in 1981, and the previous American 1500 meter indoor record held by Jeff Atkinson, who ran 3:38.12 in 1989. Lagat's winning time of 3:29.40 at Rieti, Italy, on August 28, 2005, in the outdoor 1500 meters was ratified as his third new American record, improving upon the old record of 3:29.77, set by Sydney Maree in 1985.

=== Double world champion ===
At the 2007 World Championships in Osaka, Lagat surpassed all his previous achievements by becoming the first athlete to become world champion in both the 1,500 m and 5,000 m at the same IAAF World Outdoor Championships. Similar feats were accomplished by Hicham El Guerrouj at the 2004 Olympics and Paavo Nurmi at the 1924 Olympics.

=== 2008 Olympics and 2009 Worlds ===
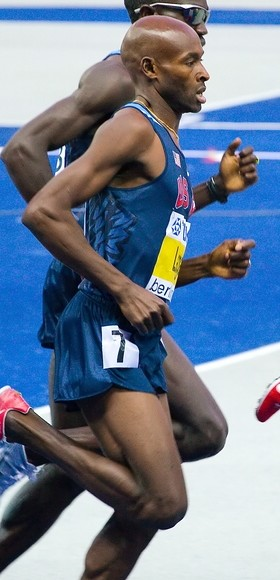
Bernard Lagat at the 2009 World Championships

In 2008, Lagat won both 1500 m and 5000 m runs at the US Olympic Trials in Eugene, Oregon, qualifying himself to compete with Team USA at the 2008 Summer Olympics in Beijing, China. Hopes were high that his success in both these events would continue at the Olympics. However, Lagat failed to advance beyond the semi-finals in the 1500 m run. He was more successful in the 5000 m run, winning his semi-final heat to advance, but ultimately did not medal, running to ninth-place finish in the finals.

Lagat had concealed the fact that he was running with an injured Achilles tendon, a problem which hampered his training and contributed to his poor showing at the Olympics. He stated that his placings at the 2008 Beijing Games were "the biggest disappointment in my athletics career". The following season, he began with high altitude training in Flagstaff, Arizona. After tying Eamonn Coghlan's record of seven wins in the Wanamaker Mile at the 2009 Millrose Games in New York, Lagat broke Coghlan's record with an 8th win at Millrose in 2010. As the reigning world champion in the 1500 and 5000 meters, he automatically received qualification in the events at the 2009 World Championships in Athletics and set his sights on retaining his titles. Despite being much older than some of his competitors, Lagat's desire to win had not faded and he said "I am more motivated than ever to go to the podium in Berlin". Lagat ultimately won the bronze medal in the 1500 m and the silver medal in the 5000 m.

=== 2010 to present ===
Lagat set a new American record in his debut of the indoor 5000 meters at the Reebok Boston Indoor Games on February 6, 2010, with a time of 13:11.50. This beat previous record holder Galen Rupp who had set the record at 13:18.12 in 2009. On June 4, 2010, Lagat broke the American Record for 5000 m with 12:54.12 on June 4, 2010, at the Bislett Games in Oslo. Lagat set another area record at the Rieti IAAF Grand Prix in August: chasing down Tariku Bekele in the 3000 m. Lagat took second place with an American record of 7:29.00 – his first sub-7:30 minute time.

Lagat broke his own 5000 m American record in July at the Monaco Diamond League meet by running 12:53.60 to finish a close second behind Mo Farah who set the British 5000 m record in this race in a time of 12:53.11. The 2011 World Championships in Athletics, the 5000 m final came down to a sprint finish and Lagat was beaten in the last straight by Mo Farah, leaving Lagat with his second consecutive silver medal at the world event.

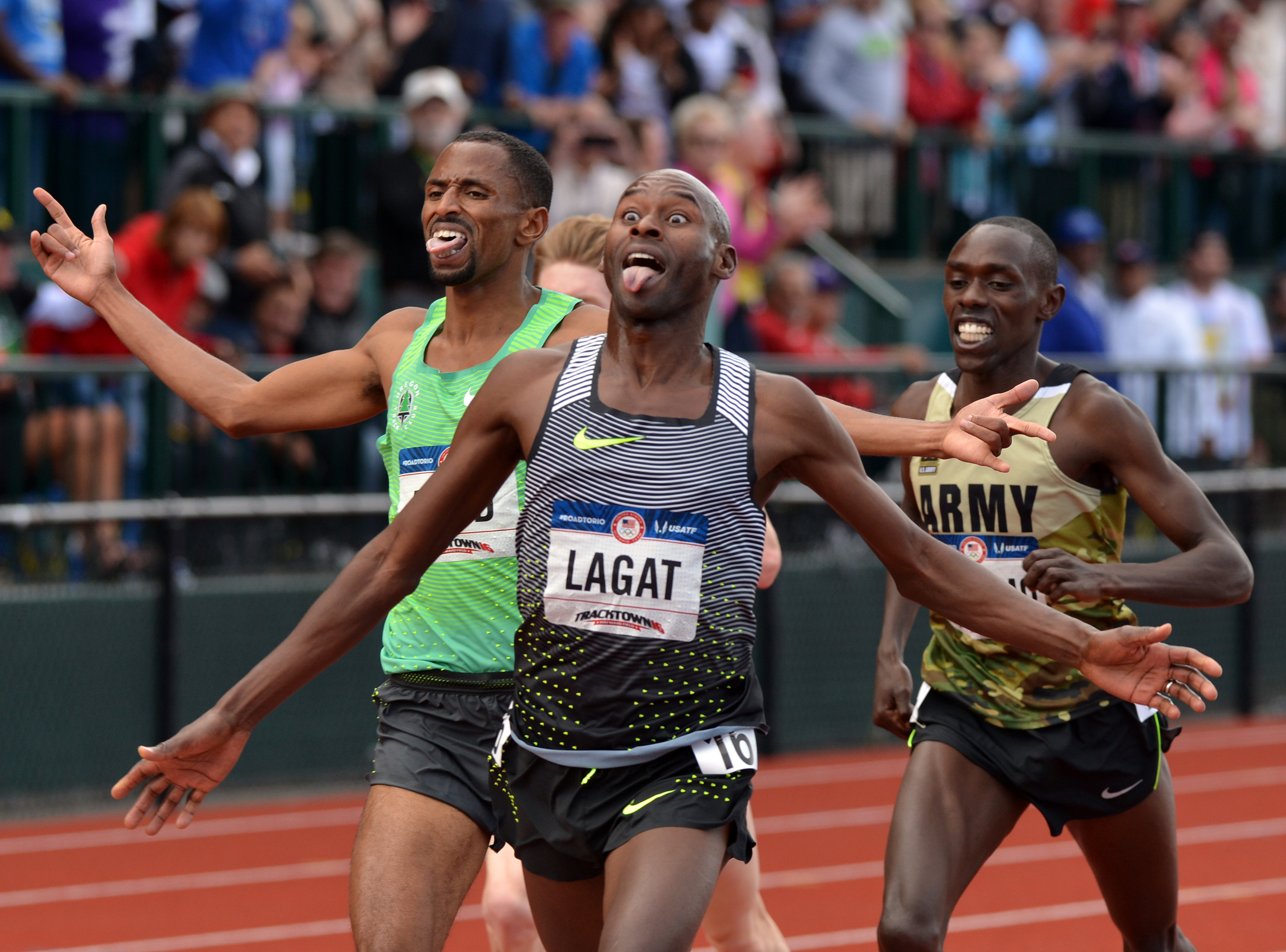
Lagat (center) winning the 5000 m race at the 2016 Olympic Trials

The 2012 Millrose Games, was held for the first time at the Armory Track & Field Center and Lagat ran an American indoor record over 5000 m with a time of 13:07.15 minutes. At the 2012 Olympics in London, Lagat finished fourth in the 5000 m race, crossing the line 1.33 seconds behind the leader, Mo Farah, after being tripped up when he was going into his kick by Isiah Kiplangat Koech. Lagat was runner-up behind Matthew Centrowitz Jr. at the Fifth Avenue Mile that year. Lagat earned his 4th USATF Indoor 3000 meters title on February 22, 2014 On June 27, Lagat, at age 39, won his seventh USA men's 5,000 title.

He made his debut at the 10,000 m on 1 May 2016 and came in first. His winning time of 27:49 seconds made an improvement for the world record in the Masters A40 category by 51 seconds. On July 9, Lagat won the 5000 meters at the 2016 United States Olympic Trials, qualifying him for his fifth Olympic Games in Rio de Janeiro. He entered the last lap in sixth place more than two and a half seconds behind race leader Galen Rupp. At age 41, his final lap was 52.82, the fastest of the field and more than a second faster than any in the 1500 meter final. Joining Lagat on the team were Somali born Hassan Mead and Kenyan born Paul Chelimo, making for an entirely foreign born delegation. Lagat also became the oldest runner at the Summer Olympics to represent the United States. On August 20, 2016, Lagat initially claimed the 6th-place finish in the 5000 meters at the Olympics. He was moved to bronze after three runners were disqualified, but was moved back to 5th after 2 of the 3 were reinstated. He outsprinted Andrew Butchart of Great Britain, who is 17 years his junior, by more than a second.

Lagat ran his final race as a professional on September 3, 2016, at the ISTAF meet in Berlin where he came in second place in the 3,000 meters.

In May 2017 Lagat served as a pacer for Nike's Breaking2 attempt at achieving a sub-2-hour marathon time. Lagat also agreed to run as a pacer at a similar event, the Ineos 1:59 Challenge, in October 2019.

On September 10, 2017, Lagat finished eighth in the 2017 Great North Run half marathon in 1:03:02.

Lagat participated on his first marathon in New York City Marathon on 4 Nov, 2018 finishing 18th with a time of 2:17:20. He had a lead to the second-placed finisher in his age group of 11:15 minutes.

On 29 February 2020, Lagat placed 18th with a time of 2:14:23 in the Atlanta Olympic Trials Marathon. In preparation he had a 30 km training run with the world record holder Eliud Kipchoge in Kenya.

== Personal life ==
Lagat lives in Tucson, Arizona and Tübingen, Germany with his wife Gladys Tom (a Canadian of Chinese descent), whom he met while they both attended Washington State University, and their son Miika Kimutai (born in 2006) and daughter Gianna (born 2008). In 2023, Lagat was named by Carnegie Corporation of New York as an honoree of the Great Immigrants Awards. Lagat is Catholic.

Lagat is the current head cross country coach and an assistant track and field coach at the University of Arizona. During the track and field season, he coaches distance.

== International competitions ==
Year	Competition	Venue	Position	Event	Result
Representing Kenya
1999	Universiade	Palma de Mallorca, Spain	1st	1500 m	3:40.99
2000	Olympic Games	Sydney, Australia	3rd	1500 m	3:32.44
2001	World Indoor Championships	Lisbon, Portugal	6th	3000 m	7:45.52
2001	Goodwill Games	Brisbane, Australia	5th	Mile	3:57.10
2001	World Championships	Edmonton, Canada	2nd	1500 m	3:31.10
2002	African Championships	Radès, Tunisia	1st	1500 m	3:38.11
2002	World Cup	Madrid, Spain	1st	1500 m	3:31.20^{1}
2003	World Indoor Championships	Birmingham, United Kingdom	2nd	1500 m	3:42.62
2004	World Indoor Championships	Budapest, Hungary	1st	3000 m	7:56.34
2004	Olympic Games	Athens, Greece	2nd	1500 m	3:34.30
Representing the United States
2007	World Championships	Osaka, Japan	1st	1500 m	3:34.77
2007	World Championships	Osaka, Japan	1st	5000 m	13:45.87
2008	Olympic Games	Beijing, China	9th	5000 m	13:26.89
2009	World Championships	Berlin, Germany	3rd	1500 m	3:36.20
2009	World Championships	Berlin, Germany	2nd	5000 m	13:17.33
2010	World Indoor Championships	Doha, Qatar	1st	3000 m	7:37.97
2010	Continental Cup	Split, Croatia	1st	3000 m	7:54.75^{2}
2010	Continental Cup	Split, Croatia	1st	5000 m	13:58.23^{2}
2011	World Championships	Daegu, South Korea	2nd	5000 m	13:23.64
2012	World Indoor Championships	Istanbul, Turkey	1st	3000 m	7:41.44
2012	Olympic Games	London, United Kingdom	4th	5000 m	13:42.99
2013	World Championships	Moscow, Russia	6th	5000 m	13:29.24
2014	World Indoor Championships	Sopot, Poland	2nd	3000 m	7:55.22
2016	Olympic Games	Rio de Janeiro, Brazil	5th	5000 m	13:06.78

^{1}Representing Africa
^{2}Representing the Americas

== Statistics ==
=== Personal bests ===
Distance	Mark	Date	Location	Notes
1500 metres	3:26.34 NR	August 24, 2001	Brussels	Lagat's 1500 m PB is the Kenyan National Record. After becoming an American citizen, Lagat set an American record in the 1500 m of 3:29.30.
Mile	3:47.28	June 29, 2001	Rome	
Mile (indoor)	3:49.89	February 14, 2008	Boston	
3000 metres	7:29.00 AR	August 28, 2010	Rieti	Video on YouTube
Two miles (indoor)	8:09.49	February 16, 2013	New York	This was the North American AR until broken by Galen Rupp in January 2014
5000 metres	12:53.60 AR	July 22, 2011	Monaco	
10000 metres	27:49.36	May 1, 2016	Palo Alto	This is the Masters A40 WR
Half marathon	1:02:00	January 14, 2018	Houston	This is the Masters A40 American record
Marathon	2:12:10	July 6, 2019	Queensland, Australia	Likely to become Masters A40 American record

=== Records ===
Former American records of Bernard Lagat
Season	Indoor	Outdoor
Event	Time	Time
1500 m	3:33.34	3:29.30 (AR) or 3:27.40 (NR)
Mile	3:49.89	
3000 m		7:29.00
5000 m		12:53.60

- Lagat's American record in the short track 1500m and mile was broken by Yared Nuguse in February 2023.
- Lagat's American record in the outdoor 1500m was broken by Yared Nuguse in June 2023.
- Lagat's American record in the outdoor 3000m was broken by Grant Fisher in August 2022.
- Lagat's American record in the outdoor 5000m was broken by Grant Fisher in September 2022.
- All of Lagat's American records were also North American Area Records, apart from his 3:27.40 which was not recognized by NACAC.
- His time of 3:26.34 for the 1500 metres, set in 2001, remains the Kenyan and Commonwealth record for the event as well as the third-fastest mark of all time.
- The 3000 and 5000 marks, set since Lagat turned 35 years of age are also Masters World records and American Masters records. Lagat also holds the currently recognized Masters World record in the 1500 at 3:32.51 set at Herculis in 2010.
- He set the Masters World record for Age 40 at 3000 m in 7:48.33 on February 7, 2015, in Boston, and rebroke his own record in 7:37.71 on February 25, 2015, in Metz, France.
