= Liam Reale =

Irish middle-distance runner (born 1983)

Liam Reale (born 16 March 1983) is an Irish middle-distance runner who specializes in the 1500 metres.

As a younger athlete he finished fourth in 2000 m steeplechase at the 1999 World Youth Championships. He finished eighth in the 1500 m final at the 2006 European Athletics Championships.

His personal best time is 3:38.65 minutes, achieved in May 2006 in Waltham.

He was born in Limerick, and grew up in Hospital, County Limerick. He is a 2005 Graduate of Providence College.
