= Wolfram Müller =

German middle-distance runner

Personal information
- Born: 8 July 1981 (age 45) Pirna, East Germany

Sport
- Country: Germany
- Sport: Track
- Event: 1500 metres

Achievements and titles
- Personal best: 1500 metres: 3.35.50
Medal record
Men's athletics
Representing Germany
1999 European Junior Championships
Gold medal – first place	1999 European Athletics Junior Championships	5000 m
2000 World Junior Championships
Silver medal – second place	2000 World Junior Championships	1500 m

Wolfram Müller (born 8 July 1981 in Pirna) is a German middle-distance runner who specialises in the 1500 metres.

He became European junior 5000 metres champion in 1999. In his special distance he won the silver medal at the 2000 World Junior Championships and finished seventh at the 2005 European Indoor Championships. He also competed at the 2001 World Championships and the 2004 Olympic Games without reaching the finals.

His personal best time is 3:35.50 minutes, achieved in June 2003 in Milan.

He has competed for the athletics clubs LAV Tübingen and LSV Pirna.
