= 2004 IAAF World Indoor Championships =

10th IAAF World Indoor Championships
- Dates: 5 March–7 March
- Host city: Budapest, Hungary
- Venue: Budapest Arena
- Events: 28
- Participation: 677 athletes from 139 nations

The 10th IAAF World Indoor Championships in Athletics under the auspices of the International Association of Athletics Federations (IAAF) were held in the Budapest Arena, Hungary between March 5 and March 7, 2004. A total off 139 countries were represented by 677 athletes at the championships.

It was the second visit of the championships to Budapest having previously visited there 15 years earlier in 1989. The newly built 13,000 capacity arena was built on the site of a former stadium that was destroyed by fire in 1999.

This was the last World Indoor Championships where the 200 m event was contested. The event was discontinued as the tight bends involved in running indoors left athletes drawn to run on the inside lanes with minimal or no chance of winning.

== Results ==
=== Men ===
2001 | 2003 | 2004 | 2006 | 2008

Event	Gold		Silver		Bronze	
60 metres	Jason Gardener; Great Britain	6.49	Shawn Crawford; United States	6.52	Georgios Theodoridis; Greece	6.54 (=SB)
60 metres	After twice finishing third in the event Jason Gardener knew it was time to step up. With the quickest time from the semi-finals he was brimming with confidence and equalled that time of 6.49 seconds to take the gold ahead of the 2001 200 m champion Crawford. The Greek Theodoridis ran a season's best to take the third place medal ahead of Mickey Grimes USA (4th in personal best), Matic Osovnikar (5th in Slovenian record), Francis Obikwelu Portugal (6th), Simone Collio Italy (7th) and Niconnor Alexander (8th).					
200 metres	Dominic Demeritte; Bahamas	20.66 NR	Johan Wissman; Sweden	20.72	Tobias Unger; Germany	21.02
200 metres	In a poor year for the event Demeritte improved on his third position from Birmingham in 2003 to take gold in a new Bahamian record of 20.66 seconds albeit the slowest winning time since 1991. No other competitor in the final could even raise themselves to a season's best although there were national records in the heats for Heber Viera (21.36 s) of Uruguay, Marcelo Figueroa (22.8 s) El Salvador, Hamoud Abdallah Al-Dalhami (21.97 s) Oman and Russel Roman (23.68 s) of Palau though none of these athletes progressed through their respective rounds.					
400 metres	Alleyne Francique; Grenada	45.88 (SB)	Davian Clarke; Jamaica	45.92 (SB)	Gary Kikaya; DR Congo	46.30 (SB)
400 metres	The medal winners all ran season's best times, though not breaking any records. The other finalists were Sofiane Labidi (4th) from Tunisia, Milton Campbell USA (5th) and Joe Mendel USA (6th).					
800 metres	Mbulaeni Mulaudzi; South Africa	1:45.71	Rashid Ramzi; Bahrain	1:46.15 AR	Osmar dos Santos; Brazil	1:46.26
800 metres	Mulaudzi won South Africa's only medal of the championships beating Ramzi who became Bahrain's first ever medallist at either of the athletics world championships with an Asian record of 1:46.15, a four-second improvement on his semi-final time from the 2003 championships. The other finalists were Amine Laalou Morocco (4th), William Yiampoy Kenya (5th) and former World Junior Champion Joseph Mutua Kenya a disappointing (6th).					
1500 metres	Paul Korir; Kenya	3:52.31	Ivan Heshko; Ukraine	3:52.34	Laban Rotich; Kenya	3:52.93
1500 metres	In a tactical ran race Korir, who had progressed from the qualifying round as a fastest loser, held off Heshko by just 0.03 seconds with Rotich a further 0.5 seconds away in third. Rotich was only awarded the bronze one hour after the race when the athlete who had crossed the line in third place, Great Britain's Michael East, was disqualified for a pushing incident. Other finalists were Abdelkader Hachlaf Morocco (4th), James Thie Great Britain (5th), Mirosław Formela Poland (6th) and José Redolat Spain (7th) and Youssef Baba Morocco (8th).					
3000 metres	Bernard Lagat; Kenya	7:56.34	Rui Silva (athlete); Portugal	7:57.08	Markos Geneti; Ethiopia	7:57.87
3000 metres	On the comeback trail after pulling out of the 2003 outdoor championships due to a suspect positive drug test Bernard was overjoyed at taking gold ahead of Silva and Geneti. The other finalists were Spanish pair Antonio David Jiménez (4th) and Sergio Gallardo (5th), Gert-Jan Liefers, Netherlands (6th), Kevin Sullivan, Canada (7th), Moroccans Mohammed Amyne (8th) and Hicham Bellani (9th), Australian Craig Mottram (10th), Abiyote Abate, Ethiopia (11th) and Serhiy Lebid, Ukraine 12th.					
60 metres hurdles	Allen Johnson; United States	7.36 CR	Liu Xiang; China	7.43 AR	Maurice Wignall; Jamaica	7.48 NR
60 metres hurdles	After only qualifying for the final by virtue of being a fastest loser, Allen Johnson claimed his third world indoor title, to go with his four previous outdoor titles, in a championship record of 7.36 seconds ahead of Liu of China (2nd in Asian record) who went one better than his third in Birmingham the year before and Wignall (3rd in Jamaican record) who edged out, by 1/100th of a second, Stanislavs Olijars of Latvia (4th in personal best). Other finalists were Yuniel Hernández, Cuba (5th), Robert Kronberg, Sweden (6th in season's best), Yoel Hernández, Cuba (7th) and Dwight Thomas Jamaica (8th).					
4 × 400 metre relay	Jamaica (JAM); Gregory Haughton; Leroy Colquhoun; Michael McDonald; Davian Clarke; Richard James*; Sanjay Ayre*	3:05.21 WL	Russia (RUS); Dmitriy Forshev; Boris Gorban; Andrey Rudnitskiy; Aleksandr Usov	3:06.23 (SB)	Ireland (IRL); Robert Daly; Gary Ryan; David Gillick; David McCarthy	3:10.44
4 × 400 metre relay	With the United States of America team being disqualified, after crossing the line in third place, for dropping the baton and the Bahamian team falling over this was one of the most eventful races of the championships. This left the way open for the reigning silver medalists Jamaica to step in and snatch the gold ahead of the Russians who took silver and Ireland, who had broken the national record in the heats, going home with the bronze. Switzerland took 4th place with the Bahamians picking themselves off the floor to take 5th.					
High jump	Stefan Holm; Sweden	2.35	Yaroslav Rybakov; Russia	2.32 (SB)	Ştefan Vasilache; Romania	2.25
High jump	Stefan Holm; Sweden	2.35	Yaroslav Rybakov; Russia	2.32 (SB)	Germaine Mason; Jamaica	2.25
High jump	Stefan Holm; Sweden	2.35	Yaroslav Rybakov; Russia	2.32 (SB)	Jaroslav Bába; Czech Republic	2.25
High jump	Sweden's Stefan Holm went one better than his silver at the outdoors in 2003 with a straightforward win clearing all of his five heights at the first attempt to finish with 2.35 m. Rybakov was the only competitor to mount a challenge but he could only manage 2.32 metres. Five athletes were tied with jumps 10 cm behind the winner but countback saw Belarusian Gennadiy Moroz, Ukrainian Andriy Sokolovskyy and Ireland's Adrian O'Dwyer miss out on the medals with Jamie Nieto of USA completing the final line up.					
Pole vault	Igor Pavlov; Russia	5.80 (=PB)	Adam Ptácek; Czech Republic	5.70 (=SB)	Denys Yurchenko; Ukraine	5.70
Pole vault	In a below par pole vault Russian indoor national champion Pavlov took a surprise gold with a personal best of 5.80 m. followed by four athletes who all cleared 5.70 m. Ptácek took silver and Yurchenko bronze on countback ahead of Sweden's Patrik Kristiansson (4th), German Tim Lobinger (5th). 10 cm further behind were Italian Giuseppe Gibilisco (6th) and Romain Mesnil of France (7th). Netherlands' Rens Blom failed to clear his opening height of 5.60 metres to finish eighth.					
Long jump	Savanté Stringfellow; United States	8.40	James Beckford; Jamaica	8.31 (SB)	Vitaliy Shkurlatov; Russia	8.28 (SB)
Long jump	Savanté Stringfellow jumped exactly the same distance, 8.40 m, as he had when taking silver at the 2001 outdoors championships but this time got his hands on a gold medal. The 2003 outdoor silver medalist Beckford again finished second with Russian Shkurlatov completing the podium line-up. Romanian Bogdan Tarus (4th), Volodymyr Zyuskov, Ukraine (5th with a personal best), Great Britain's Chris Tomlinson set a national record finishing (6th), Sosunov Kirill, Russia (7th) and former five-time champion Iván Pedroso could only manage 8th place.					
Triple jump	Christian Olsson; Sweden	17.83 =WR	Jadel Gregório; Brazil	17.43	Yoandri Betanzos; Cuba	17.36
Triple jump	Olsson retained his title here with a third-round jump of 17.83 m to equal the seven-year-old indoor world record previously set by Cuba's Aliecer Urrutia in 1997. Gregório had his best performance by far in a major competition by taking home the silver with Betanzos taking the bronze. Other finalists were Belarusian Dmitriy Valyukevich (4th), Marian Oprea, Romania (5th in season's best), Ukrainian Savolaynen Mykola could not improve on the national record he set in qualifying to finish (6th), Danila Burkenya, Russia (7th) and France's Julien Kapek (8th).					
Shot put	Christian Cantwell; United States	21.49	Reese Hoffa; United States	21.07 (PB)	Joachim Olsen; Denmark	20.99
Shot put	The 23-year-old Cantwell added to the IAAF World Athletics Final victory from 2003 to take his second major win with his second round throw of 21.49 m. Compatriot Hoffa, 3 years his senior, made his first podium finish in a championship with a personal best opening distance of 21.07 m. ahead of the more experienced Dane Olsen. The improving Tomasz Majewski of Poland also raised his game to improve on the personal best he set in qualifying with a national record in the final but missed out on bronze by 16 cm. to take 4th place. The other finalists were reigning champion Manuel Martínez (5th), Belarusian Andrei Mikhnevich (6th), Great Britain's Carl Myerscough (7th) and Yuriy Bilonoh of Ukraine (8th).					
Heptathlon	Roman Šebrle; Czech Republic	6438 WL	Bryan Clay; United States	6365 (PB)	Lev Lobodin; Russia	6203 (SB)
Heptathlon	With one event to go, Šebrle lay 32 points behind Clay, with Lobodin a further 168 points back in third. But despite a personal best in the 1,000 m. Clay trailed in a massive 50 seconds behind Roman. This handed the gold to the Czech to give him the title to add to the gold he had won in 2001. Clay held onto silver with Lobodin safely in third. In this invitation only event Kazakhstan's Dmitriy Karpov finished fourth ahead of reigning Olympic champion Erki Nool from Estonia (5th), Aleksandr Pogorelov of Russia (6th), former silver medalist Jón Arnar Magnússon of Iceland in (7th) and Ranko Leskovar of Slovenia in (8th).					

=== Women ===
2001 | 2003 | 2004 | 2006 | 2008

Event	Gold		Silver		Bronze	
60 metres	Gail Devers; United States	7.08 (SB)	Kim Gevaert; Belgium	7.12 (NR)	Yulia Nestsiarenka; Belarus	7.12
60 metres	Gail Devers took her third 60 m gold, to add to her 60 m hurdles title won in 2003, ahead of Gevaert (Belgian record) who pipped Nestsiarenka to silver in a photo finish though both were given the same time. Other finalists were former bronze medalist Torri Edwards USA (4th), Muriel Hurtis France (5th in season's best), Yuliya Tabakova Russia (6th), Christine Arron France (7th) and Natalya Safronnikova Russia (8th).					
200 metres	Natallia Safronnikava; Belarus	23.13	Svetlana Goncharenko; Russia	23.15	Karin Mayr-Krifka; Austria	23.18
200 metres	Anastasiya Kapachinskaya had crossed the line first and been awarded the gold medal but this was later taken back after she tested positive for the anabolic steroid stanozolol. This moved Safronnikava up to the gold medal position, 2 places better than her only other medal performance at the indoor championships in 2001 though her winning time of 23.13 s was the slowest the title had been won in. Goncharenko moved into silver position the same place that she had finished in 1999 and one better than her 1997 finish, and Mayr-Krifka took a surprise bronze. The other finalists were Maryna Maydanova and Nataliya Pygyda both of Ukraine.					
400 metres	Natalya Nazarova; Russia	50.19 CR	Olesya Forsheva; Russia	50.65 (PB)	Tonique Williams-Darling; Bahamas	50.87 NR
400 metres	In a quickly run race Natalya took gold in a championship record of 50.19 seconds to retain her title with her two main challengers both running personal bests to claim the minor medals. The other finalists were Ionela Târlea ROM, Clay Julian USA and Fani Halkia GRE.					
800 metres	Maria de Lurdes Mutola; Mozambique	1:58.50	Jolanda Čeplak; Slovenia	1:58.72 (SB)	Joanne Fenn; Great Britain	1:59.50 NR
800 metres	Mutola took her record sixth individual gold in the event ahead of world record holder and main rival Jolanda. Joanne ran a personal best in taking the bronze setting a new national record of 1:59.50. Jen Toomey USA (4th) and Tatyana Andrianova RUS (5th) also set PB's with Olga Raspopova RUS coming in sixth.					
1500 metres	Kutre Dulecha; Ethiopia	4:06.40	Carmen Douma-Hussar; Canada	4:08.18 NR	Gulnara Samitova; Russia	4:08.26
1500 metres	Dulecha became Ethiopia's first ever women's 1,500 m medalist at the championships with a surprise win taking the gold ahead of Douma-Hussar (2nd), who set a Canadian national record and Samitova (3rd). It was by far Kutre's best performance at a major competition although she had set a junior world record at the distance outdoors back in 1997. The other finalists were Daniela Yordanova, Bulgaria (4th), Nataliya Tobias, Ukraine (5th), Yuliya Kosenkova Russia (6th), Alesya Turova, Belarus (7th), Lidia Okninska, Poland (8th) and Great Britain's Kelly Holmes who had probably been the favourite going into the race but took a fall just after halfway through the race and could not make up the ground eventually finishing 9th.					
3000 metres	Meseret Defar; Ethiopia	9:11.22	Berhane Adere; Ethiopia	9:11.43	Shayne Culpepper; United States	9:12.15
3000 metres	In the slowest women's 3,000 m the championship had seen, and 22 seconds slower than the quickest heat, 2003 bronze medalist Defar turned the tables on reigning champion Adere with Culpepper taking third. The other finalists were Spain's Marta Domínguez (4th), Great Britain's Joanne Pavey (5th), Yelena Zadorozhnaya, Russia (6th), Sabrina Mockenhaupt, Germany (7th), Ukraine's Maryna Dubrova (8th), Maria McCambridge, Ireland (9th), Belgian Veerle Dejaeghere (10th) and Galina Bogomolova (11th). Great Britain's Hayley Tullett had qualified for the final but did not start due to injury.					
60 metres hurdles	Perdita Felicien; Canada	7.75 CR	Gail Devers; United States	7.78	Linda Ferga-Khodadin; France	7.82 NR
60 metres hurdles	Canadian Felicien edged out reigning champion Devers by just 3/100th's of a second with Ferga-Khodadin third in a French national record. Other finalists were Joanna Hayes, USA (4th), Susanna Kallur, Sweden (5th), Lacena Golding-Clarke, Jamaica (6th), Flóra Redoúmi, Greece (7th) and Nicole Ramalalanirina, France (8th).					
4 × 400 metre relay	Russia (RUS); Olesya Krasnomovets; Olga Kotlyarova; Tatyana Levina; Natalya Nazarova	3:23.88 WR	Belarus (BLR); Natalya Sologub; Anna Kozak; Ilona Usovich; Svetlana Usovich	3:29.96 NR	Romania (ROU); Angela Moroșanu; Alina Râpanu; Maria Rus; Ionela Târlea	3:30.06 NR
4 × 400 metre relay	A scintillating run by the Russian women's team saw them take gold in a world record time of 3:23.88. The second placed Belarusians broke their national record to claim silver and the Romanians did the same to take the bronze. Poland also broke their national record but finished without a medal in 4th with the Jamaican ladies finishing 5th and the Greek team, who also set a national record in the heats coming in 6th. An inexperienced USA team could only manage fourth place in their first round heat.					
High jump	Yelena Slesarenko; Russia	2.04 =WL	Anna Chicherova; Russia	2.00	Blanka Vlašić; Croatia	1.97
High jump	Two 22-year-old Russians took the main medals with Slesarenko beating her compatriot Chicherova with a near faultless display, failing on only one of her jumps. Blanka took bronze on countback ahead of Ukrainian Vita Palamar (4th) and Daniela Rath of Germany (5th) all clearing 1.97 m. Spain's Marta Mendía set a personal best in qualifying for the final but ended up in 6th place ahead of Bulgarian Venelina Veneva (7th) and Viktoriya Styopina of Ukraine in 8th.					
Pole vault	Yelena Isinbayeva; Russia	4.86 WR	Stacy Dragila; United States	4.81 AR	Svetlana Feofanova; Russia	4.70
Pole vault	With three former winners of the title along with the previous years silver medalist this was always going to be a fascinating contest in this relatively young event. The 21-year-old world junior record holder Isinbayeva added to her growing reputation with a world record clearance of 4.86 m. to improve on her silver from a year ago and her bronze at the 2003 outdoors championship taking the gold ahead of the reigning Olympic champion Dragila in silver and reigning world champion Feofanova, bronze. Jillian Schwartz of USA set a personal best in 4th place ahead of Vanessa Boslak who set a French national record in finishing equal fifth with Monika Pyrek of Poland. Pyrek compatriot Anna Rogowska took 7th place with a disappointing 8th place for 1999 champion Nastja Ryjikh.					
Long jump	Tatyana Lebedeva; Russia	6.98 WL	Tatyana Kotova; Russia	6.93 (SB)	Carolina Klüft; Sweden	6.92 NR
Long jump	Lebedeva, fresh from her world record in the triple jump the previous day, jumped a world leading distance of 6.98 m to record her second gold medal ahead of reigning champion Kotova who jumped a season's best and Sweden's heptathlete queen Klüft who set a national record. The other finalists were China's Yingnan Guan (4th), Latvia's Valentīna Gotovska (5th), Italy's Fiona May (6th), Spain's Concepción Montaner (7th) Adina Anton of Romania who finished 8th.					
Triple jump	Tatyana Lebedeva; Russia	15.36 WR	Yamilé Aldama; Sudan	14.90 AR	Hrysopiyí Devetzí; Greece	14.73
Triple jump	Lebedeva first qualifying jump put her through to the final where her second round jump of 15.25 m gave her a comfortable lead over the field. She then opted out of her third and fifth round jumps saving herself in case a big jump was required in the final round. Her nearest rival Aldama had recorded 14.90 m also in the second round to lie in silver medal position with Devetzí's fourth round 14.73 m giving her bronze. Tatyana decided to take her last jump in the knowledge that gold medal was hers and produced a world record jump of 15.36 m. She followed this up by winning the long jump also the following day. The other finalists were Trecia Smith (4th in a Jamaican record), Italy's Magdelín Martínez (5th), Françoise Mbango Etone of Cameroon (6th), Romania's Adelina Gavrilă (7th), Olena Hovorova, Ukraine (8th), Mabel Gay, Cuba (9th), Baya Rahouli, Algeria (10th), Italy's Simona La Mantia (11th) and Natallia Safronava of Belarus (12th).					
Shot put	Svetlana Krivelyova; Russia	19.90 (SB)	Yumileidi Cumbá; Cuba	19.31 (SB)	Nadine Kleinert; Germany	19.05 (SB)
Shot put	In an amazing turn of events Ukrainian Vita Pavlysh finished first only to be stripped of her title when receiving a lifetime ban after testing positive for anabolic steroids again. This was a repeat of the events following the 1999 Indoor Championship when she had also taken the gold only for it to be taken away when she was given a two-year ban for the same offence. This left Krivelyova to actually be awarded first place ahead of Cumbá and Kleinert. The other finalists were Krystyna Zabawska tantalisingly just 5 cm. back in 4th, China's Li Meiju (5th), Misleydis González of Cuba 6th, and two-time silver medalist Nadzeya Astapchuk of Belarus 7th.					
Pentathlon	Naide Gomes; Portugal	4759 WL	Nataliya Dobrynska; Ukraine	4727 NR	Austra Skujytė; Lithuania	4679 NR
Pentathlon	With the lowest ever winning number of points, Gomes, who had led from the third event held on from Dobrynska by 32 points with Lithuanian Skujyte a further 48 points behind in the bronze medal position. The second- and third-place finishers set national records as did Karin Ruckstuhl of Netherlands who was (4th). Belgium's Tia Hellebaut came (5th), Irina Butor of Belarus (6th), Larisa Netšeporuk of Estonia (7th) with Kim Schiemenz of USA completing the line up in (8th) place.					

== Medal table ==
Rank	Nation	Gold	Silver	Bronze	Total
1	Russia (RUS)	8	6	4	18
2	United States (USA)	4	5	1	10
3	Ethiopia (ETH)	2	1	1	4
3	Sweden (SWE)	2	1	1	4
5	Kenya (KEN)	2	0	1	3
6	Jamaica (JAM)	1	2	2	5
7	Czech Republic (CZE)	1	1	1	3
8	Canada (CAN)	1	1	0	2
8	Portugal (POR)	1	1	0	2
10	Bahamas (BAH)	1	0	1	2
10	Great Britain (GBR)	1	0	1	2
12	Grenada (GRD)	1	0	0	1
12	Mozambique (MOZ)	1	0	0	1
12	South Africa (RSA)	1	0	0	1
15	Belarus (BLR)	0	2	1	3
15	Ukraine (UKR)	0	2	1	3
17	Brazil (BRA)	0	1	1	2
18	Bahrain (BHR)	0	1	0	1
18	Belgium (BEL)	0	1	0	1
18	China (CHN)	0	1	0	1
18	Slovenia (SLO)	0	1	0	1
18	Sudan (SUD)	0	1	0	1
23	Cuba (CUB)	0	0	2	2
23	Greece (GRE)	0	0	2	2
23	Romania (ROM)	0	0	2	2
26	Croatia (CRO)	0	0	1	1
26	DR Congo (COD)	0	0	1	1
26	Denmark (DEN)	0	0	1	1
26	France (FRA)	0	0	1	1
26	Germany (GER)	0	0	1	1
26	Ireland (IRL)	0	0	1	1
26	Lithuania (LTU)	0	0	1	1
Totals (32 entries)		27	28	29	84

== Participating nations ==
- Albania (2)
- Algeria (2)
- Angola (1)
- Armenia (1)
- Australia (8)
- Austria (3)
- Bahamas (9)
- Bahrain (3)
- Barbados (1)
- Belarus (16)
- Belgium (11)
- Benin (1)
- Bolivia (1)
- Botswana (2)
- Brazil (10)
- Bulgaria (7)
- Burkina Faso (1)
- Burundi (1)
- Cameroon (3)
- Canada (10)
- Cape Verde (1)
- Cayman Islands (1)
- Chad (1)
- Chile (1)
- China (9)
- Cook Islands (1)
- Costa Rica (1)
- Croatia (3)
- Cuba (11)
- Cyprus (2)
- Czech Republic (11)
- Democratic Republic of the Congo (2)
- Denmark (2)
- Dominica (2)
- Egypt (1)
- Estonia (2)
- Ethiopia (7)
- Federated States of Micronesia (1)
- Finland (6)
- France (25)
- Gabon (2)
- Germany (21)
- Ghana (3)
- Great Britain (25)
- Greece (19)
- Grenada (1)
- Guam (1)
- Guyana (1)
- Haiti (1)
- Hong Kong (1)
- Hungary (17)
- Iceland (2)
- Indonesia (1)
- Iran (1)
- Ireland (13)
- Israel (1)
- Italy (14)
- Jamaica (24)
- Japan (3)
- Jordan (1)
- Kazakhstan (3)
- Kenya (6)
- Kuwait (1)
- Kyrgyzstan (1)
- Latvia (3)
- Liberia (1)
- Libya (1)
- Lebanon (2)
- Lithuania (2)
- Luxembourg (1)
- Macau (1)
- Malawi (1)
- Malaysia (1)
- Maldives (1)
- Mali (1)
- Malta (1)
- Mauritania (1)
- Mauritius (2)
- Mexico (1)
- Moldova (1)
- Monaco (1)
- Morocco (10)
- Mozambique (1)
- Namibia (2)
- Nepal (1)
- Netherlands (11)
- New Zealand (2)
- Nicaragua (1)
- Nigeria (3)
- Oman (1)
- Pakistan (1)
- Palau (1)
- Palestine (1)
- Papua New Guinea (1)
- Paraguay (1)
- Peru (1)
- Philippines (1)
- Poland (18)
- Portugal (8)
- Puerto Rico (2)
- Qatar (1)
- Romania (18)
- Russia (50)
- El Salvador (1)
- Saint Kitts and Nevis (1)
- Saint Vincent and the Grenadines (1)
- Samoa (1)
- San Marino (1)
- São Tomé and Príncipe (1)
- Saudi Arabia (1)
- Senegal (2)
- Serbia and Montenegro (1)
- Seychelles (1)
- Sierra Leone (1)
- Slovakia (1)
- Slovenia (9)
- Solomon Islands (1)
- South Africa (4)
- South Korea (1)
- Spain (32)
- Sudan (3)
- Sweden (16)
- Switzerland (5)
- Tajikistan (1)
- Tanzania (2)
- Thailand (1)
- Togo (1)
- Trinidad and Tobago (3)
- Tunisia (1)
- Turkey (1)
- Turkmenistan (1)
- Uganda (2)
- Ukraine (23)
- United States (48)
- United States Virgin Islands (1)
- Uruguay (1)
- Uzbekistan (1)
- Zambia (1)
- Zimbabwe (1)
