= Ivan Heshko =

Ukrainian middle-distance track athlete (born 1979)

Personal information
- Born: August 19, 1979 (age 47) Klivodyn, Chernivtsi Oblast, Ukrainian SSR, USSR

Sport
- Country: Ukraine
- Sport: Track
- Event: 1500 metres

Achievements and titles
- Personal bests: 1500 metres: 3:30.33; Mile: 3:50.04
Medal record
Men's athletics
Representing Ukraine
World Championships
| Bronze medal – third place | 2003 Paris | 1500 m |
World Indoor Championships
| Gold medal – first place | 2006 Moscow | 1500 m |
| Silver medal – second place | 2004 Budapest | 1500 m |
European Championships
| Silver medal – second place | 2006 Gothenburg | 1500 m |
European Indoor Championships
| Gold medal – first place | 2005 Madrid | 1500 m |
Summer Universiade
| Gold medal – first place | 2005 Izmir | 1500 m |
IAAF World Cup
| Silver medal – second place | 2006 Athens | 1500 m |
World Athletics Final
| Gold medal – first place | 2004 Monte Carlo | 1500 m |
| Gold medal – first place | 2005 Monte Carlo | 1500 m |
| Bronze medal – third place | 2003 Monte Carlo | 1500 m |
European Cup
| Gold medal – first place | 2006 Málaga | 1500 m |
| Silver medal – second place | 2006 Málaga | 800 m |
European U23 Championships
| Silver medal – second place | 2001 Amsterdam | 1500 m |

Ivan Heshko (Ukrainian: Іван Гешко) (born August 19, 1979) is a Ukrainian middle-distance track athlete who specialized in the 1500 meters. He represented Ukraine at the 2004 Summer Olympics and holds multiple Ukrainian records in athletics.

== Running career ==
Heshko started to train at the age of 14. From an early age he had played football and handball, but eventually focused solely on athletics. He achieved his studies at the Teacher's Training College: Kamenets-Podolskiy. A member of an Italian athletic club, he has been trained by Georgiy Mironiouk since 1992, and has five times been the champion of his country, including a bronze medal in 2003 at the World Championships (Paris/Saint-Denis) and silver in the 1500 m at the 2004 IAAF World Indoor Championships in Budapest.

At Athens 2004, Heshko finished fifth in 1500 m. He also competed in 800 meters, but failed to advance in the semi-finals. His personal best time of 3:30.33 (1500 m), accomplished during the 2004 meeting of Brussel, is also a Ukrainian national record.

In 2005 Heshko won the European Indoor Championships, the Summer Universiade and the World Athletics Final and finished fourth at the World Championships. He started the next year by winning the World Indoor Championships in Moscow, comfortably ahead of two Kenyan runners, completing 1500 m in 3:42.08.

In August 2006, Heshko won the silver medal at the 2006 European Championships in Athletics in Gothenburg.

== See also ==
- Ukraine at the 2004 Summer Olympics
