= Michael East (athlete) =

English middle-distance runner

Personal information
- Nationality: British (English)
- Born: 20 January 1978 (age 48) Reading, England
- Height: 188 cm (6 ft 2 in)
- Weight: 68 kg (150 lb)

Sport
- Sport: Athletics
- Event: middle-distance
- Club: Newham and Essex Beagles
Medal record
Representing Great Britain
Men's athletics
Commonwealth Games
Representing England
Gold medal – first place	2002 Manchester	1500 metres

Michael John East (born 20 January 1978) is a retired middle-distance athlete who won the 1500 metres gold medal at the 2002 Commonwealth Games and competed at the 2004 Summer Olympics.

== Biography ==
East represented England at the 2002 Commonwealth Games in Manchester, where he won the gold medal. He was the last British male to win a major 1500m title until Jake Wightman became World Champion in 2022.

East became the British 1500 metres champion after winning the British AAA Championships title at the 2001 AAA Championships. In the IAAF European Cup, East finishing second and third in 2002 and 2003 respectively in the 1500 metres event. He nearly added to his medal tally when finishing third at the 2004 IAAF World Indoor Championships in Budapest, Hungary only to find himself disqualified for interfering with the run of the Kenyan Laban Rotich.

He reached the final of the 1500m at the 2004 Summer Olympics in Athens, finishing in 6th place. He was the only British male at those Games to reach an individual athletics final on the track. He was a semi-finalist at the 2005 IAAF World Championships but missed most of the 2006 and 2007 seasons because of a knee injury. As a result, in November 2007 he had his lottery funding removed, making it much harder for him to return to top rank competition. He had to rely on financial support from two Portsmouth companies. East called the decision by UK Athletics "crazy" and "shortsighted." He returned to compete at the 2008 IAAF World Indoor Championships but was not selected for the squad for the 2008 Summer Olympics as he could finish only 8th in the trials held in July. He announced his retirement on 8 September 2008.
