= Memorial Peppe Greco =

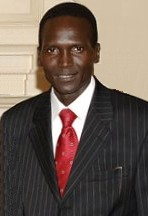
Paul Tergat was the winner of the first international competition

The Memorial Peppe Greco is an annual men's 10 kilometres road race which takes place in Scicli, Italy. Also known as the Scicli 10km, the race was created in 1990 by Giovanni Voi. The course consists of ten one-kilometre laps on the streets of the city, which includes a difficult 300-metre stretch uphill over cobblestones.

== History ==
After varying distances in the first four years of the race, the course was standardised to its current format in 1994. A local man, Giorgio Adamo, won the first race but over the following years the high quality of the competition established the Memorial Peppe Greco as an elite-level meeting on the European road running circuit, with past winners including world record breakers Paul Tergat, Haile Gebrselassie and Kenenisa Bekele.

The race was created to honour Peppe Greco, an Italian doctor who died in a car accident. It became an international competition in 1994 and rose to prominence in 1995 after Haile Gebrselassie and Paul Tergat chose to use the race as their first "re-match" after the World Championship 10,000 metres final.

The course record is held by Haile Gebrselassie, who ran 28 minutes and 22 seconds to win the 1997 edition of the race. A women's five kilometres race was also held in 2000 and 2001, and Merima Denboba is the course record holder with 16 minutes and 32 seconds. A new women's race was introduced in 2010 and took place over a course of roughly 7 km, a day before the men's race.

== Winners ==
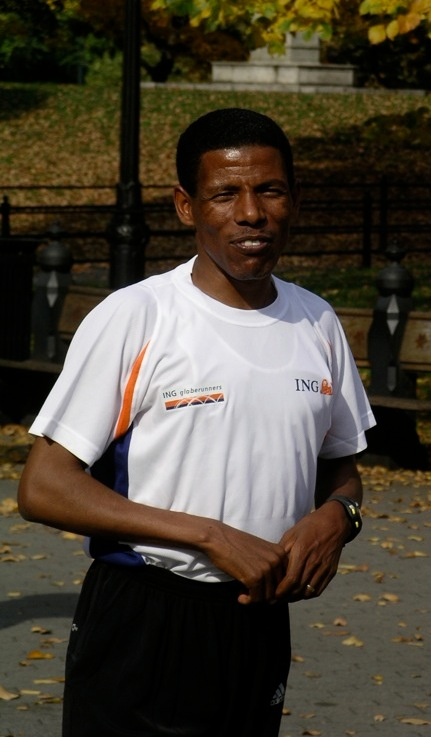
Course record holder Haile Gebrselassie is a four-time race winner

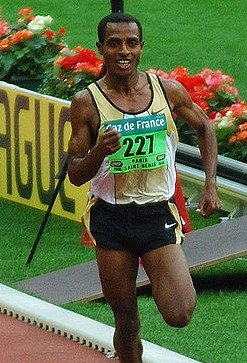
Kenenisa Bekele, the 10,000 m world record holder, won in 2003

Men's race
Year	Winner	Nationality	Time (m:s)
1990	Giorgio Adamo	Italy	32:54
1991	Giorgio Adamo	Italy	?
1992	Geri Interrante	Italy	19:24 (6.5 km)
1993	Francesco Bennici	Italy	23:24 (8.3 km)
1994	Paul Tergat	Kenya	?
1995	Haile Gebrselassie	Ethiopia	28:39
1996	Haile Gebrselassie	Ethiopia	28:42
1997	Haile Gebrselassie	Ethiopia	28:22 CR
1998	Haile Gebrselassie	Ethiopia	28:59
1999	Paul Tergat	Kenya	29:31
2000	Brahim Lahlafi	Morocco	28:38
2001	Hailu Mekonnen	Ethiopia	29:19
2002	Charles Kamathi	Kenya	28:31
2003	Kenenisa Bekele	Ethiopia	28:50
2004	Sileshi Sihine	Ethiopia	28:41
2005	Stefano Baldini	Italy	29:36
2006	Martin Lel	Kenya	28:45
2007	Martin Lel	Kenya	29:02
2008	Edwin Soi	Kenya	28:57
2009	Edwin Soi	Kenya	29:01
2010	Edwin Soi	Kenya	29:17
2011	Imane Merga	Ethiopia	28:37
2012	Hillary Kiprono Bii	Kenya	29:23
2013	Thomas Lokomwa	Kenya	29:18
2014	Silas Kirwa Ngetic	Kenya	29:41

Women's race
Year	Winner	Nationality	Time (m:s)
2010	Sylvia Kibet	Kenya	23:33
2011	Sylvia Kibet	Kenya	24:35

== See also ==
- BOclassic
- Giro di Castelbuono
