= Mo Farah =

British track and field athlete (born 1983)

Sir Mo Farah CBE OLY
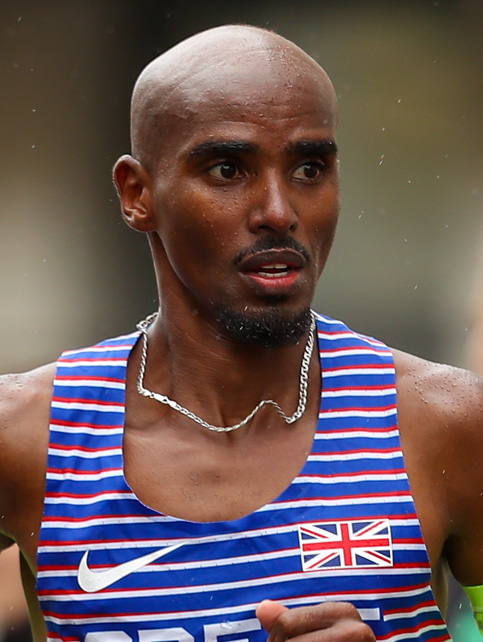
- Farah at the 2023 London Marathon

Personal information
- Full name: Mohamed Muktar Jamah Farah
- Citizenship: United Kingdom
- Born: Hussein Abdi Kahin; 23 March 1983 (age 43) Gabiley, Somaliland
- Monuments: Gold postboxes: Isleworth, London; Teddington, London; Madame Tussauds wax sculpture in Marylebone
- Occupation: Runner
- Years active: 1996–2023
- Height: 175 cm (5 ft 9 in)
- Weight: 58 kg (128 lb)
- Spouse: Tania Nell (m. 2010)
- Website: mofarah.com

Sport
- Country: Great Britain
- Sport: Athletics/Track, Long-distance running
- Events: 10,000 metres, 5000 metres, 1500 metres, Half marathon, Marathon
- University team: St Mary's University Twickenham, London
- Club: Newham and Essex Beagles, London
- Coached by: Charles Van Commenee; Alan Storey; Alan Watkinson; Ian Stewart; (formerly) Alberto Salazar

Achievements and titles
- Olympic finals: 2008 Beijing; 5000 m, 17th (h); 2012 London; 10,000 m, Gold; 5000 m, Gold; 2016 Rio de Janeiro; 10,000 m, Gold; 5000 m, Gold
- World finals: 2007 Osaka; 5000 m, 6th; 2009 Berlin; 5000 m, 7th; 2011 Daegu; 10,000 m, Silver; 5000 m, Gold; 2013 Moscow; 10,000 m, Gold; 5000 m, Gold; 2015 Beijing; 10,000 m, Gold; 5000 m, Gold; 2017 London; 10,000 m, Gold; 5000 m, Silver
- Personal bests: Outdoor; 800 m: 1:48.24 (Lugano 2008); 1500 m: 3:28.81 (Monaco 2013); Mile: 3:56.49 (London 2005); 3000 m: 7:32.62 NR (Birmingham 2016); 2-mile: 8:07.85 (Birmingham 2014); 5000 m: 12:53.11 NR (Monaco 2011); 10,000 m: 26:46.57 ER (Eugene 2011); 20,000 m: 56:20.30 NR (Brussels 2020); Hour run: 21,330 m WR (Brussels 2020); Indoor; Mile: 3:57.92 (Boston 2012); 3000 m: 7:33.1i+ h (Birmingham 2015); 2-mile: 8:03.40i (Birmingham 2015); 5000 m: 13:09.16i (Birmingham 2017); Road; 10 km: 27:44 NR (London 2010); Half marathon: 59:07a ER (South Shields 2019); Marathon: 2:05:11 NR (Chicago 2018)
Medal record
Event	1st	2nd	3rd
Olympic Games	4	0	0
World Championships	6	2	0
World Half Marathon Championships	0	0	1
European Championships	5	1	0
European Indoor Championships	2	0	0
European Cross Country Championships	1	3	1
European Team Championships	1	0	0
European U23 Championships	0	3	0
Total	19	9	2
Men's athletics
Representing Great Britain
Olympic Games
Gold medal – first place	2012 London	5000 m
Gold medal – first place	2012 London	10,000 m
Gold medal – first place	2016 Rio de Janeiro	5000 m
Gold medal – first place	2016 Rio de Janeiro	10,000 m
World Championships
Gold medal – first place	2011 Daegu	5000 m
Gold medal – first place	2013 Moscow	5000 m
Gold medal – first place	2013 Moscow	10,000 m
Gold medal – first place	2015 Beijing	5000 m
Gold medal – first place	2015 Beijing	10,000 m
Gold medal – first place	2017 London	10,000 m
Silver medal – second place	2011 Daegu	10,000 m
Silver medal – second place	2017 London	5000 m
Diamond League
Gold medal – first place	2017	5000 m
World Half Marathon Championships
Bronze medal – third place	2016 Cardiff	Individual
European Championships
Silver medal – second place	2006 Gothenburg	5000 m
Gold medal – first place	2010 Barcelona	5000 m
Gold medal – first place	2010 Barcelona	10,000 m
Gold medal – first place	2012 Helsinki	5000 m
Gold medal – first place	2014 Zürich	5000 m
Gold medal – first place	2014 Zürich	10,000 m
European Indoor Championships
Gold medal – first place	2009 Torino	3000 m
Gold medal – first place	2011 Paris	3000 m
European Cross Country Championships
Gold medal – first place	2006 San Giorgio su Legnano	Individual
Silver medal – second place	2008 Brussels	Individual
Silver medal – second place	2009 Dublin	Individual
Silver medal – second place	2009 Dublin	Team
Bronze medal – third place	2008 Brussels	Team
Half Marathon
Gold medal – first place	2019 Newcastle	Individual
Gold medal – first place	2018 Newcastle	Individual
Gold medal – first place	2017 Newcastle	Individual
Gold medal – first place	2016 Newcastle	Individual
Gold medal – first place	2015 Newcastle	Individual
Gold medal – first place	2014 Newcastle	Individual
Silver medal – second place	2013 Newcastle	Individual
World Marathon Majors
Gold medal – first place	2018 Chicago	Marathon
Bronze medal – third place	2018 London	Marathon

Sir Mohamed "Mo" Muktar Jama Farah (born Hussein Abdi Kahin, 23 March 1983) is a British former long-distance runner. He holds the record for the most global championship gold medals (four Olympic and six World titles), making him the most successful male track distance runner in the history of the sport, and he is the most successful British track athlete in Olympic Games history.

Farah is the 2012 and 2016 Olympic gold medallist in both the 5,000 m and 10,000 m. He is the second athlete, after Lasse Virén, to win both the 5,000 m and 10,000 m titles at successive Olympic Games. He also completed the 'distance double' at the 2013 and 2015 World Championships in Athletics. He was the first man to defend both distance titles in both major global competitions; a feat described as the 'quadruple-double'. After finishing second in the 10,000 metres at the 2011 World Championships, Farah had an unbroken streak of ten global final wins (the 5,000 m in 2011, the double in 2012, 2013, 2015 and 2016, and the 10,000 m in 2017). The streak ended in Farah's final championship track race, when he finished second to Ethiopia's Muktar Edris in the 2017 5,000 metres final.

On the track, Farah mostly competed over 5,000 metres and 10,000 metres, but has run competitively from 1,500 metres to the marathon. In 2017, he indicated his intention to switch wholly to road racing following victory at his final track race, the 2017 IAAF Diamond League 5,000-meter final. He won the 2018 Chicago Marathon in a time of 2:05:11, a European record. His running style has been described as bouncy and tactical, which he has attempted to alter for a more efficient and energy-saving stride pattern, especially in the longer distances. Farah runs distance races tactically, a style which is aided by his especially quick sprint finish. His tactics were described in Athletics Weekly: "(Farah) could run 24 strong laps of the track, which most of his East African rivals could match, before a blistering 400 metre sprint to the line, which none of them could."

Born Hussein Abdi Kahin in the Somali Democratic Republic, he was trafficked from Djibouti to London under the name of another child, Mohamed Farah, at the age of nine and was forced into child labour. He adopted the name as his own thereafter and became a British citizen. He ran for the Newham and Essex Beagles athletics club, training at St Mary's University College, Twickenham from 2001 to 2011. He did not reveal that he was a victim of trafficking until 2022.

Farah is the current world record holder for the one-hour run (21,330 m) and the current European record holder for the outdoor 10,000 m (26:46.57). He is also the current British record holder for the 3,000 m (7:32.62) and 5,000 m (12:53.11). He formerly held the world best for the short track two miles at 8:03.40 (broken by Josh Kerr in 2024 with an 8:00.67 clocking), and also formerly held the European best in the outdoor two mile (8:07.85) and 3000 m (7:32.62), until Jakob Ingebrigtsen broke the 2 mile in 2023 with a new world best of 7:54.10 and the 3,000 m in 2024 with a world record time of 7:17.55. Farah was also the former British short track record holder for the 3,000 m, at 7:33.1+ (broken by Sam Atkin in 2023 with 7:31.97). Farah also held the 1500 m British Record (3:28.81), which was broken by Josh Kerr in 2024 with a time of 3:27.79.

Farah was the first British athlete to win two gold medals at the same world championships. His five gold medals at the European Athletics Championships made him the most successful male athlete in the championships' history in individual events. He has won the European Athlete of the Year award and the British Athletics Writers Association British Athlete of the Year award more than any other athlete, three times and six times respectively. In 2017, Farah won the BBC Sports Personality of the Year. Farah was appointed Commander of the Order of the British Empire (CBE) in 2013 and was knighted by Queen Elizabeth II in the 2017 New Year Honours for services to athletics.

== Early life and education ==
Hussein Abdi Kahin (Somali: Xuseen Cabdi Kaahin) was born on 23 March 1983 in the Somali Democratic Republic. He belongs to the Jibril Abokor sub-division of the Habr Awal clan, itself part of the Isaaq clan-family. His father died in the Somali Rebellion when Kahin was aged four, and he then became separated from his mother. He subsequently spent a few years in Mogadishu before, at the age of nine, he was illegally trafficked to the United Kingdom via Djibouti, where he was given the name Mohammed Farah and was forced to work as a domestic servant. Farah was flown from Somalia by a woman he had never met and was made to look after her family's children, as "it was common in their culture". He obtained British citizenship in July 2000 under the name Mohamed Farah. These aspects of his background were not made public until July 2022, and a barrister told him that there was a risk that he might lose his British nationality as it was obtained by misrepresentations; the Home Office, however, assured him that he would not face any repercussions.

For the first years he was in Britain, he was not allowed to go to school, but when he was 11 or 12, he began to attend Year 7 at Feltham Community College, where staff were told he was a refugee from Somalia. His athletic talent was first identified by physical education teacher Alan Watkinson. Farah's ambition at the time was to play as a right winger for Arsenal football club, or become a car mechanic.

Farah was a student at Isleworth and Syon school. In 2022, he gave an interview to current students.

== Sporting career ==
=== Early years ===
Farah joined the Borough of Hounslow Athletics Club in west London. He represented Hounslow at cross-country in the 1994 London Youth Games as an under-13. In 1996, at the age of 13, he entered the English schools cross-country championships and finished ninth. The following year he won the first of five English school titles. Recognising his talent, athletics philanthropist Eddie Kulukundis paid the legal fees to complete Farah's naturalisation as a British citizen, allowing him to travel to competitions without visa issues.

Farah's first major title was in the 5000 metres at the 2001 European Athletics Junior Championships, the same year that he began training at St Mary's University, Twickenham. That year, Farah became one of the first two athletes in the newly formed Endurance Performance Centre at St Mary's. He lived and trained at the college and took some modules in an access course before becoming a full-time athlete as his career progressed.

=== 2005–2008: First titles and personal bests ===
In 2005, Farah moved in with Australian Craig Mottram and a group of Kenyan runners that included 10,000 m world number one Micah Kogo. "They sleep, eat, train and rest, that's all they do but as an athlete you have to do all those things. Running with Craig made me feel more positive," Farah said. "If I ever want to be as good as these athletes I've got to work harder. I don't just want to be British number one, I want to be up there with the best."

In July 2006, Farah recorded a time of 13 minutes 9.40 seconds for 5000 m to become Britain's second-fastest runner after Dave Moorcroft. A month later, Farah won the silver medal in the 5000 m at the European Championships in Gothenburg. Coaches Alan Storey and Mark Rowland made sure that Farah remained competitive and a few words from Paula Radcliffe before the 5000 m final inspired Farah. He has stated that: "She said to me, 'Go out and be brave. Just believe in yourself'." In December 2006, Farah won the 2006 European Cross Country Championships in San Giorgio su Legnano, Italy.

During the 2007 European Indoor Championship Farah fell and amid confusion started running in the wrong direction. Farah represented the UK at 5000 m in the 2007 World Championships in Osaka, Japan. Farah finished sixth in a time of 13:47.54.

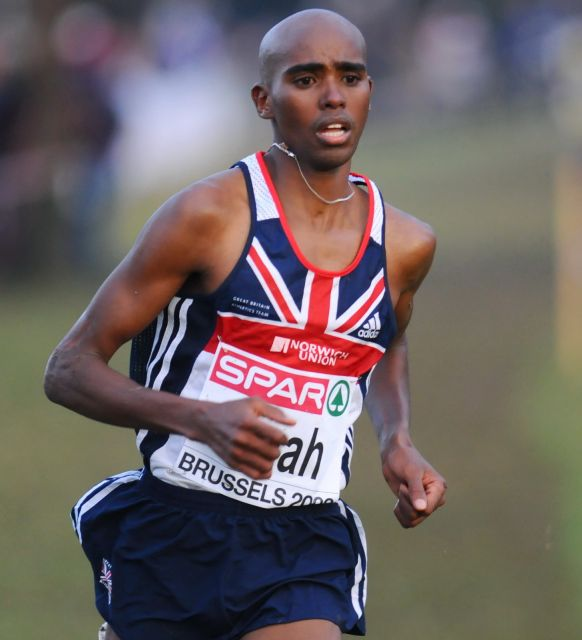
Farah at the 2008 European Cross Country Championships

In May 2008, Farah ran 10,000 m, setting the fastest UK men's time for almost 8 years. However, he was knocked out before the 5000 m final at the 2008 Olympics in Beijing.

=== 2009–2010: British records and European champion ===
In January 2009, Farah set a new British indoor record in the 3000 metres, breaking John Mayock's record with a time of 7 minutes 40.99 seconds in Glasgow. A few weeks later, he broke his own record by more than six seconds with a time of 7 minutes 34.47 at the UK Indoor Grand Prix in Birmingham, a performance which commentator Steve Cram called "the best performance by a male British distance runner for a generation". Farah attributed his good form to a spell of winter training at altitude in Ethiopia and Kenya. In March 2009 he took gold in the 3000 m at the European Indoor Championships in Turin, recording a time of 7 minutes 40.17.

Farah competed at the 2009 World Championships in Athletics: he was in the leading pack early on in the 5000 metres race and eventually finished seventh – the best by a European runner. After the championships, he scored a victory in his first road competition over 10 miles, winning the Great South Run in 46:25 to become the third fastest Briton in spite of strong winds.

Farah was one of the favourites to upset Serhiy Lebid's dominance at the 2009 European Cross Country Championships. However, Lebid was never in contention as Farah and Alemayehu Bezabeh were some distance ahead throughout the run. Farah was overtaken by Bezabeh in the latter stages of the race, leaving the Briton with a second consecutive silver medal at the competition. He did not manage to attend the medal ceremony, however, as he collapsed immediately after the race and needed medical attention. After a close third place behind Edwin Soi at the BOclassic, Farah competed in the short course race at the Great Edinburgh Cross Country. He was the favourite to win and surged ahead to build a comfortable lead. However, he appeared tired in the latter stages and finished third behind British runners Ricky Stevenson and Steve Vernon. Farah again required post-race medical attention, and subsequent tests revealed he had low levels of iron and magnesium. He was prescribed supplements for the condition, and his high-altitude training plans in Kenya were unaffected.

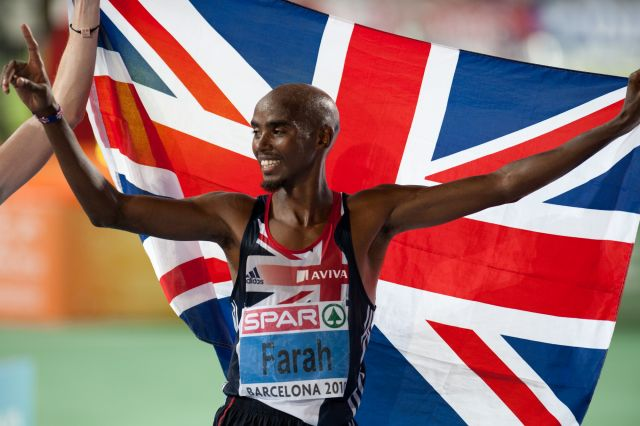
Farah celebrates winning the 10,000 m at the 2010 European Athletics Championships.

Farah won the 2010 London 10,000 in late May in a time of 27:44, in the process beating 10K world record holder Micah Kogo. His success continued the following week at the European Cup 10,000 m. There, he improved his track best by nearly 16 seconds, finishing in a time of 27:28.86. Farah won by a margin of over forty seconds ahead of second placed Abdellatif Meftah. After training in Africa, he returned to Europe for the 2010 European Athletics Championships. He took the 10,000 metres gold medal, overtaking Ayad Lamdassem with two laps to go and finishing the race unpressured in a time of 28:24.99. This was Farah's first major title and also the first European gold medal in the event for Great Britain. He then went on to win the 5000 m, beating Jesús España and becoming only the fifth man in the 66-year history of the European Championships to achieve the 5000 m/10,000 m double, and the first for 20 years, following in the footsteps of the Czech Emil Zátopek in 1950, Zdzislaw Krzyszkowiak of Poland in 1958, Finland's Juha Vaatainen in 1971 and Salvatore Antibo, of Italy, in 1990.

On 19 August 2010, at a Diamond League meeting in Zürich, Farah ran 5000 m in 12:57.94, breaking David Moorcroft's long-standing British record and becoming the first ever British athlete to run under 13 minutes.

In December 2010, Farah was named track-and-field athlete of the year by the British Olympic Association. He closed the year at the BO classic and just missed out on the 10,000 m title, losing to Imane Merga in a sprint finish by 0.2 seconds.

=== 2011–12: European and British records, and world medals ===
2011 was a successful year for Farah, beginning on 8 January at the Edinburgh Cross Country, where he defeated the top four finishers of that year's European Championships to take victory in the long race.

In February 2011, Farah announced that he would be relocating to Portland, Oregon to work with new couch Alberto Salazar, train alongside Galen Rupp, and avoid the attention of the British tabloids. On 19 February 2011 in Birmingham, England, Farah broke the European 5000 m indoor record with a time of 13:10.60, at the same time taking ten seconds off the 29-year-old British indoor record of Nick Rose. On 5 March 2011, he won gold in the 3000 metres at the European Indoor Championships. On 20 March, Farah also won the NYC Half Marathon in a time of 1:00:23, a new British record. He and training partner Galen Rupp had originally planned on running a 10,000 m race in New Zealand. However, after the race was cancelled due to the Christchurch earthquake and damage done to the track, they entered the half-marathon in New York.

On 3 June 2011, at a Diamond League meeting in Eugene, Oregon, Farah won the Prefontaine Classic's 10,000 m event in 26:46.57, setting a new British and European record. On 22 July 2011, at a Diamond League meeting in Monaco, he set a new British national record in the 5000 m with a time of 12:53.11. Farah edged out American Bernard Lagat to win the race.

In the 2011 World Championships in Athletics in Daegu, South Korea, Farah made a major breakthrough on the world stage by taking the silver medal in the 10,000 m and then the gold in the 5000 m. He became the first British man to win a World Championships medal over either distance. Farah had in fact been more strongly favoured to take the 10,000 m title, but was narrowly beaten in a last lap sprint by Ethiopian Ibrahim Jeilan. In the 5000 m, he overcame Lagat, beating him into second place. Following the race, Dave Moorcroft, former 5000-meter world record holder, hailed Farah as "the greatest male distance runner that Britain has ever seen".

At the European Championships in June 2012, he won the 5000 m. This then made Farah the first athlete to win this European title more than once.

=== 2012: Double Olympic champion ===
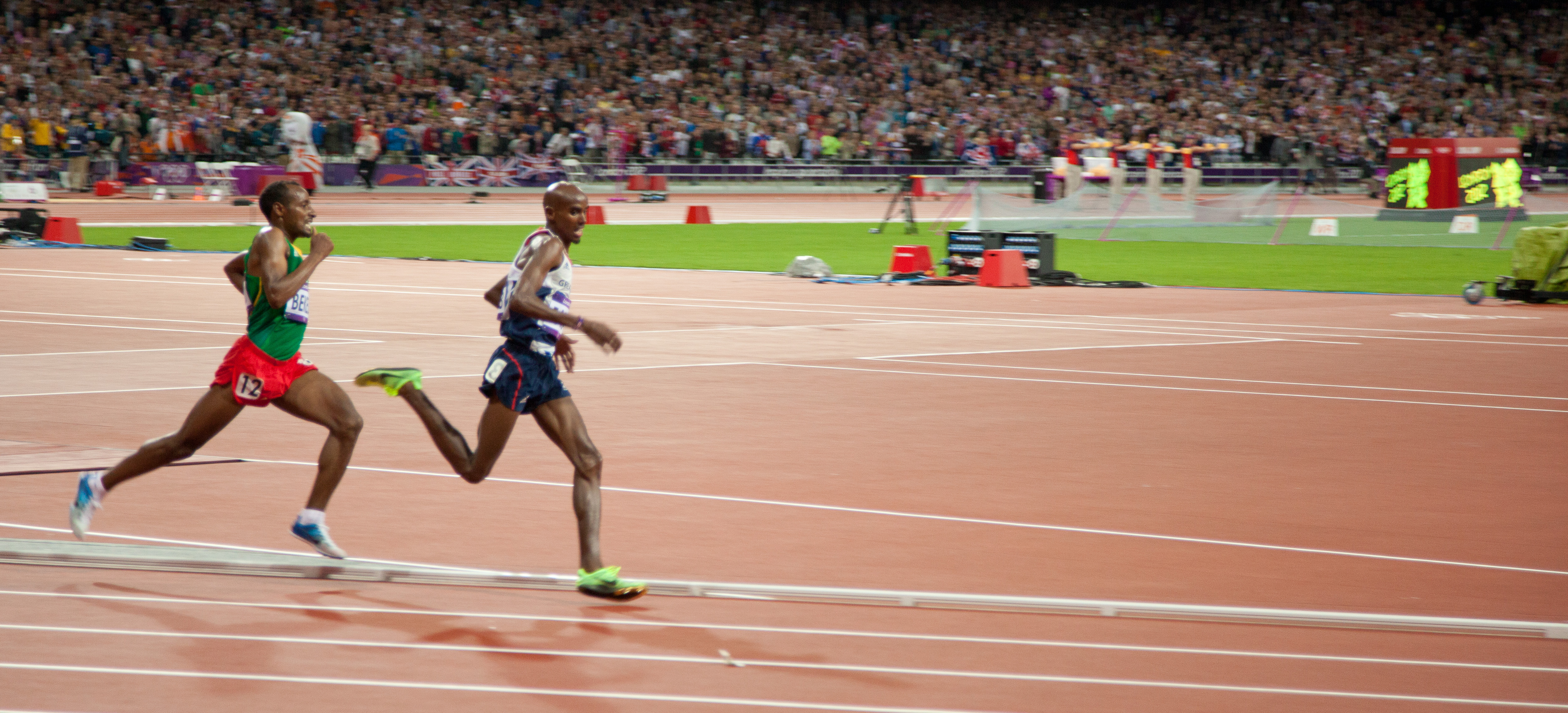
Farah on the way to his first Olympic gold medal during the 10,000 m event at the 2012 Summer Olympics

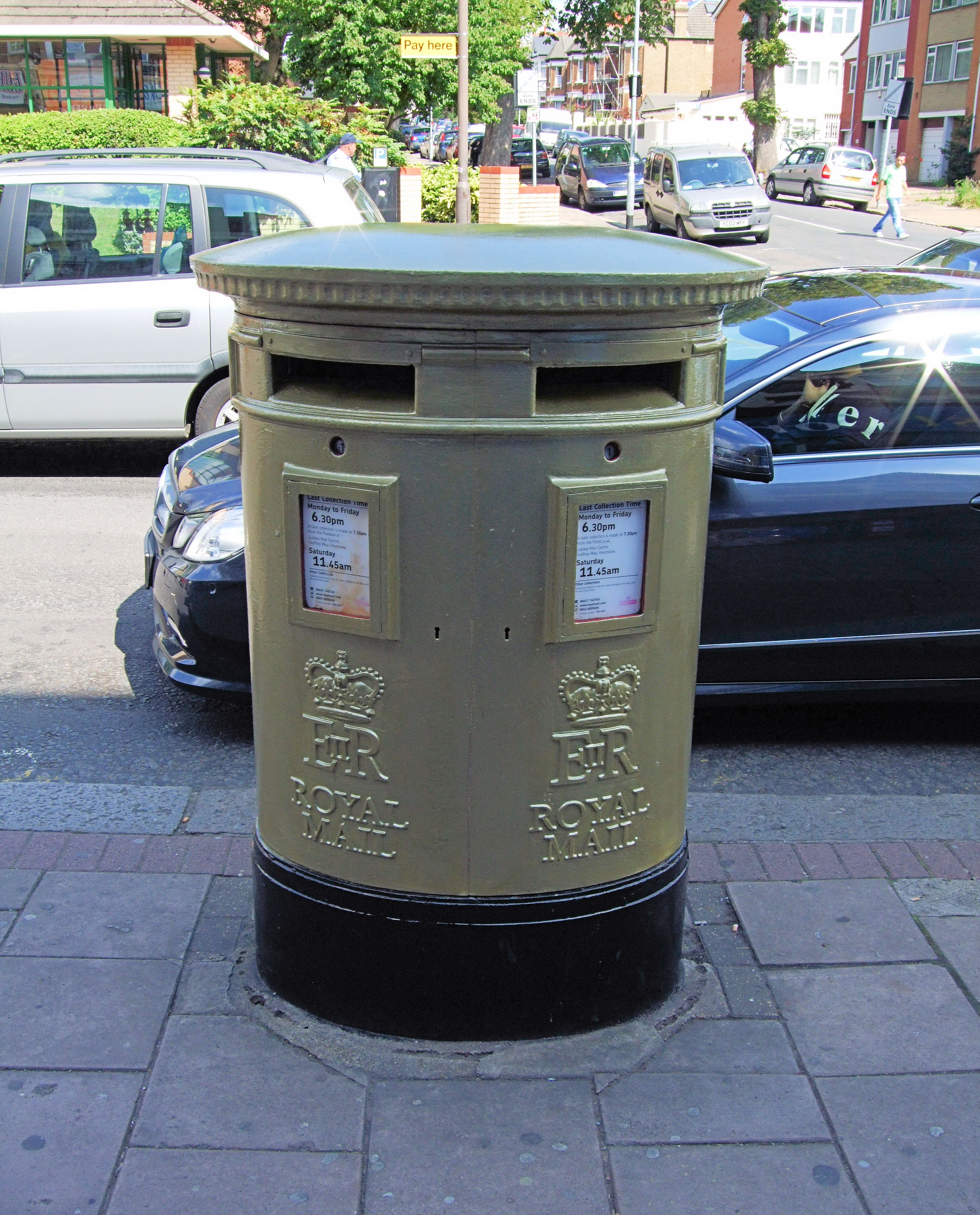
The post box on London Road, Isleworth, painted in honour of Farah as part of a scheme to celebrate Britain's 2012 Olympic gold medal winners

At the London 2012 Olympics, on 4 August, Farah won the 10,000 m gold in a time of 27:30.42. This was Great Britain's first Olympic gold medal in the 10,000 m, and came after two other gold medals for the country in the same athletics session. His training partner, Galen Rupp of the United States, took second place. At the time, both runners were a part of the Nike Oregon Project coached by Alberto Salazar. Farah stated that he would observe his Ramadan fast later in the year. On 11 August 2012, Farah made it a long-distance double, winning the 5000 metres in a time of 13:41.66. The noise from the crowd in the 5,000 m race was so loud it made the camera shake and distorted the photo-finish image. He dedicated the two golds to his twin daughters.

On 23 August 2012, Farah returned to the track at a Diamond League meet in Birmingham, where he capped off a winning season with another victory over a distance of two miles (3.2 km).

==== CBE ====
Following his 2012 successes, Farah was appointed Commander of the Order of the British Empire (CBE) in the 2013 New Year Honours for services to athletics. The move was met with anger by many in the general public, including erstwhile Minister of Sports Gerry Sutcliffe, who felt that Farah instead deserved a higher accolade. Farah's former physical education teacher Alan Watkinson similarly indicated that he was disappointed that Farah was not knighted and that the decision "discredits the system although it's still a fantastic achievement for Mo and well deserved." However, deputy Prime Minister Nick Clegg cited Farah's Olympic double gold win in his 2013 New Year's message and 2012 Autumn conference, and David Cameron in August 2013 expressed support for a knighthood for Mo Farah.

=== 2013: 1500 m record and world medals ===
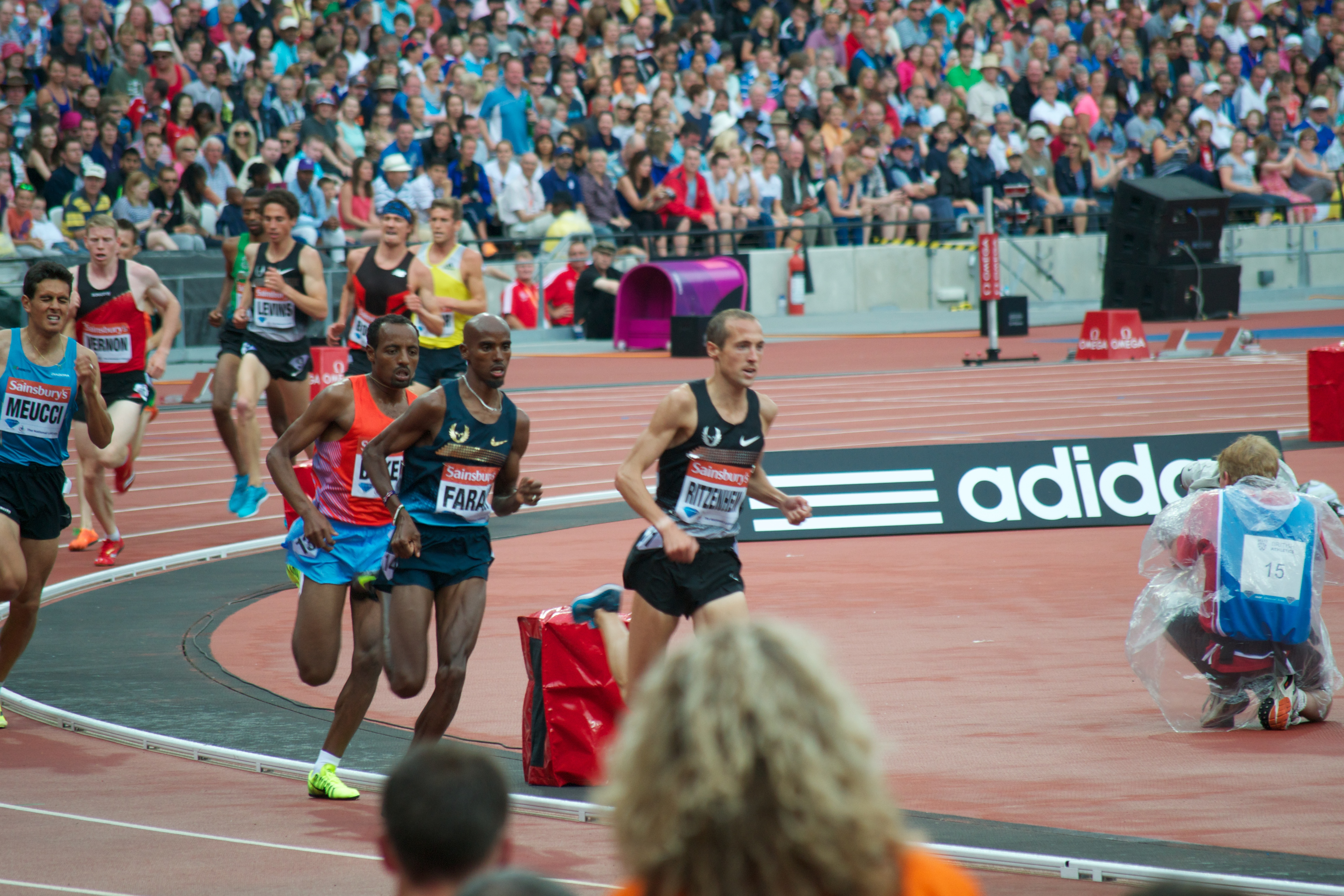
Farah during his gold medal victory in the men's 3,000 metres event at the 2013 London Grand Prix

On 19 July 2013, at the Herculis meeting in Monaco, Farah broke the European 1500 m record with a time of 3:28.81. The feat meant that he was the sixth fastest man ever over the distance, overtaking Steve Cram's 28-year-old British record and Fermín Cacho's 16-year-old European record. It also made Farah the seventh man, behind Saïd Aouita, Daniel Komen, Ali Saïdi-Sief, Hicham El Guerrouj, Augustine Kiprono Choge and Bernard Lagat to break both the 3:30 barrier in the 1500 metres and the 13-minute barrier in the 5000 metres, as well as the only athlete in history to run sub 3:30, sub 13-minute and sub 27-minute for 1500 metres, 5000 metres and 10,000 metres respectively. Additionally, he has a sub-1-hour run in the half-marathon. The following month, Farah won the London Diamond League Anniversary Games' 3000 metres event in a time of seven minutes and 36.85 seconds. He twice broke the national record in the half-marathon, first on 24 February in New Orleans, then broke his own record on 15 September in the Great North Run.

On 10 August 2013, Farah stayed in front of Ibrahim Jeilan to win the 10,000 m event at the World Championships in Moscow. The victory was his fourth global title. On 16 August 2013, Farah won the 5,000 m event, in the process becoming double world and Olympic champion. After this victory, BBC commentator Brendan Foster and Sebastian Coe called Farah 'Britain's greatest ever athlete'. Farah became only the second man in history to win long-distance titles at successive editions of the Olympics and World Championships, after Kenenisa Bekele's 2008–09 feat. He was the first British athlete to win two individual gold medals at a World Championships.

In December 2013, Farah was the second favourite, behind Wimbledon tennis champion Andy Murray, to become the BBC Sports Personality of the Year. When he was asked what drove him to keep pushing back the boundaries of athletic accomplishment, he noted sprinter Usain Bolt's record-breaking streak as a motivating example of what is possible for all dedicated athletes.

Farah was a finalist for the 2013 IAAF World Athlete of the Year award. In preparation for his marathon debut, he also extended his training schedule to 120 miles a week.

=== 2014: Double European gold in Zürich ===
Farah began 2014 preparing for the year's London Marathon, his first such run. He described running the event as a longstanding ambition of his, particularly to do so in London. Farah finished in eighth place in a time of 2:08.21. This was outside Steve Jones' GB record, but set a new English national record.

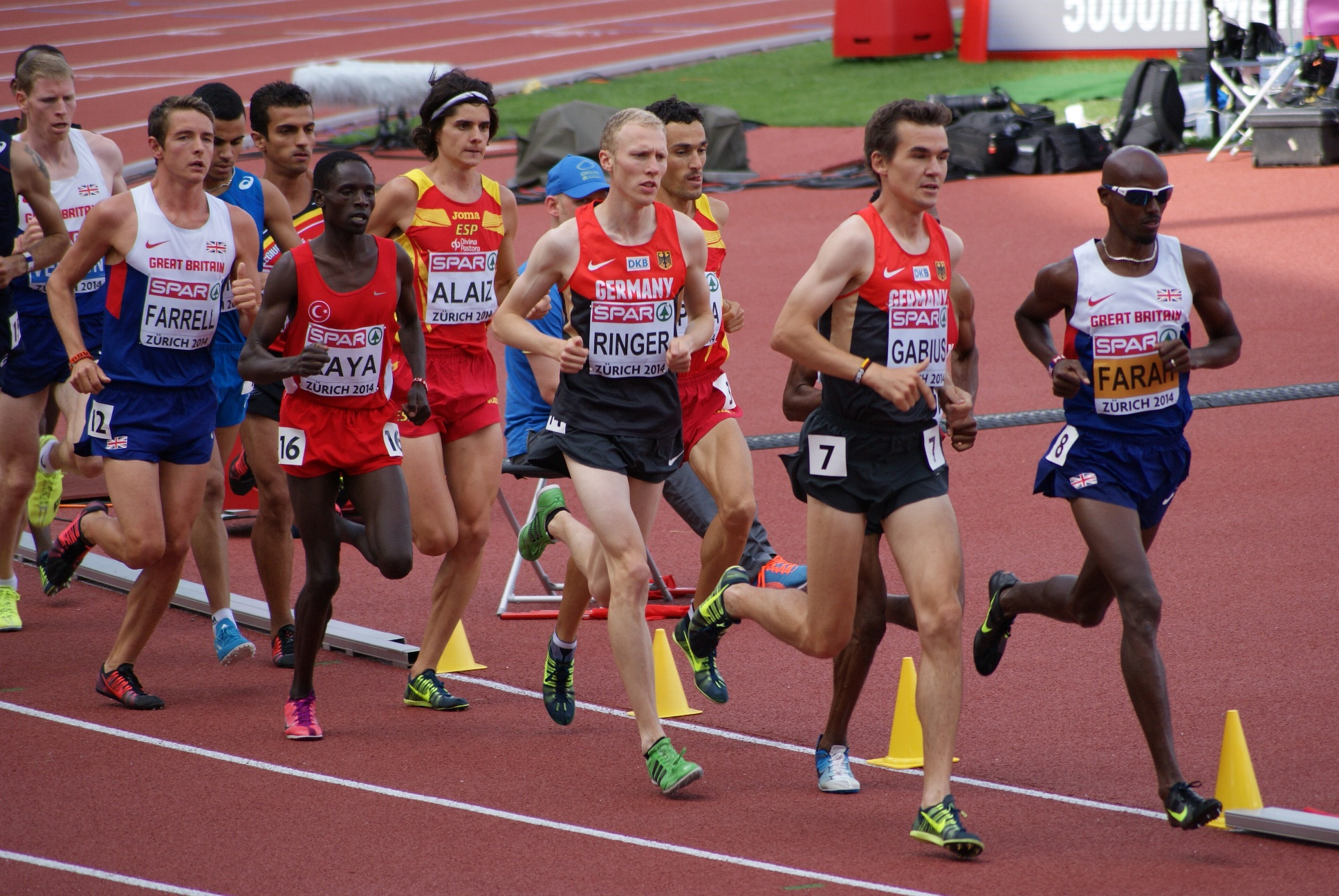
Farah on the way to victory in the 5000m men final of the 2014 European Athletics Championships in Zürich

Farah was due to compete at the 2014 Commonwealth Games in Glasgow. However, he withdrew due to illness from a stomach ailment and an infection caused from having a tooth removed. Farah later appeared in Zürich at the 2014 European Athletics Championships. He successfully defended his 5000 m title and won a gold in the 10,000 m, thus completing another major championship double. This made him the most successful individual in the history of the European Athletics Championships, with five titles to his name.

On 7 September 2014, Farah competed in the Great North Run, a British half marathon. He won the race with a personal best time of 1:00:00, exactly 1 hour.

=== 2015: World and European records ===
On 21 February 2015, Farah broke the indoor two-mile world record at the Birmingham Indoor Grand Prix. He ran an 8:03.4 to break Kenenisa Bekele's record. On 22 March, Farah broke the European record for half marathon in Lisbon. He ran a time of 59 minutes, 32 seconds, surpassing the record set 14 years previously by Spain's Fabián Roncero. He repeated his long-distance gold medal double at the 2015 World Championships in Athletics. His win in the 10,000 m made him the oldest World Championship winner in that event, at age 32.

=== 2016: Double-Double Olympic Golds at Rio ===
On 26 March, Farah received a bronze medal in the 2016 IAAF World Half Marathon Championships in Cardiff, finishing in 59:59, less than one second ahead of Abayneh Ayele. On 20 February, Farah won the Glasgow Indoor Grand Prix 3000m event. On 5 June 2016, Farah broke the 34-year-old British 3000 metre record set by Moorcroft by winning the Diamond League in Birmingham, a win he dedicated to the recently deceased boxer Muhammad Ali. In July 2016 Farah set the concurrent world-leading time in the 5000m in winning the Diamond League in London. He won the 10,000m at the Diamond League in Eugene, in a time of 26:53.71 which remained the second-fastest time in the world of the year.

On 13 August, Farah won a gold medal in the 10,000 metres at the Rio Olympics, making it the first time a Briton had won three athletic gold Olympic medals. After being accidentally clipped on the back of the heel by American Galen Rupp on the tenth lap he fell, but went on to win gold with the time of 27:05.17. Rupp slowed after Farah's fall to check his condition and finished in fifth place with a time of 27:08.92. In the final lap Farah battled Paul Tanui, who took the lead with 300 metres remaining. Farah edged him out with 100 metres to go. Tanui finished in second place with a time of 27:05.64.

On 20 August, Farah went on to win a second gold medal in the 5,000 metres at the Rio Olympics. Coming into the 31st Olympiad, Farah was trying to win gold medals in the 10,000 metres and 5,000 metres to double his success from the London Olympics. Farah held off the lead he had set and finished with a time of 13:03:30, making it only the second time someone has retained the 5000m and 10,000m Olympic titles, after Lasse Virén of Finland in 1972 and 1976. In September 2016, he won the Great North Run for a record third consecutive year.

In 2016, he was the fastest person from the European continent over two middle distance events and three long-distance events; the 1500 metres, 3000 metres, 5000 metres, 10,000 metres and the half-marathon respectively. His ninth global title, the 5000 m in Rio, made him surpass Kenenisa Bekele as the most frequent winner of gold in history for major long-distance events. He remained unbeaten in 2016 in the 3000 m as well as in six races over the 10,000 m and 5,000 m distances.

=== 2017: Tenth world title and track retirement ===
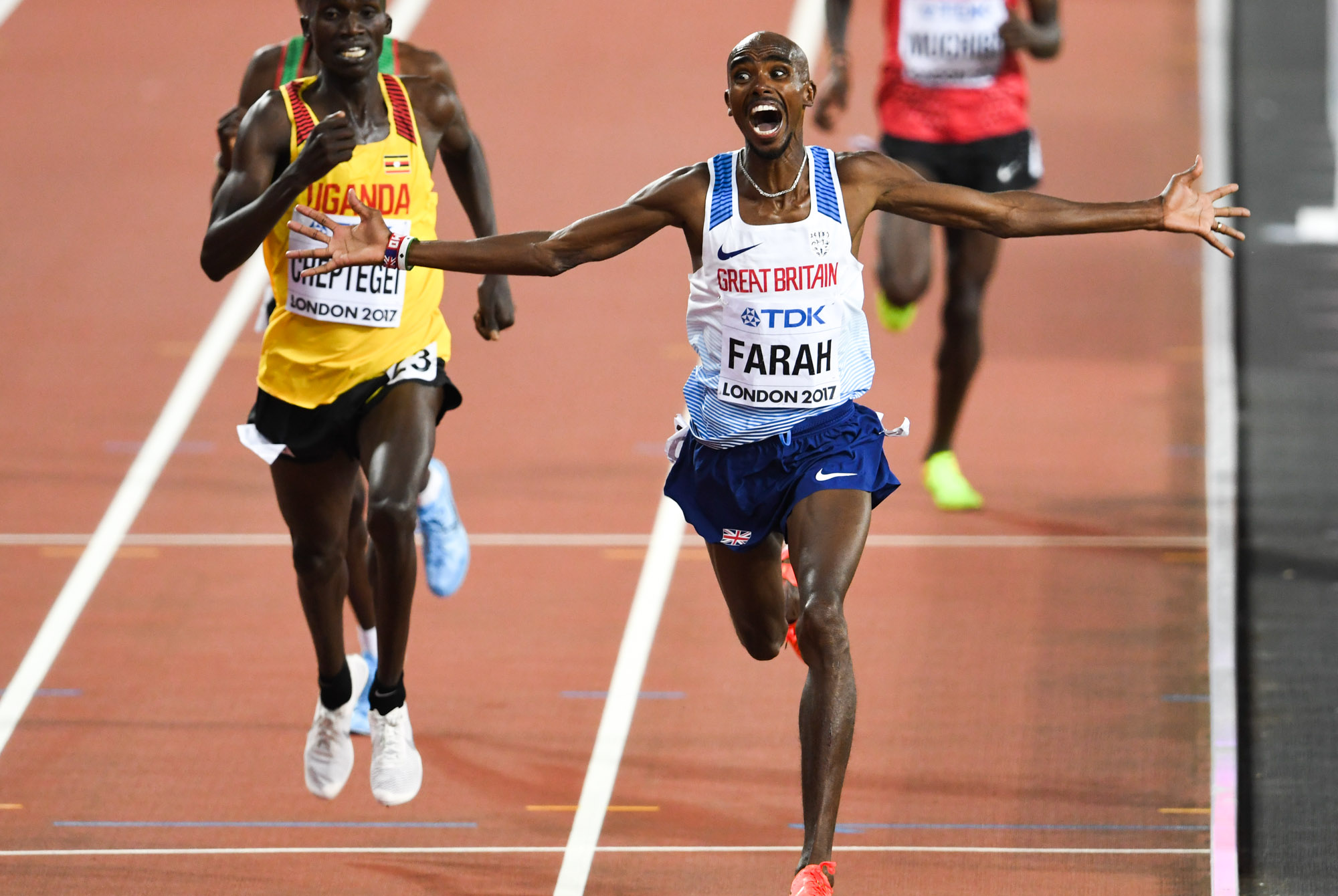
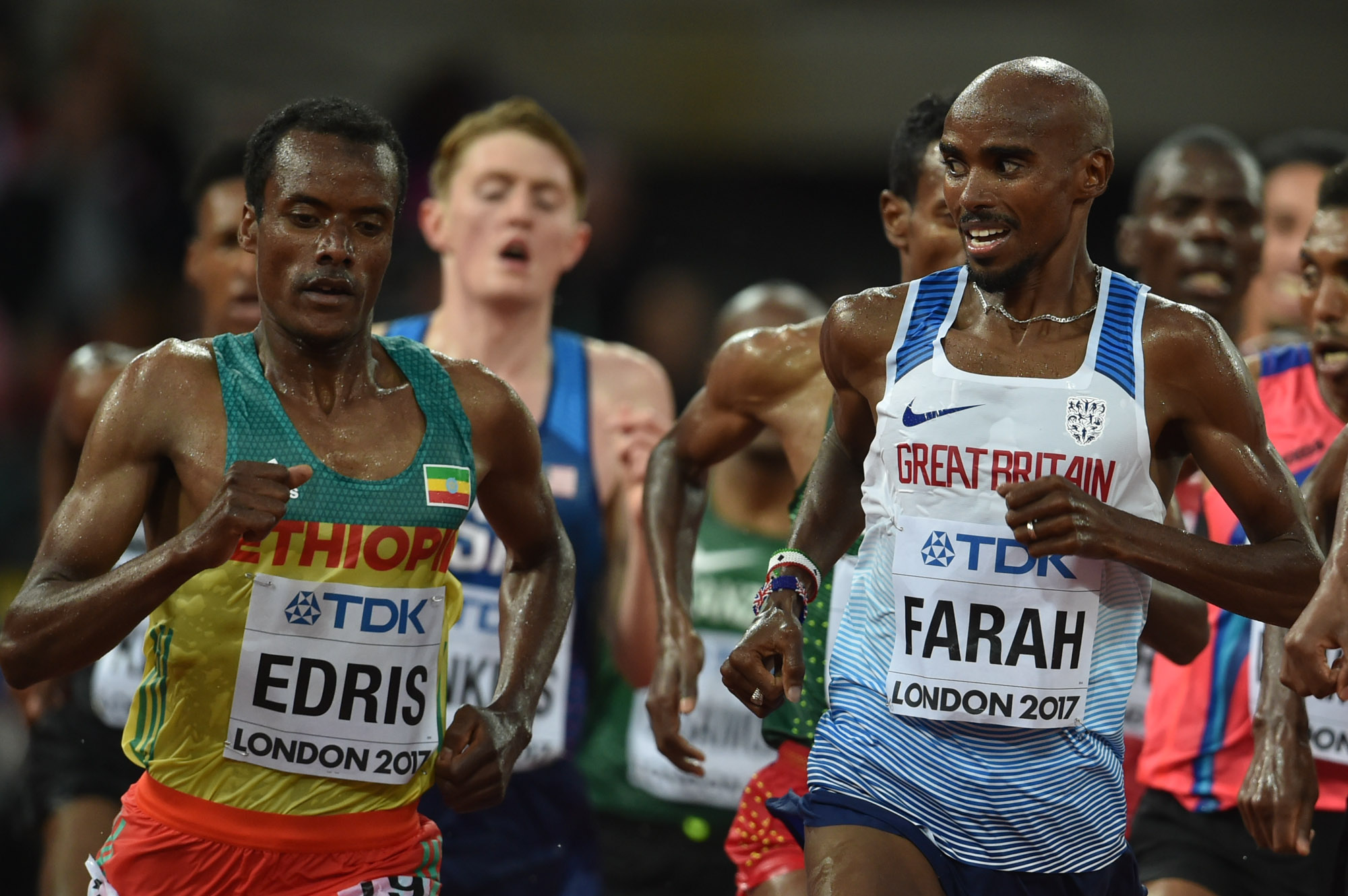
In his final World Championships appearance at London 2017, Farah (R) triumphed in the 10,000 m ahead of Joshua Cheptegei (L, left image) and took silver in the 5000 m behind Muktar Edris (L, right image).

Farah announced that he would switch from track events to the marathon after the 2017 World Championships in Athletics. He won the 10,000 m event, and came second in the 5,000m event after Ethiopia's Muktar Edris.

Farah won his final two track events, in the Diamond league, in Birmingham and Zurich. On 24 August 2017, he won his final 5,000 m in the Diamond league, finishing in 13:06.05, in a final sprint against Paul Chelimo and Muktar Edris just behind in 13:06.09.

On 20 August 2017, Farah again reiterated his decision to move to the marathon full-time, and caused headlines when he announced after running his last 10,000 m race on British soil at the Muller Grand Prix in Birmingham that he would never again run in a GB vest.

On 10 September 2017, Farah won the Great North Run for a record fourth consecutive time. He finished in 1:00:06, 6 seconds ahead of Jake Robertson.

On 31 October, Farah split from Alberto Salazar in order to be coached by Gary Lough, husband and former coach of Paula Radcliffe. Salazar stated that the split was mutual and he would be happy to advise Farah in the future.

=== Since 2018: Full-time marathon runner ===
In March 2018, in preparation for the London Marathon, Farah won the inaugural London Big Half Marathon, his first race in six months. On 22 April 2018, Farah came third in the London Marathon in a time of 2:06:22, comfortably beating the British record of 2:07:13 set by Steve Jones in 1985. On 9 September 2018 Farah won the Great North Run for a record-extending fifth consecutive time. At the Chicago Marathon Farah claimed his inaugural gold medal in the marathon distance and in the process set a new European record of 2 hours 5 minutes and 11 seconds, an improvement by 37 seconds.

=== 2019: Planning a track return ===
In February 2019, Farah announced he planned to run again in the London Big Half Marathon in March 2019. In an interview, he also stated that he is considering competing in the Tokyo Olympics in 2020, which, if confirmed, would mark his fourth Olympic games. As well as stating that this would depend on whether his wife and kids "let him", he reflected on his track retirement, saying:

"I was honest and said I was done with the track but part of me missed it. I feel like I can still win medals and do as well as I have over the years."

He has also confirmed that he may run in the 10,000 metres at the World Championships in Doha in late 2019, although this would depend on the result of the 2019 Big Half Marathon. This possibility was later confirmed by Neil Black, performance director of British Athletics, who has said that Farah had received financial backing from the National Lottery in anticipation for both his participation in the Championships, as well as for the Tokyo Olympics.

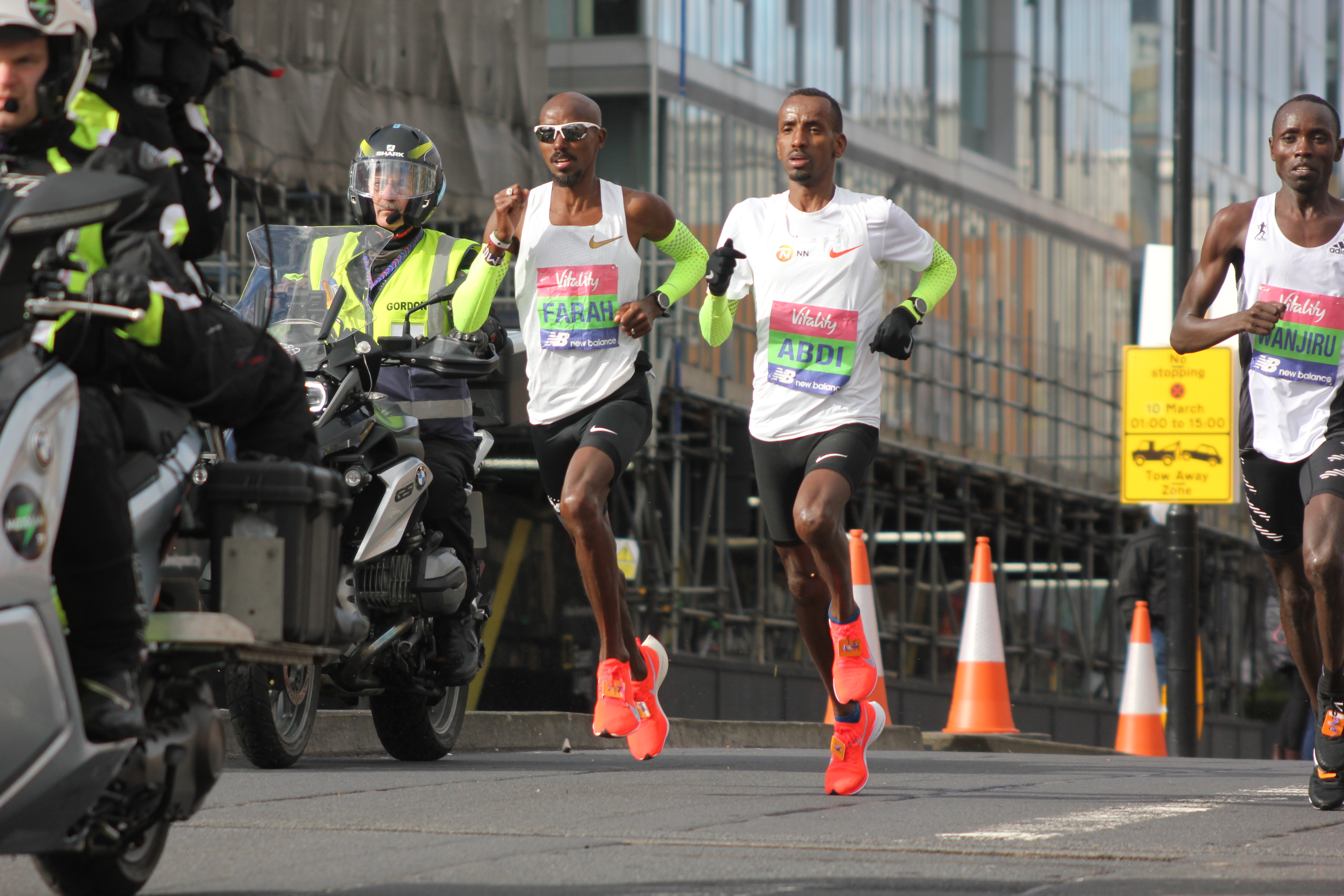
Mo Farah (left), Bashir Abdi and Daniel Wanjiru compete in the 2019 London Half Marathon – finishing in that order.

On 10 March 2019, Farah won his second London Big Half Marathon, and again hinted at running the 10,000 m at the World Championships in October 2019. In April, Farah finished in fifth place in the 2019 London Marathon in 2:05:39.

On 8 September 2019, Farah won the 2019 Great North Run for a record sixth consecutive time in a new Personal best of 59:07.

On 29 November 2019, Farah announced via his YouTube channel, his plan to return to the track to defend his 10,000 m Olympic title at the Tokyo 2020 Olympic Games. Farah stated he would put his marathon career on hold while he returned to track-oriented training.

=== 2020 ===
In August 2020, Farah won the inaugural Antrim Coast Half Marathon, with a time of 1 hr 00 min 27 sec.

On 4 September 2020, Farah set the men's all-time record for the one hour run at the 2020 Diamond League meeting in Brussels, Belgium, covering 21,330 metres (13.25 miles), breaking Haile Gebrselassie's record of 21,285 metres set at Ostrava, Czech Republic, on 27 June 2007.

=== 2021 ===
Farah spent several weeks at altitude training in Ethiopia, before competing at the Djibouti International Half Marathon. Farah won the race in a time of 1:03:07. After training in Flagstaff, United States, Farah returned to the United Kingdom where, at the 2021 European 10,000 m Cup in Birmingham, United Kingdom, he raced his first track 10,000 m since the World Championships in 2017. He finished in eighth place in a time of 27:50.64, this result broke his undefeated streak in the 10,000 m from 2011 to 2021. Farah later said he was dealing with a foot/ankle injury.

On 25 June 2021, Farah failed to qualify for the 2020 Tokyo Olympic Games managing to run only a 27:47.04 for the 10,000 m at the Manchester Regional Arena, despite this time being a stadium record. The cut-off time for Olympic Qualification of the 10,000 m stands at 27:28.00, leaving Farah 19 seconds off the pace. When asked whether this would lead to the end of his distinguished career, he said "It's a tough one. If I can't compete with the best I'm not just going there to finish in a final. Tonight shows it's not good enough."

=== 2023: Retirement ===
Farah began retirement after his last competitive race in the Great North Run on 10 September 2023.

== Doping suspicion, Fancy Bears and Salazar ==
=== Missed doping tests ===
Farah missed doping tests in 2010 and 2011. At the time of the second test, Farah claimed that he was in his bedroom and could not hear his doorbell. He was spared from being banned for evading a test because the testers believed his explanation.

=== Fancy Bears leak ===
In July 2017, the Russian hacking group Fancy Bears leaked a database from International Association of Athletics Federations that purportedly showed that Farah had been suspected of doping in 2016. Previous Fancy Bears leaks are reported to have included false or altered documents. The leaked report said that an IAAF staff member had regarded Farah's blood values as suspicious, and had written next to his name: "Likely doping; passport suspicious: further data is required". However, a later leaked spreadsheet said his records had been "now flagged as normal with the last sample".

=== Salazar ban ===
In October 2019, Mo Farah's former coach Alberto Salazar and Nike Oregon Project doctor Jeffrey Stuart Brown both received four-year bans from athletics for the trafficking of testosterone, the prohibited use of L-carnitine, and tampering with doping controls. The investigation was the subject of an episode of BBC's Panorama in which it was revealed Farah repeatedly denied having L-carnitine injection prior to the 2014 London Marathon to the United States Anti-Doping Agency in 2015, but changed his account of what happened shortly afterwards.

=== Jama Aden ===
In 2020 Farah acknowledged that he had lied about knowing Jama Aden, who was arrested by Spanish police on suspicion of doping offences. Farah had been photographed with Aden several times.

== "Mobot" ==
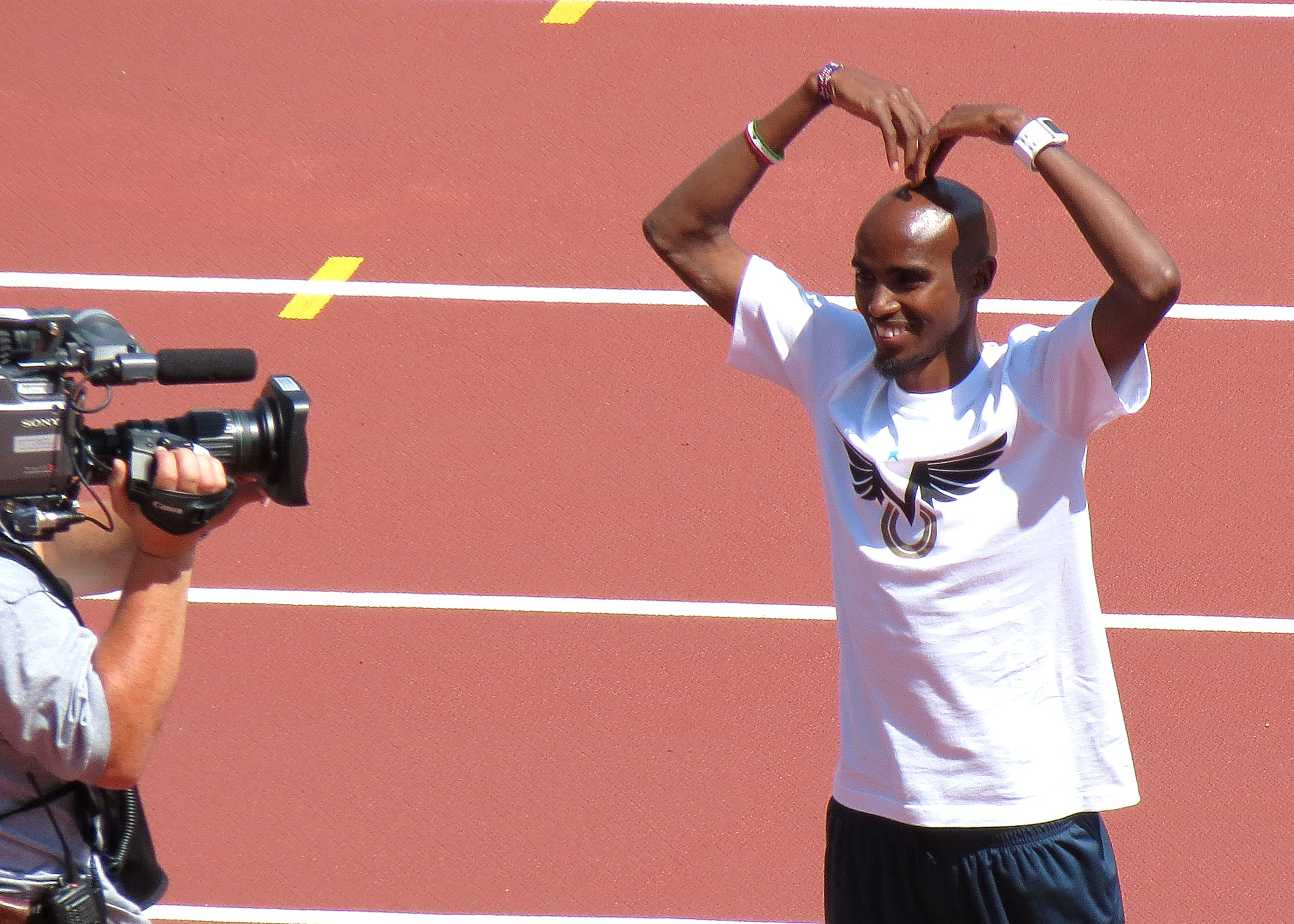
Mo Farah with his "Mobot" signature pose at the 2013 London Anniversary Games

Farah often celebrated victories with a celebration dance known as the "Mobot". He adopted the move following an appearance in May 2012 opposite sports presenter Clare Balding, on the panel game show A League of Their Own. The host James Corden suggested to the panelists that they should think of a new dance to mark Farah's winning celebration, and Balding came up with the "M" gesture. She said it was meant to represent the "M" in "Mo" and was inspired by the dance to "YMCA" by the Village People. Corden himself then named it as the "Mobot". A robot was named "Mobot" at a university research exhibition, in honour of Farah's celebration. Farah has since used the pose as part of a charity to raise funds for his foundation. Virgin Media has promised to donate £2 for every YouTube video that is uploaded with someone doing the mobot. Farah often uses the sign-off Shabba in online postings.

== Personal life ==
=== Family and interests ===
Farah lived in London, England until 2026. In July 2022, Farah revealed his birth identity as Hussein Abdi Kahin. When he was four years old, his father was killed by a stray mortar round, during the Isaaq Genocide. Aged 8, Farah and his twin, Hassan, were sent to live with his uncle in Djibouti. Shortly after, Farah says he was brought to the UK by a woman he did not know, and told to use the name Mohamed Farah, taken from another child. Once in London, he was forced to work for her and her family, and prevented from contacting his own. Aged 12, Farah was allowed to start school and he later confided in his PE teacher, who contacted social services who arranged for Farah to be fostered by another family. His teacher later helped him apply for British citizenship. As an adult, Farah has made contact with his birth family, and his mother and two brothers live on a farm in Somaliland. Prior to these revelations, Farah had said that he had been separated from his twin Hassan aged eight when the family moved to join their father, who was working and studying in the UK; Hassan was unwell and unable to travel so stayed in Djibouti, but when his father returned the family Hassan was living with had moved and could not be found for 12 years.

In April 2010, Farah married his longtime girlfriend Tania Nell in Richmond, London. Other athletes at the wedding included Paula Radcliffe, Steve Cram, Hayley Yelling, Jo Pavey, Mustafa Mohamed and Scott Overall, who was an usher. Farah has a stepdaughter named Rihanna from this relationship. He and his wife have twin daughters called Aisha and Amani, born in August 2012. In 2015, Farah and Nell had a son called Hussein.

From 2011 to 2017, Farah lived with his family in Portland, Oregon, US so that he could train full-time with the Nike Oregon Project. At the end of 2017, he cut ties with his coach Alberto Salazar and decided to return to London. His statement said "Tania and I realised how much we have missed spending time with our friends and family and the kids are so happy here, too. We want the kids to grow up in the UK. It's the right thing to do for my family.

Farah is a Muslim, and is an active supporter of the Muslim Writers Awards. Islam is an important part of his preparation: "I normally pray before a race, I read dua [Islamic prayers or invocations], think about how hard I've worked and just go for it." He notes that "the Qur'an says that you must work hard in whatever you do, so I work hard in training and that's got a lot to do with being successful. [It] doesn't just come overnight, you've got to train for it and believe in yourself; that's the most important thing." An RISSC publication named Farah as among the 500 most influential Muslims in the world in 2013.

In 2026, Farah and his family moved to Qatar. Farah stated, "I’ve always said that when I do retire, I want to... live in a Muslim country, enjoy myself, let my kids grow up knowing about the Deen, teach about the Deen, all that stuff".

Farah is also a fan of Arsenal F.C., and has trained with its first team squad. In October 2013, he launched a book titled Mo Farah, Twin Ambitions: My autobiography.

Farah has a large following on social media. This includes roughly 1.5 million followers on Twitter, 1.1 million on Facebook and 1.1 million on Instagram. In 2013, he was the top-ranked query for a sportsperson on the search engine Microsoft UK Bing who was not a footballer.

=== Philanthropy ===
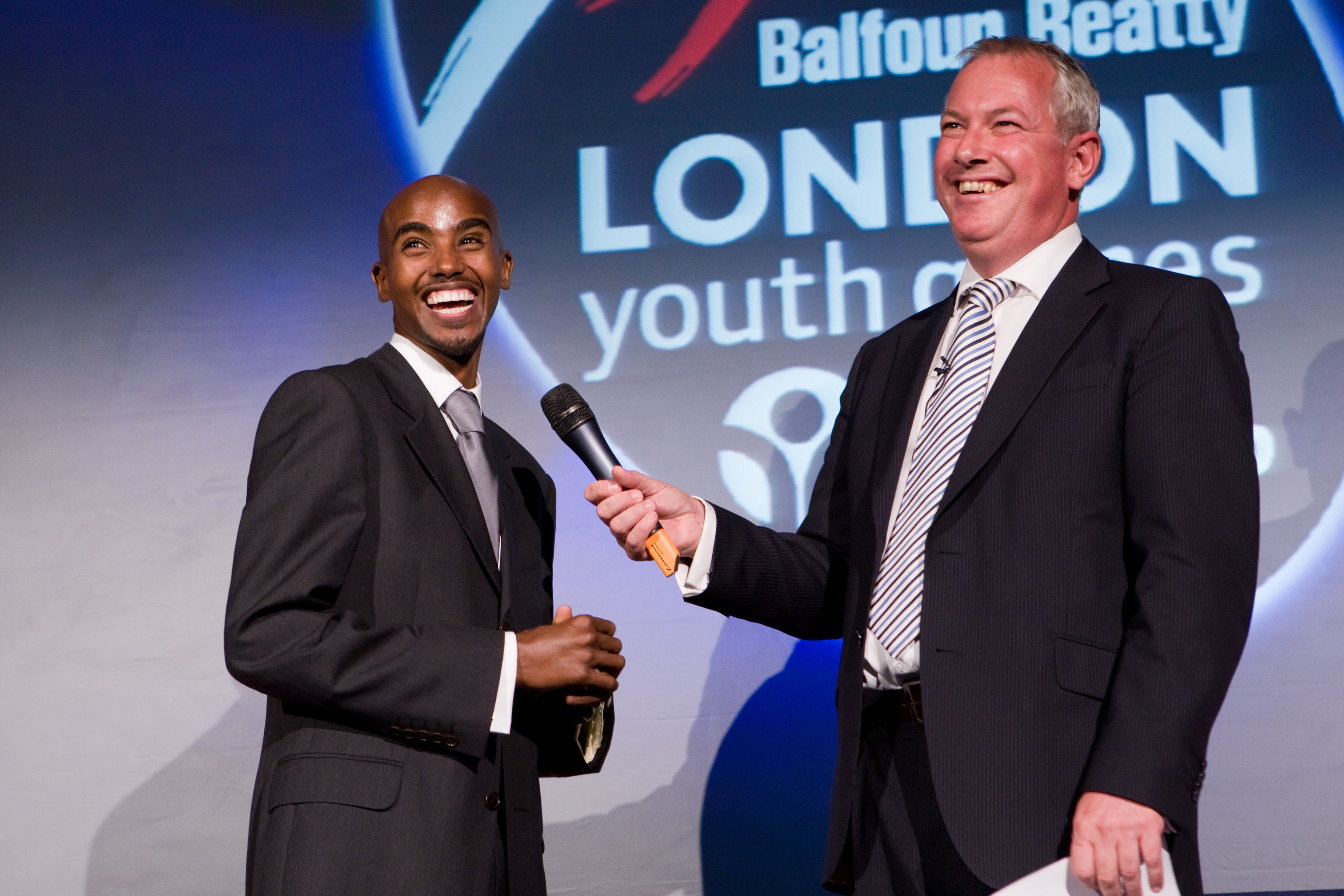
Farah at the 2010 London Youth Games Hall of Fame and Awards Evening

Farah is involved in various philanthropic initiatives, launching the Mo Farah Foundation after a trip to Somalia in 2011. The following year, he participated in ITV's The Cube and won £250,000 for his foundation, becoming the only person to win the top prize on the show. Along with other high-profile athletes, Farah later took part in the 2012 Olympic hunger summit at 10 Downing Street hosted by the Prime Minister, David Cameron, part of a series of international efforts which have sought to respond to the return of hunger as a global issue.

Olympic memorabilia featuring and signed by Farah has also been auctioned off to raise funds for the London Organising Committee of the Olympic and Paralympic Games (LOCOG). In 2013, he joined legislators and activists in a campaign urging Barclays Bank to repeal its decision to withdraw from the UK remittance market. Farah often used money transfer operators to send remittances to family, and some of the world's largest organisations and charities, including the UN and his own foundation, likewise paid staff and channelled funds through these services. In March 2013, Farah, singer Robbie Williams, and a number of other celebrities also urged the Chancellor, George Osborne to clamp down on global corporations that avoid paying taxes in poor countries in which they operate. He has also expressed support for research into brain tumours.

On 7 August 2017, Farah became a global ambassador for Marathon Kids.

=== Endorsements, advertising and sponsorships ===
Farah has endorsement deals with companies including PACE Sports Management, Nike, Lucozade, Quorn, Bupa and Virgin Media. His work with Nike Inc. includes marketing of clothing and shoes. In order to preserve his earnings after taxes, Farah also applied in 2013 to have his main place of residence changed to Portland, where he spends most of the year training.

In December 2013, Farah signed a marketing deal with Quorn, part of a multimillion-pound campaign aimed at doubling the firm's sales. He led television advertisements for Quorn's vegetarian forms of protein, with the campaign scheduled to last throughout the following year.

=== Travel security ===
In 2012–2013, Farah intimated that he had been stopped a number of times by U.S. Customs officials under suspicion of being a terrorist, which he attributed to confusion between his full name "Mohamed" and a computerised check-in process. On one occasion after the 2012 Olympics, he said that he had attempted to prove his identity by showing his Olympic gold medals to customs officials, but that this was not accepted.

After U.S. President Donald Trump signed an executive order temporarily suspending the immigration of Somali-born U.S. permanent residents, Farah made a statement on his Facebook account stating that "I will have to tell my children that Daddy might not be able to come home."

In March 2018, Farah posted a video on Instagram depicting what he alleges to be racial harassment at Munich Airport.

=== Television ===
In July 2012, Farah successfully completed the final game of The Cube on an episode of a 2012 celebrity series in which British gold medallist athletes competed for charity.

In November 2020, it was announced that Farah would take part in the twentieth series of I'm a Celebrity...Get Me Out of Here. He became the eighth celebrity to be eliminated on 2 December 2020 alongside AJ Pritchard.

In July 2022, the BBC documentary The Real Mo Farah portrayed a new account of Farah's childhood. It follows Farah with his wife and son Hussein as he investigates his past, reuniting with his Somali family and the woman who raised him after he escaped domestic servitude. It received critical acclaim.

In November 2022, it was announced that Farah would take part in the Taskmaster "New Year Treat III". Farah won the episode.

In 2026, he was one of the 'All Stars' contestants in series 2 of I'm a Celebrity... South Africa, aired on ITV in April 2026. he finished 2nd to Adam Thomas 1st, and Harry Redknapp was 3rd.

== Awards and honours ==
=== Athletics ===
- 2006 British Athletics Writers' Association Award
- 2010 British Athletics Writers' Association Award
- 2010 Best Senior Athlete of 2010 (UK Aviva Athletics Awards)
- 2010 London Youth Games Hall of Fame
- 2011 British Athletics Writers' Association Award
- 2011 European Athlete of the Year
- 2011 BBC Sports Personality of the Year Award, 3rd place
- 2011 Athletics Weekly International Male Athlete
- 2012 British Athletics Writers' Association Award
- 2012 European Athlete of the Year
- 2012 Laureus World Sports Award for Breakthrough of the Year, nominee
- 2012 Athletics Weekly International Male Athlete
- 2013 IAAF World Athlete of the Year, finalist
- 2013 British Athletics Writers' Association Award
- 2013 Athletics Weekly International Male Athlete
- 2013 Laureus World Sports Award for Sportsman of the Year, nominee
- 2013 British Olympic Association Olympic athlete of the year
- 2013 AIPS Europe Sportsmen of the Year – Frank Taylor Trophy
- 2013 Rodale, Inc., Running Times – Runner of the Year
- 2014 Jesse Owens International Athlete Trophy, nominee
- 2014 Laureus World Sports Award for Sportsman of the Year, nominee
- 2014 sack race world record
- 2015 World Record, 2-mile run, Birmingham
- Runners World top 50 influential individuals in running
- LetsRun.com number 1 in 2015 year-end world ranking for long-distance runners
- 2015 fastest men's 10,000-metre runner
- 2016 BAWA Athlete of the Year
- 2016 British Athletics Supporters Club athlete of the year
- 2016 Athletics Weekly International Male Athlete of the Year, ahead of Usain Bolt
- 2016 Athletics Weekly British Male Athlete of the Year
- 2017 Sportsman of the Year at the Lycamobile British Ethnic Diversity Sports Awards (BEDSAs)
- 2017 BBC Sports Personality of the Year Award, 1st place

=== Other ===
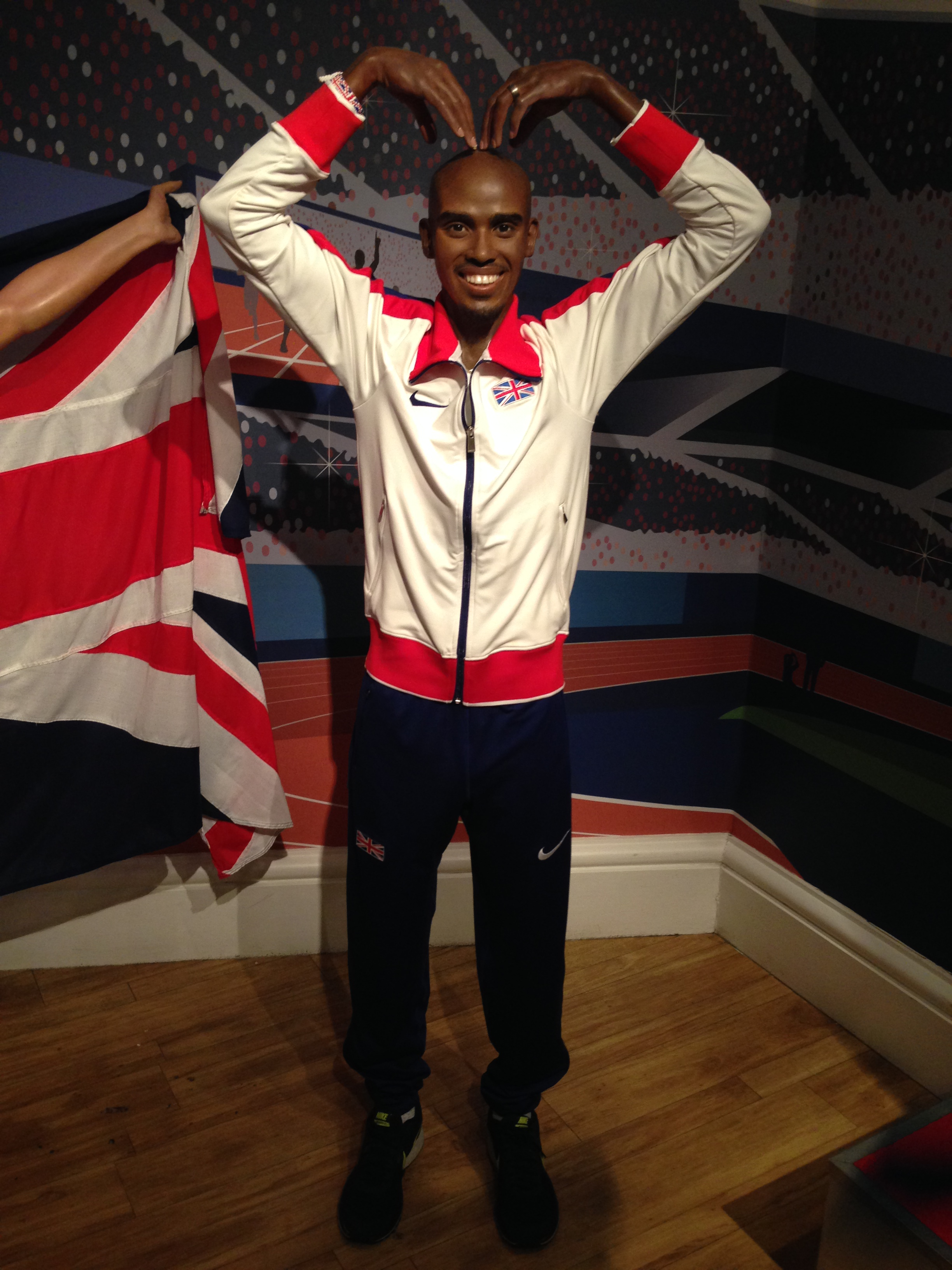
Wax statue of Farah at Madame Tussauds, London

- 2012: Winner of the British game show The Cube. Farah is the only person who won the top prize on the UK version of the show.
- 2013: Commander of the Most Excellent Order of the British Empire (CBE)
- 2013: Premier Inn Celebrity Dad of The Year
- 2013: Best at Sport award at the British Muslim Awards
- 6th place, Freuds Heroes Index
- 2014: World's 100 Most Powerful Arabs, Arabian Business
- 2015: Clothing firm Rohan's eighth greatest Briton of all time
- 2015: Evening Standard's top 25 most influential Londoners
- 2016: Sports Relief highest polled sporting London hero with 27% of the vote
- 2016: Nickelodeon Kids' Choice Award for Inspirational Athlete.
- 2016: Fifth most powerful Black Briton, on tenth anniversary of Powerlist, African and Caribbean heritage listing
- 2017: created a Knight Bachelor for services to Athletics.
- Awarded OLY post nominal title from World Olympians Association
- 2023: Winner of The Taskmaster 'New Year Treat III'
- 2025: Awarded an honorary degree from the University of Oxford.

== National titles ==
- British Athletics Championships
  - 5000 metres: 2007, 2011
- British Indoor Athletics Championships
  - 3000 metres: 2007
- British 10K Championships
  - 10K run: 2011, 2012
- British Marathon Championships
  - Marathon: 2014

== Race results ==
All information from Association of Road Racing Statisticians

=== International competitions ===
Representing Great Britain & England
Year	Competition	Venue	Position	Event	Notes
1999	World Youth Championships	Bydgoszcz, Poland	6th	3000 m	8:21.25
1999	European Cross Country Championships	Velenje, Slovenia	5th	Junior individual	23:18
1999	European Cross Country Championships	Velenje, Slovenia	1st	Junior team	26 pts
2000	World Cross Country Championships	Vilamoura, Portugal	25th	Junior individual	24:37
2000	World Cross Country Championships	Vilamoura, Portugal	12th	Junior team	216 pts
2000	World Junior Championships	Santiago, Chile	10th	5000 m	14:12.21
2000	European Cross Country Championships	Malmö, Sweden	7th	Junior individual	19:12
2000	European Cross Country Championships	Malmö, Sweden	2nd	Junior team	25 pts
2001	World Cross Country Championships	Ostend, Belgium	59th	Junior individual	28:06
2001	World Cross Country Championships	Ostend, Belgium	15th	Junior team	332 pts
2001	European Junior Championships	Grosseto, Italy	1st	5000 m	14:09.91
2001	European Cross Country Championships	Thun, Switzerland	2nd	Junior individual	19:38
2001	European Cross Country Championships	Thun, Switzerland	1st	Junior team	54 pts
2003	World Cross Country Championships	Lausanne, Switzerland	74th	Short race	12:13
2003	European U23 Championships	Bydgoszcz, Poland	2nd	5000 m	13:58.88
2005	European Indoor Championships	Madrid, Spain	6th	3000 m	7:54.08
2005	World Cross Country Championships	Saint-Galmier, France	37th	Senior race	37:50
2005	World Cross Country Championships	Saint-Galmier, France	17th	Senior team	308 pts
2005	European Cup	Florence, Italy	2nd	3000 m	8:17.28
2005	European U23 Championships	Erfurt, Germany	2nd	5000 m	14:10.96
2005	European Cross Country Championships	Tilburg, Netherlands	21st	Senior race	27:57
2005	European Cross Country Championships	Tilburg, Netherlands	7th	Senior team	129 pts
2006	Commonwealth Games	Melbourne, Australia	9th	5000 m	13:40.53
2006	World Cross Country Championships	Fukuoka, Japan	40th	Short race	11:27
2006	World Cross Country Championships	Fukuoka, Japan	14th	Short race team	253 pts
2006	European Cup	Málaga, Spain	2nd	3000 m	8:27.91
2006	European Athletics Championships	Gothenburg, Sweden	2nd	5000 m	13:44.79
2006	European Cross Country Championships	San Giorgio su Legnano, Italy	1st	Senior race	27:56
2006	European Cross Country Championships	San Giorgio su Legnano, Italy	4th	Senior team	79 pts
2007	European Indoor Championships	Birmingham, United Kingdom	5th	3000 m	8:03.50
2007	World Cross Country Championships	Mombasa, Kenya	11th	Senior race	37:31
2007	World Cross Country Championships	Mombasa, Kenya	8th	Senior team	380 pts
2007	World Championships	Osaka, Japan	6th	5000 m	13:47.54
2007	World Athletics Final	Stuttgart, Germany	3rd	3000 m	7:49.89
2008	World Indoor Championships	Valencia, Spain	6th	3000 m	7:55.08
2008	European Cup	Annecy, France	1st	5000 m	13:44.07
2008	Olympic Games	Beijing, China	17th (h)	5000 m	13:50.95
2008	European Cross Country Championships	Brussels, Belgium	2nd	Senior race	30:57
2008	European Cross Country Championships	Brussels, Belgium	3rd	Senior team	54 pts
2009	European Indoor Championships	Turin, Italy	1st	3000 m	7:40.17 CR
2009	European Team Championships	Leiria, Portugal	1st	5000 m	13:43.01
2009	World Championships	Berlin, Germany	7th	5000 m	13:19.69
2009	European Cross Country Championships	Dublin, Ireland	2nd	Senior race	31:02
2009	European Cross Country Championships	Dublin, Ireland	2nd	54 pts	Senior team
2010	World Cross Country Championships	Bydgoszcz, Poland	20th	Senior race	34:09
2010	World Cross Country Championships	Bydgoszcz, Poland	14th	Senior team	230 pts
2010	European Team Championships	Bergen, Norway	1st	5000 m	13:46.93
2010	European Championships	Barcelona, Spain	1st	5000 m	13:31.18
2010	European Championships	Barcelona, Spain	1st	10,000 m	28:24.99
2011	European Indoor Championships	Paris, France	1st	3000 m	7:53.00
2011	World Championships	Daegu, South Korea	1st	5000 m	13:23.36
2011	World Championships	Daegu, South Korea	2nd	10,000 m	27:14.07
2012	World Indoor Championships	Istanbul, Turkey	4th	3000 m	7:41.79
2012	European Championships	Helsinki, Finland	1st	5000 m	13:29.91
2012	Olympic Games	London, United Kingdom	1st	5000 m	13:41.66
2012	Olympic Games	London, United Kingdom	1st	10,000 m	27:30.42
2013	European Team Championships	Gateshead, United Kingdom	1st	5000 m	14:10.00
2013	World Championships	Moscow, Russia	1st	5000 m	13:26.98
2013	World Championships	Moscow, Russia	1st	10,000 m	27:21.71
2014	European Championships	Zürich, Switzerland	1st	5000 m	14:05.82
2014	European Championships	Zürich, Switzerland	1st	10,000 m	28:08.11
2015	World Championships	Beijing, China	1st	5000 m	13:50.38
2015	World Championships	Beijing, China	1st	10,000 m	27:01.13
2016	World Half Marathon Championships	Cardiff, United Kingdom	3rd	Individual	59:59
2016	Olympic Games	Rio de Janeiro, Brazil	1st	5000 m	13:03.30
2016	Olympic Games	Rio de Janeiro, Brazil	1st	10,000 m	27:05.17
2017	World Championships	London, United Kingdom	2nd	5000 m	13:33.22
2017	World Championships	London, United Kingdom	1st	10,000 m	26:49.51

=== Circuit wins ===
- Diamond League
  - London Grand Prix: 2009 (5000 m), 2011 (3000 m), 2013 (3000 m), 2015 (3000 m)
  - Herculis: 2011 (5000 m)
  - Birmingham: 2011 (5000 m), 2012 (2 miles), 2013 (5000 m), 2014 (2 miles), 2016 (3000 m), 2017 (3000 m)
  - Prefontaine Classic: 2011, 2015, 2016 (10,000 m)
  - Athletissima: 2015 (5000 m)
  - Weltklasse Zürich: 2017 (5000 m)
- Road
  - Great South Run: 2009
  - New York City Half Marathon: 2011
  - Rock 'n' Roll Mardi Gras Half Marathon: 2013
  - Great North Run: 2014, 2015, 2016, 2017, 2018, 2019
  - Lisbon Half Marathon: 2015
  - Chicago Marathon: 2018
  - Antrim Coast Half Marathon: 2020
- Cross country
  - Cross de L'Acier: 2006
  - Great Edinburgh International Cross Country: 2011

=== Personal bests ===
Category	Event	Time	Date	Place
Outdoor	100 m	12.98	2012	Bath
Outdoor	800 m	1:48.69	5 August 2003	Eton
Outdoor	1500 m	3:28.81 NR	19 July 2013	Monaco
Outdoor	One mile	3:56.49	6 August 2005	London
Outdoor	2000 m	5:06.34	9 March 2006	Melbourne
Outdoor	3000 m	7:32.62 NR	5 June 2016	Birmingham
Outdoor	Two miles	8:07.85	24 August 2014	Birmingham
Outdoor	5000 m	12:53.11 NR	22 July 2011	Monaco
Outdoor	10,000 m	26:46.57 AR	3 June 2011	Eugene
Outdoor	One hour	21,330 m WR	4 September 2020	Brussels
Indoor	1500 m	3:39.03	28 January 2012	Glasgow
Indoor	One mile	3:57.92	4 February 2012	Boston
Indoor	3000 m	7:33.1+	21 February 2015	Birmingham
Indoor	Two miles	8:03.40	21 February 2015	Birmingham
Indoor	5000 m	13:09.16 AR	18 February 2017	Birmingham
Road	10 km	27:44	31 May 2010	London
Road	15 km	42:03+ AR	26 March 2016	Cardiff
Road	10 miles	46:25	25 October 2009	Portsmouth
Road	20 km	56:27 NR	22 March 2015	Lisbon
Road	Half marathon	59:07a	8 September 2019	Great North Run
Road	Half marathon	59:32 NR	22 March 2015	Lisbon
Road	Marathon	2:05:11	7 October 2018	Chicago Marathon

+ intermediate split in longer race
a = aided road course according to IAAF rule 260.28

== Biographical works ==
=== Autobiography ===
- Twin Ambitions: My Autobiography (2013, Hodder & Stoughton) ISBN 9781444779585

=== Children's fiction ===
- Ready Steady Mo! (with Kes Gray; illustrated by Marta Kissi) (2016, Hodder Children's Books) ISBN 9781444934076

=== Biopic ===
- Mo Farah: No Easy Mile; a non-fictional account of Farah's journey to the Olympics

=== Other ===
- Cardiff native Sonny Double 1 released a biographical grime musical named Mo Farah in 2016.

== See also ==
- 2012 Summer Olympics and Paralympics gold post boxes
- 5000 metres at the Olympics
- 10,000 metres at the Olympics
- 5000 metres at the World Championships in Athletics
- 10,000 metres at the World Championships in Athletics

Records
Preceded by Mohammed Mourhit	Men's 10,000 m European Record Holder; 3 June 2011 –	Succeeded by Incumbent
Preceded by Fermín Cacho	Men's 1500 m European Record Holder; 19 July 2013 – 14 August 2020	Succeeded by Jakob Ingebrigtsen
Preceded by Fabián Roncero	Men's Half-Marathon European Record Holder; 22 March 2015 – 8 February 2019	Succeeded by Julien Wanders
Preceded by Sondre Nordstad Moen	Men's Marathon European Record Holder; 9 September 2018 – 1 December 2019	Succeeded by Kaan Kigen Özbilen
