= 2012 IAAF World Indoor Championships – Men's 3000 metres =

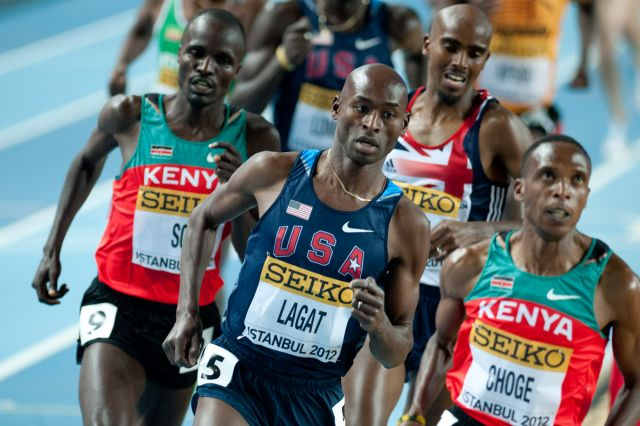
Bernard Lagat en route to victory.

The men's 3000 metres at the 2012 IAAF World Indoor Championships took place March 9 and 10 at the Ataköy Athletics Arena.

== Medalists ==
Gold	Silver	Bronze
Bernard Lagat; United States	Augustine Kiprono Choge; Kenya	Edwin Soi; Kenya

== Records ==
Standing records prior to the 2012 IAAF World Indoor Championships
World record	Daniel Komen (KEN)	7:24.90	Budapest, Hungary	6 February 1998
Championship record	Haile Gebrselassie (ETH)	7:34.71	Paris, France	9 March 1997
World Leading	Edwin Soi (KEN)	7:29.94	Karlsruhe, Germany	12 February 2012
African record	Daniel Komen (KEN)	7:24.90	Budapest, Hungary	6 February 1998
Asian record	Saif Saaeed Shaheen (QAT)	7:39.77	Pattaya, Thailand	11 February 2006
European record	Sergio Sánchez (ESP)	7:32.41	Valencia, Spain	13 February 2010
North and Central American and Caribbean record	Bernard Lagat (USA)	7:32.43	Birmingham, Great Britain	17 February 2007
Oceanian record	Craig Mottram (AUS)	7:34.50	Boston, United States	26 January 2008
South American record	Jacinto Navarrete (COL)	7:49.46	Seville, Spain	10 March 1991

== Qualification standards ==
Indoor	Outdoor
7:54.00	7:44.00 or 13:19.00 (5000 m)

== Schedule ==
Date	Time	Round
March 9, 2012	19:05	Heats
March 11, 2012	15:10	Final

== Results ==
=== Heats ===
Qualification: First 4 of each heat (Q) plus the 4 fastest qualified (q).

Rank	Heat	Name	Nationality	Time	Notes
1	1	Edwin Soi	Kenya	7:49.49	Q
2	1	Craig Mottram	Australia	7:49.62	Q, SB
3	1	Moses Ndiema Kipsiro	Uganda	7:49.71	Q
4	1	Yenew Alamirew	Ethiopia	7:49.92	Q
5	1	Lopez Lomong	United States	7:50.36	q, SB
6	1	Yoann Kowal	France	7:50.47	q
7	1	Arne Gabius	Germany	7:50.70	q
8	1	Elroy Gelant	South Africa	7:52.35	q, PB
9	1	Bilisuma Shugi	Bahrain	7:53.62	
10	1	Juan Luis Barrios	Mexico	7:54.07	NR
11	2	Augustine Kiprono Choge	Kenya	7:57.49	Q
12	2	Mo Farah	Great Britain	7:57.59	Q
13	2	Bernard Lagat	United States	7:57.68	Q
14	2	Dejen Gebremeskel	Ethiopia	7:57.69	Q
15	2	Hayle Ibrahimov	Azerbaijan	7:57.79	
16	2	Yohan Durand	France	7:59.10	
17	2	Victor García	Spain	7:59.85	
18	2	Polat Kemboi Arıkan	Turkey	8:02.37	
19	2	Alemu Bekele	Bahrain	8:02.83	
20	2	Robert Kajuga	Rwanda	8:07.44	PB
21	2	Cornelius Panga	Tanzania	8:15.20	PB

=== Final ===
9 athletes from 7 countries participated. The final started at 15:10.

Rank	Name	Nationality	Time	Notes
1st place, gold medalist(s)	Bernard Lagat	United States	7:41.44	SB
2nd place, silver medalist(s)	Augustine Kiprono Choge	Kenya	7:41.77	
3rd place, bronze medalist(s)	Edwin Cheruiyot Soi	Kenya	7:41.78	
4	Mo Farah	Great Britain	7:41.79	
5	Dejen Gebremeskel	Ethiopia	7:42.60	
6	Lopez Lomong	United States	7:44.16	PB
7	Moses Ndiema Kipsiro	Uganda	7:44.59	
8	Arne Gabius	Germany	7:45.01	
9	Yenew Alamirew	Ethiopia	7:45.15	
10	Yoann Kowal	France	7:47.81	
11	Craig Mottram	Australia	7:48.23	SB
12	Elroy Gelant	South Africa	7:48.64	NR
