= Muktar Edris =

Ethiopian long-distance runner (born 1994)

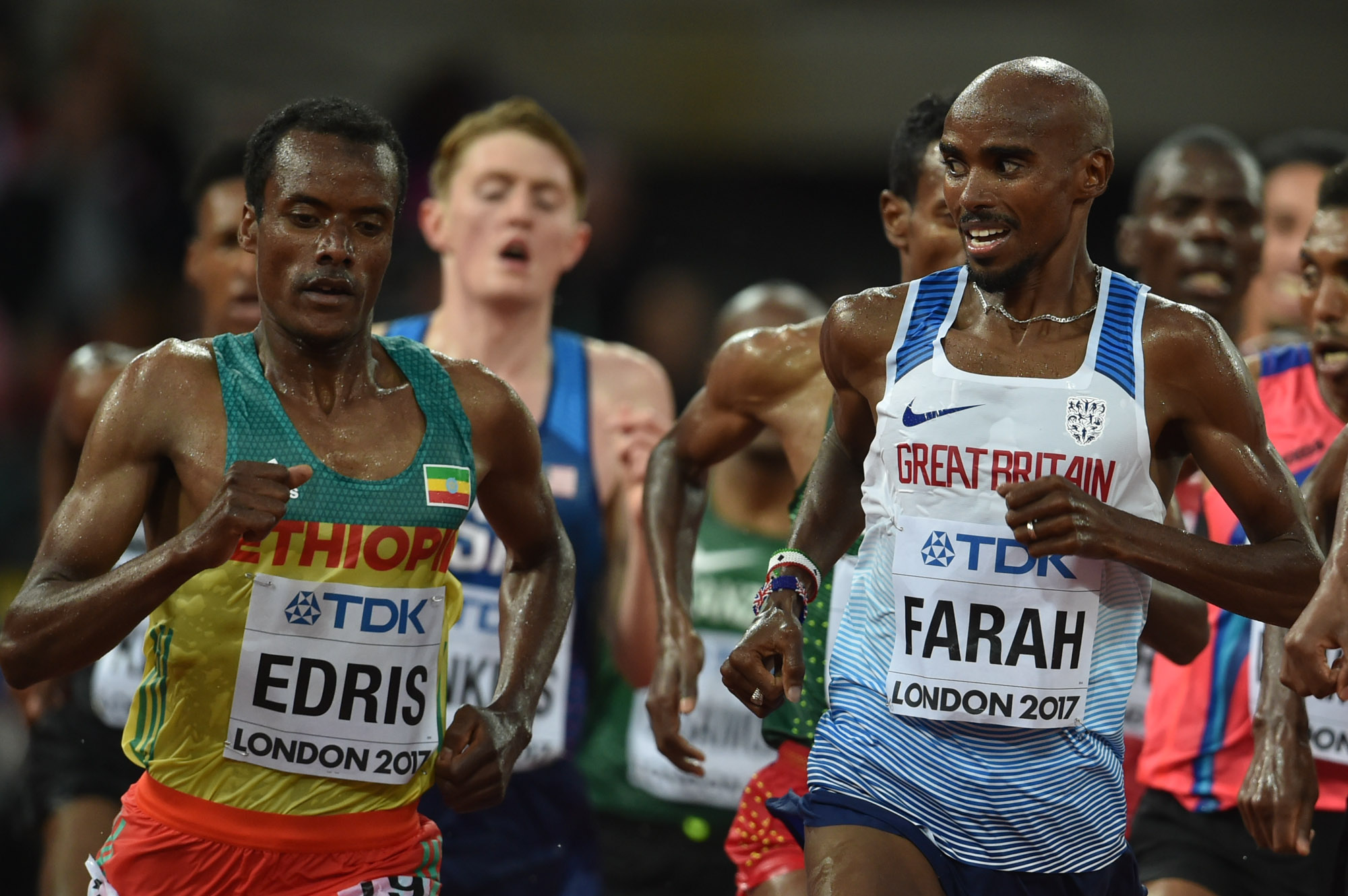
- Edris in 2013

Personal information
- Nationality: Ethiopian
- Born: 14 January 1994 (age 32) Siltʼe Zone, Ethiopia
- Height: 171 cm (5 ft 7 in)
- Weight: 60 kg (132 lb)

Sport
- Country: Ethiopia
- Sport: Athletics
- Event: Long-distance running

Achievements and titles
- Olympic finals: 2016; 5000 m, DQ (4th)
- World finals: 2013; 5000 m, 7th 2015; 10,000 m, 10th 2017; 5000 m, Gold; 2019; 5000 m, Gold
- Personal bests: 3000 m: 7:32.31 (Paris 2017); 5000 m: 12:54.83 (Stockholm 2014); 10,000 m: 27:17.18 (Hengelo 2015)
Medal record
World Championships
Gold medal – first place	2017 London	5000 m
Gold medal – first place	2019 Doha	5000 m
World Cross Country Championships
Gold medal – first place	2013 Bydgoszcz	Team
Gold medal – first place	2015 Guiyang	Team
Bronze medal – third place	2013 Bydgoszcz	Junior race
Bronze medal – third place	2015 Guiyang	Senior race
World Junior Championships
Gold medal – first place	2012 Barcelona	5000 m

Muktar Edris (born 14 January 1994) is an Ethiopian professional long-distance runner who competes in track and cross country races. He is a two-time World champion over 5000 metres.

== Career ==
Muktar made his first international appearances in 2011, taking seventh place in the junior race at the 2011 IAAF World Cross Country Championships (sharing the team silver medal) and finishing fourth in the 10,000 metres at the 2011 African Junior Athletics Championships with a time of 28:44.95 minutes.

He began to raise his profile in 2012 with two prominent wins on the junior stage. First he defeated Kenyan opposition to win at the 2012 African Cross Country Championships, and then he went on to take the 5,000 metres gold medal at the 2012 World Junior Championships in Athletics. He performed well in the 5,000 m that year, taking the Ethiopian national title (in the absence of many established runners). He won over the distance at the Meeting Lille Métropole and competed on the Diamond League for the first time, setting a best of 13:04.34 minutes at the Meeting Areva in Paris. He had podium finishes on the Italian road circuit towards the end of the year, coming in third at the Giro di Castelbuono and close to victory at the BOClassic, where he recorded the same time as the winner Imane Merga.

He performed well in cross country at the start of 2013, winning the Campaccio, Cross della Vallagarina and Cinque Mulini races. He followed this up with a bronze in the 2013 IAAF World Cross Country Championships in the junior race, behind compatriot Hagos Gebrhiwet. In his first road outing of the year he won the Giro Media Blenio race.

In Stockholm, on 21 August 2014, he recorded the fastest time in the world so far that year with 12:54.83.

On 12 August 2017, he won the 5,000 metres at the World Championships in Athletics 2017 London beating Mo Farah in his last track race at the world championships. The Gold medal was the second for Ethiopia in London 2017 enhancing its world ranking to number 4 on the day.

On 30 September 2019, he won the 5,000m race in the 2019 World Athletics Championships in Doha with a time of 12:58.85.

== Personal bests ==
- 3,000 metres: 7:30.96 minutes (2021)
- 5,000 metres: 12:54.83 minutes (2014)
- 10,000 metres: 27:17.18 minutes (2015)
- 10 km road: 27:57 minutes (2019)

== Major competitions ==
Year	Competition	Venue	Position	Event	Notes
Representing Ethiopia
2013	World Championships	Moscow, Russia	7th	5000 m	13:29.56
2015	World Championships	Beijing, China	10th	10000 m	27:54.47
2016	Olympic Games	Rio de Janeiro, Brazil	–	5000 m	DQ
2017	World Championships	London, United Kingdom	1st	5000 m	13:32.79
2019	World Championships	Doha, Qatar	1st	5000 m	12:58.85
2021	Ethiopian Trials	Hengelo, Netherlands	5th	5000 m	13:04.69
2022	World Championships	Eugene, United States	13th	5000 m	13:24.67
