= Mathilde Heuing =

German runner (born 1952)

Mathilde Heuing (born 25 September 1952) is a German former middle- and long-distance runner.

She was runner-up to Brigitte Kraus over 1500 metres at the 1979 West German Championships. She was also second placed at the 1980 West German Cross Country Championships, which was won by Ellen Wessinghage. At the end of 1981 she won the BOclassic women's race in Italy. This was followed by a win at the Rotterdam Marathon in April 1982 in a time of 2:54:03 hours. It marked the peak of her career and was her last major athletic win.

She continues to run in her spare time and works as a ski equipment shop manager.
