= Giro Media Blenio =

Swiss road running event

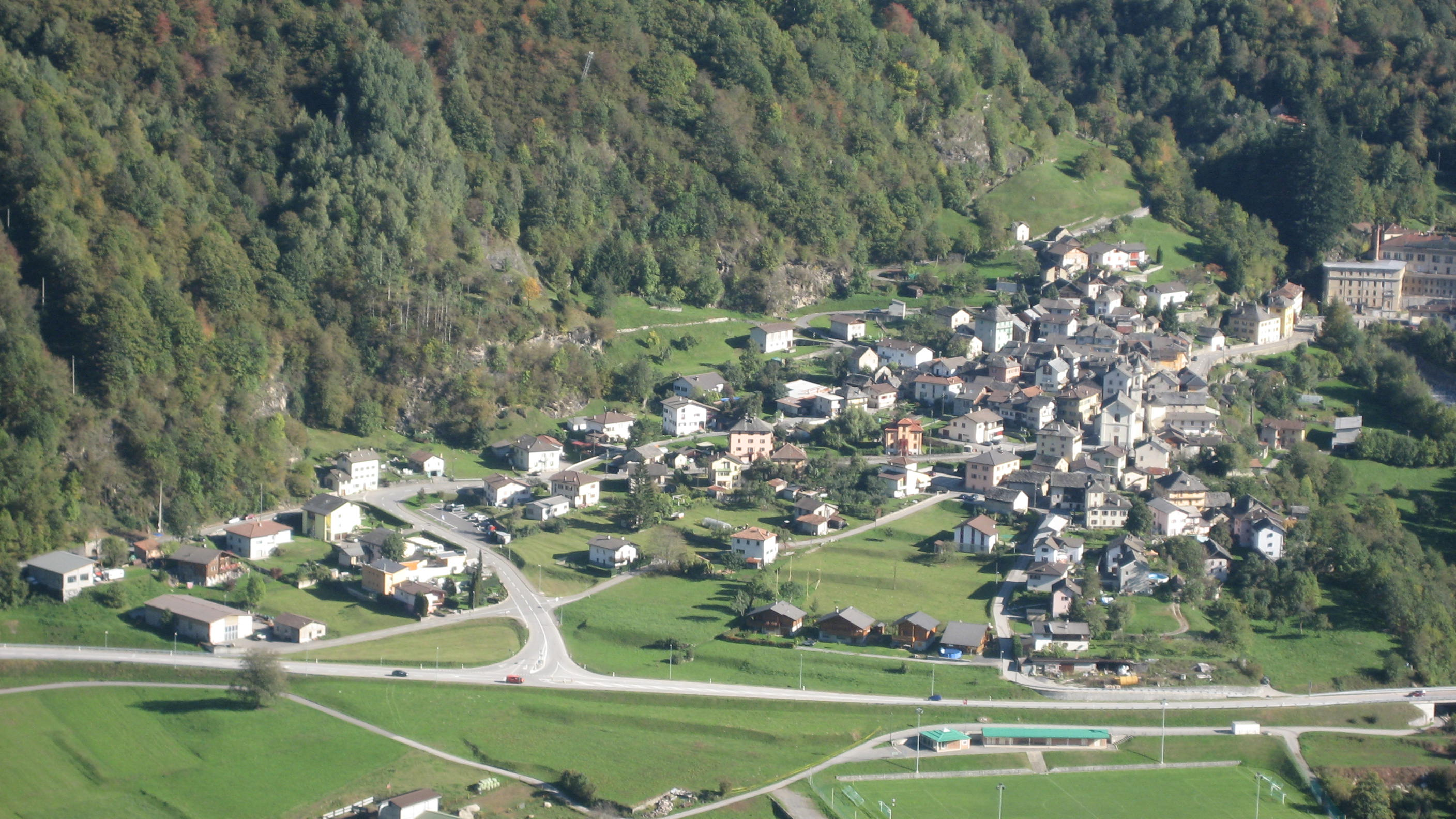
The village of Dongio hosts the annual races.

The Giro Media Blenio is an annual road running event over 10 kilometres which takes place in April in the village of Dongio, Switzerland. It was created in honour of Markus Ryffel's silver medal in the 5000 metres at the 1984 Los Angeles Olympics.

The event, held in the district of Blenio, is divided into four race types. The 10 km Grand Prix is an elite, open class men's race, while the Giro provides an alternate 10 km for amateur fun runners. Shorter races are offered for young runners in the Mini Giro section and a separate race is held for people wishing to complete the course by walking and Nordic walking. The main 10 km race was included on the Post-Cup series of Swiss races for its 25th anniversary in 2009.

The route for the elite Grand Prix race is a 1.25 km circuit around the streets of Dongio, which athletes complete eight times in the course of the race. The fun run is a larger circuit, which passes the nearby settlements of Roccabella, Motto and Ludiano. A total of 1000 runners (761 men and 229 women) took part in the Giro in 2011, while more than 1500 people participated in the day's other events.

The Giro Media Blenio had its inaugural edition in 1985 and for its first nine years it featured an 11 km men's race and an 8 km race for women. From 1994 to 2006 the distances were set at 10 km for men and 5 km for women, but the women's race was dropped from the programme from 2007 onwards. Winners of the men's elite race include Haile Gebrselassie, Olympic champion Khalid Skah and World Cross Country Champions Paul Tergat and William Sigei. On the women's side, the first edition was won by Ellen Wessinghage, a former mile run world record holder, and she was later joined by 2003 world champion Berhane Adere, Olympic medallist Isabella Ochichi and world medallist Priscah Jepleting Cherono.

== Past elite winners ==
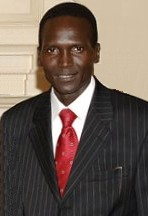
Kenya's Paul Tergat won the race on three occasions.

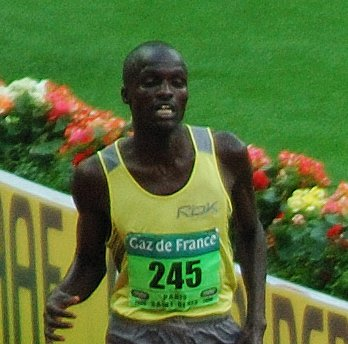
Edwin Soi won three times consecutively from 2006 to 2008.

Key: Course record 11 km men's/8 km women's races

Edition	Year	Men's winner	Time (h:m:s)	Women's winner	Time (h:m:s)
1st	1985	Dietmar Millonig (AUT)	33:31	Ellen Wessinghage (GER)	40:11 (11 km)
2nd	1986	Markus Ryffel (SUI)	33:07	Cornelia Bürki (SUI)	38:15 (11 km)
3rd	1987	Dietmar Millonig (AUT)	33:01	Debbie Elsmore (NZL)	38:19 (11 km)
4th	1988	Christoph Herle (GER)	32:36	Martine Oppliger (SUI)	29:12 (8 km)
5th	1989	Moses Tanui (KEN)	31:51	Isabella Moretti (SUI)	27:10
6th	1990	Mark Rowland (GBR)	32:59	Sandra Gasser (SUI)	27:29
7th	1991	Andrea Sambu Sipe (TAN)	32:21	Alena Močáriová (SVK)	26:57
8th	1992	Barnabas Korir (KEN)	33:23	Jane Ngotho (KEN)	27:26
9th	1993	Paul Tergat (KEN)	31:49	Pamela Chepchumba (KEN)	26:52
10th	1994	William Sigei (KEN)	27:34	Merima Denboba (ETH)	33:41 (10 km)
11th	1995	Haile Gebrselassie (ETH)	28:02	Sally Barsosio (KEN)	16:10
12th	1996	Paul Tergat (KEN)	28:36	Annemari Sandell (FIN)	15:48
13th	1997	Paul Tergat (KEN)	28:19	Lydia Cheromei (KEN)	15:43
14th	1998	Paul Koech (KEN)	28:30	Berhane Adere (ETH)	16:14
15th	1999	Evans Rutto (KEN)	28:37.4	Restituta Joseph (TAN)	16:07.9
16th	2000	Robert Kipkorir Kipchumba (KEN)	29:02.7	Rose Cheruiyot (KEN)	15:55.5
17th	2001	Paul Malakwen Kosgei (KEN)	28:13.4	Isabella Ochichi (KEN)	15:41.1
18th	2002	Benson Barus (KEN)	29:27.0	Merima Denboba (ETH)	16:23.3
19th	2003	John Yuda Msuri (TAN)	28:41.3	Joan Jepkorir Aiyabei (KEN)	16:02.7
20th	2004	Richard Limo (KEN)	28:51.5	Alice Timbilil (KEN)	15:55.4
21st	2005	Paul Kimaiyo Kimugul (KEN)	28:35.2	Alice Timbilil (KEN)	15:31.1
22nd	2006	Edwin Soi (KEN)	28:27.3	Priscah Jepleting Cherono (KEN)	15:54.2
23rd	2007	Edwin Soi (KEN)	28:24.8	—	—
24th	2008	Edwin Soi (KEN)	28:59.7	—	—
25th	2009	Moses Mosop (KEN)	28:52.6	—	—
26th	2010	Imane Merga (ETH)	29:02.3	—	—
27th	2011	Imane Merga (ETH)	28:17.8	—	—
28th	2012	Edwin Soi (KEN)	28:31	—	—
29th	2013	Muktar Edris (ETH)	28:10	—	—
30th	2014	Cornelius Kipruto Kangogo (KEN)	28:14.9	—	—
