= Edwin Soi =

Kenyan long-distance runner (born 1986)

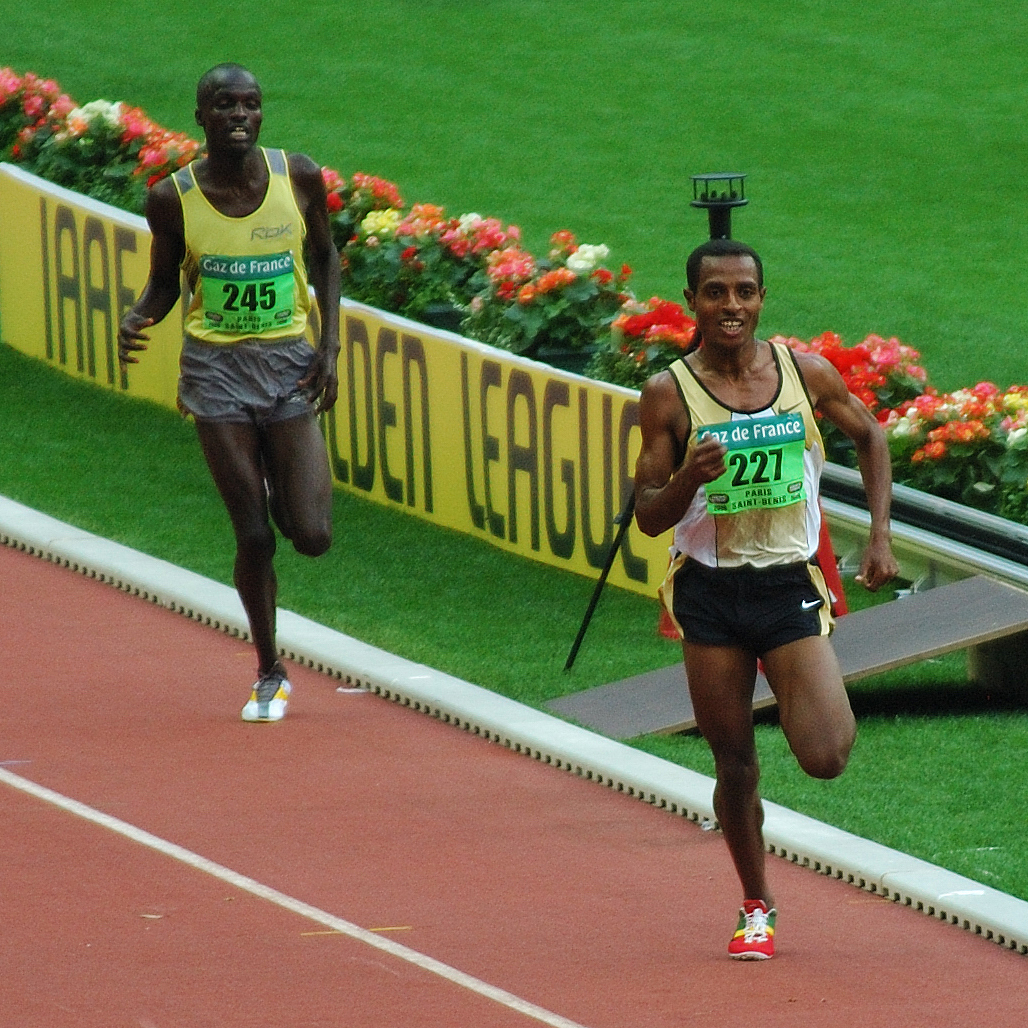
- Soi trailing Kenenisa Bekele at the 2006 Meeting Gaz de France

Personal information
- Full name: Edwin Cheruiyot Soi
- Born: 3 March 1986 (age 40) Kericho, Kenya

Sport
- Country: Kenya
- Sport: Track and field
- Event: 3000 metres – Marathon
Medal record
Men's athletics
Representing Kenya
Olympic Games
Bronze medal – third place	2008 Beijing	5000 m
World Indoor Championships
Bronze medal – third place	2012 Istanbul	3000 m
African Championships
Gold medal – first place	2010 Nairobi	5000 m
World Athletics Final
Gold medal – first place	2007 Stuttgart	5000 m
Gold medal – first place	2007 Stuttgart	3000 m
Gold medal – first place	2008 Stuttgart	5000 m
Silver medal – second place	2006 Stuttgart	5000 m
Silver medal – second place	2006 Stuttgart	3000 m
Silver medal – second place	2008 Stuttgart	3000 m
Bronze medal – third place	2009 Thessaloniki	5000 m

Edwin Cheruiyot Soi (born 3 March 1986) is a Kenyan professional long-distance runner who specialises in the 3000 and 5000 metres. He is a two-time Olympian for Kenya.

His earliest honours were team gold medals with Kenya at the IAAF World Cross Country Championships in 2006 and 2007. Soi has had his success on the track – he was the 5000 m bronze medallist at the 2008 Beijing Olympics and was highly successful at the IAAF World Athletics Final, taking three gold and three silver medals from 2006 to 2008. He became the continental champion on the track at the 2010 African Championships in Athletics and was the 3000 m bronze medallist at the 2012 IAAF World Indoor Championships.

Soi has won numerous 10K road races in his career; he has won three times consecutively at the BOclassic, Memorial Peppe Greco and Giro Media Blenio races, and has had four straight wins at the Giro al Sas. His personal best for the distance is 27:46 minutes.

== Career ==
=== Early races ===
Soi had his first running successes when undertaking a tour of races in Spain in 2004. He won the Cursa Bombers 10K in Barcelona and won a second 10K race in Madrid that November. His first opportunity to represent Kenya internationally came in 2006, as he gained selection for the 2006 IAAF World Cross Country Championships with a fourth-place finish at the national short cross country race. He finished in eighth place in the short race and helped Kenya to the team gold medal, alongside Isaac Kiprono Songok, Benjamin Limo and Augustine Kiprono Choge.

The 2006 season also brought him further success on the road circuit as he won both the Giro Media Blenio and the 10 km du Conseil Général 13 in Marseille, setting a career best time of 27:46 minutes at the latter race. He took part on the Golden League circuit for the first time that year and marked himself out as one of the top runners over 3000 and 5000 metres – he was second to Kenenisa Bekele at the Meeting Gaz de France with a 5000 m best time of 12:52.40 and won at the Athletissima meet. He capped of his track season with two silver medals at the 2006 IAAF World Athletics Final, beaten to the gold medals by brothers Kenenisa and Tariku Bekele.

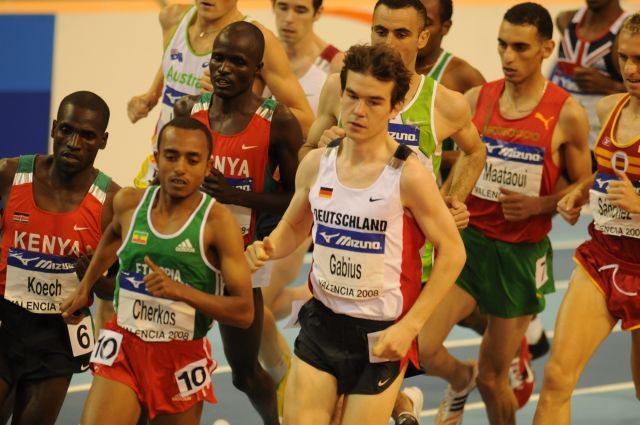
Soi (centre left) running in the 2008 World Indoor final in Valencia

The 2007 IAAF World Cross Country Championships were held in Mombasa and, after a win at the Cross Ouest France, he earned selection for the national team. In a Kenyan-dominated race, Soi took ninth place with five of his compatriots finishing ahead of him. He retained both his 10K titles at the Giro Media Blenio and in Marseille. After a number of top three finishes on the track circuit, he hoped to qualify for the 2007 World Championships in Athletics. A fourth place at the trials saw him narrowly miss out on selection, although his track season had a successful culmination with a 3000/5000 m double at the 2007 IAAF World Athletics Final. This made him the first Kenyan to win both events at the competition. He ran at a New Year's Eve race in Bolzano, the BOclassic, and took the victory in the 10K race.

=== Olympic medal ===
After running an indoor 3000 m personal best of 7:36.70 in Valencia, Soi was chosen to compete in the event at the 2008 IAAF World Indoor Championships. Despite being the fastest qualifier for the final, he slipped behind the leaders and finished in fourth place. He won his first Olympic medal at the 2008 Beijing Olympics. He failed to build upon his Olympic success at the 2009 World Championships as he was ill-prepared for the Kenyan Trials and missed out on a place in the Kenyan team. In September 2009, he won his second Memorial Peppe Greco in Scicli – an achievement only matched by Haile Gebrselassie and Martin Lel.

Soi became the continental champion at the 2010 African Championships in Athletics, winning the men's 5000 m title. He was selected to represent Africa at the 2010 IAAF Continental Cup but managed only fourth place. He took his third 10K victory in Scicli in September. He also defended his title at the Giro al Sas 10K race in Trento, seeing off a challenge from Wilson Busienei in the final stages. He signalled his return to cross country running that November with a third-place finish at the Oeiras Cross Country in Portugal. He attempted a fourth straight win at the BOclassic, but was beaten into third place by Imane Merga and Mo Farah. In the 2011 track season he ran two personal bests: he ran 7:27.55 min over 3000 m to take second at the 2011 Diamond League meet in Doha, then set a two-mile best of 8:14.10 min at the Prefontaine Classic (where he was runner-up to Bernard Lagat). He did not make the Kenyan team for the 2011 World Championships in Athletics. Soi had a third consecutive win at the Giro al Sas race that October and ended the year with his fourth career win at the BOClassic.

In his first race of 2012, he edged Vincent Chepkok at the line to win the Campaccio race. An indoor personal best of 7:29.94 minutes for the 3000 m earned him a place at the 2012 IAAF World Indoor Championships, where he won his second global medal in the form of the 3000 m bronze. He qualified for the Kenyan Olympic team for a second time, but failed to make the 5000 m final at the 2012 London Olympics, placing sixth in his heat. On the roads that year, he edged out Thomas Longosiwa to take his fourth career win at the Media Blenio race in April and had a fourth straight win at the Giro al Sas.

In 2013 he focused on 5000 m track running and began his year by ending Mo Farah's year-and-a-half winning streak, beating the Olympic champion at the Prefontaine Classic. He was only fifth at the Golden Gala but a third place at the Kenyan trials guaranteed his selection for the 2013 World Championships in Athletics. He ran a personal best and meeting record of 12:51.34 minutes at the Herculis meeting a month before the World 5000 m final, but at the championship race he finished out of the medals in fifth place. He ended the track season at the Memorial Van Damme and came fourth. In October he retained the Giro al Sas title yet again.

== Career highlights ==
IAAF World Cross Country Championships
2006 – Fukuoka, 8th at short race
2006 – Fukuoka, (gold) 1st at short team competition (with Songok / Limo / Choge)
2007 – Mombasa, 8th at long race
2007 – Mombasa, (gold) 1st at long team competition (with Mosop / B. Kipyego / Ngatuny / Macharinyang / M. Kipyego)
IAAF World Athletics Final
2006 – Stuttgart, (silver) 2nd at 3,000 m
2006 – Stuttgart, (silver) 2nd at 5,000 m
2007 – Stuttgart, (gold) 1st at 3,000 m
2007 – Stuttgart, (gold) 1st at 5,000 m
2008 – Stuttgart, (gold) 1st at 5,000 m
2008 – Stuttgart, (silver) 2nd at 3,000 m
2009 – Thessaloniki, (bronze) 3rd at 5,000 m
Other races
2007 – Le Mans, (gold) 1st at Cross Ouest France
2007 – Bolzano, (gold) 1st at BOclassic
2008 – Bolzano, (gold) 1st at BOclassic
2008 – San Giorgio su Legnano, (gold) 1st at Campaccio EAA Cross Country
2009 – Bolzano, (gold) 1st at BOclassic

== Personal bests ==
Distance	Mark	Date	Location
1,500 m	3:40.52	6 October 2013	Fossano
3,000 m	7:27.55	6 May 2011	Doha
Two miles	8:14.10	4 June 2011	Eugene
5000 m	12:51.34	19 July 2013	Monaco
10,000 m	27:14.83	25 August 2006	Brussels
10 km	27:46.00	1 May 2006	Marseille
Half Marathon	1:00:24	24 February 2019	Granollers
Marathon	2:09:16	28 November 2021	La Rochelle

Sporting positions
Preceded by Kenenisa Bekele	Men's 3,000 m Best Year Performance; 2008	Succeeded by Eliud Kipchoge
