= Imane Merga =

Ethiopian long-distance runner (born 1988)

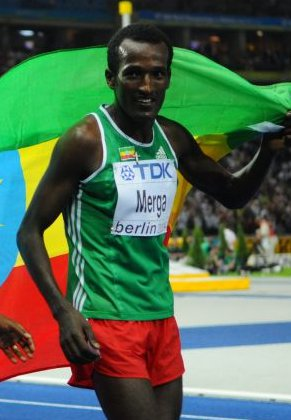
- Merga during the 2009 World Championships

Personal information
- Born: 15 October 1988 (age 38) Tulu Bolo, Ethiopia
Medal record
Men's athletics
Representing Ethiopia
World Championships
Bronze medal – third place	2011 Daegu	10,000 m
World Cross Country Championships
Gold medal – first place	2011 Punta Umbria	Senior race
Silver medal – second place	2013 Bydgoszcz	Senior race

Imane Merga Jida (ኢማነ መርጋ ጂዳ) (born 15 October 1988) is an Ethiopian professional long-distance runner who specializes in the 5000 and 10,000 metres. He won his first world title at the 2011 IAAF World Cross Country Championships. At the 2011 World Championships in Athletics he won the 10,000 m bronze medal, but he was disqualified in the 5000 m, losing a second bronze.

Imane won the first two 5000 m titles in the annual IAAF Diamond League and was the gold medalist at the 2009 IAAF World Athletics Final. He has also won the Giro Media Blenio and BOClassic road races. His personal best times are 7:51.24 minutes in the 3000 metres, achieved in May 2009 at the Icahn Stadium; 12:53.58 minutes in the 5000 metres, achieved in August 2010 in Stockholm; and 26:48.35 minutes in the 10,000 metres, achieved in June 2011 in Oregon. He began working with Italian technical coach Renato Canova at the start of 2010.

== Career ==
He was born in Tulu Bolo, Ethiopia. He went to F/H/G/A/Mechal Elementary School and represented the school in various local running events before making it to the national and then world stage. He later moved to Harrar, East Ethiopia and continued training there for a brief period of time before coming to Addis Ababa where he joined local athletics club. His first appearances on the world stage came in cross country running – he finished seventh in the men's junior race at the 2007 IAAF World Cross Country Championships in Mombasa and he went on to win at the Oeiras International Cross Country later that year.

In 2008, he ran at the São Silvestre da Amadora road race, winning the 10 km competition in 29:27. Merga won the Antrim International Cross Country in early 2009 and went on to finish second behind Gebregziabher Gebremariam at the Ethiopian 10,000 m championships in July. He finished fourth in the 10,000 metres at the 2009 World Championships and won the 5000 metres at the 2009 World Athletics Final. He closed the year on the cross country circuit, winning at the Cross de l'Acier for a third consecutive time.

He began his 2010 season with a win at the 10 km Giro Media Blenio race in Dongio, beating defending champion Moses Mosop in the process. Having won the 5000 m at the Bislett Games and the Golden Gala, he went on to become the inaugural 2010 IAAF Diamond League champion in the event. He represented Africa in the event at the 2010 IAAF Continental Cup, but came in fifth. He attempted a fourth straight win at the Cross de l'Acier, but was beaten to the line by reigning cross country champion Joseph Ebuya. He ended 2010 with a win at the BOclassic, defeating Mo Farah in a sprint finish.

At the Jan Meda Cross Country in February 2011 he came second, some distance behind race winner Hunegnaw Mesfin who took the national title. However, he beat his countryman and all other contenders at the 2011 IAAF World Cross Country Championships, closing the race with a quick sprint finish. His world title followed a 15-month stretch in which he had not won a cross country race. He ended his cross country season with another win on grass, beating Caleb Ndiku and world runner-up Paul Tanui at the Trofeo Alasport in Alà dei Sardi. Turning to the European road circuit, he retained his Giro Media Blenio title with a quick run to the line. In the 2011 Diamond League he won the 5000 m at the Golden Gala and then, in the absence of the event leader Mo Farah, he won at the Memorial van Damme final to be elected the Diamond race winner for a second time running.

At the 2011 World Championships in Athletics he won the bronze medal over 10,000 m while his teammate Ibrahim Jeilan won the title. Imane won his second bronze of the competition in the Men's 5000 metres, but he was later disqualified for having run inside the curb of the running track for some 10 to 15 metres. Fellow Ethiopian Dejen Gebremeskel was elevated to the bronze medal as a result.

He continued his cross country winning streak at the Cross de Atapuerca in November, but was then defeated by 2010 World Champion Ebuya at the Cross de l'Acier. He tried for a second win at the BOClassic, but was third behind Edwin Soi, and was again beaten the Kenyan at the Campaccio race.

Imane failed in his attempt to make the Ethiopian team for both 2012 Summer Olympics and 2016 Summer Olympics, and only made the top three once on the 2012 Diamond League circuit (third in the 5000 m at the Bislett Games). He fared better away from the track with a time of 59:56 minutes for his half marathon debut at the Great North Run, where he placed third. He won the Cross de Atapuerca in November and in December he won the Ethiopian Clubs Cross Country Championships and the end-of-year BOClassic race.

He came close to defending his world title at the 2013 IAAF World Cross Country Championships but was eventually beaten in the final stages by Japhet Korir, finishing as runner-up by a margin of four seconds. He was runner-up again at the Giro Media Blenio, beaten by his junior compatriot Muktar Edris. The 10,000 m was his focus on the track that year and he was runner-up at the Prefontaine Classic. He ran a season's best of 26:57.33 minutes at the Folksam Grand Prix, but at the 2013 World Championships in Athletics he was only twelfth in the World 10,000 metres final. After the track season he came fifth at the Portugal Half Marathon and third at the Giro al Sas.

Imane suffers from a natural speech disorder.
