= BOclassic =

Road running competition in Bolzano, Italy

Coordinates: 46.4984°N 11.3546°E

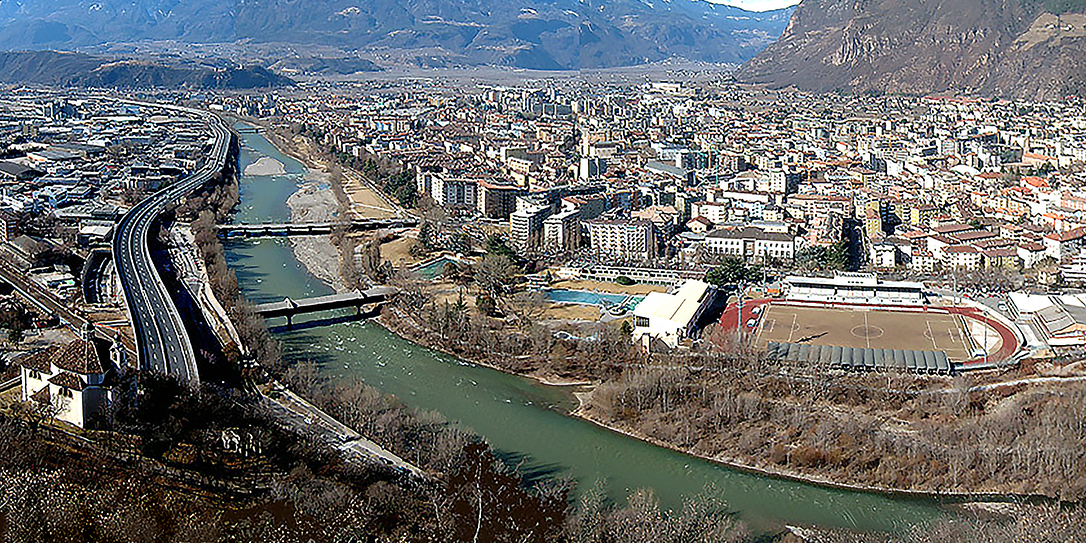
- A panorama of Bolzano's town centre where the race takes place
- Date: 31 December
- Location: Bolzano, Italy
- Event type: Road
- Distance: 5 kilometres (women); 10 kilometres (men)
- Established: 1975
- Course records: Men: 28:00 (2023) (Zimbabwe) Sabastian Sawe; Women: 15:22 (2021) (Ethiopia) Dawit Seyaum
- Website: BOclassic

The BOclassic Alto Adige is an annual road running competition over the distance of 10 kilometres for men and 5 kilometres for women. It is held on New Year's Eve in Bolzano, Italy. The competition has only elite races, competed between a limited number of runners, but over 10,000 spectators gather in the streets each year to witness the race. The race has been broadcast live on television by Italian channel Rai Sport.

It was first held in 1975 under the title Corsa Internazionale di San Silvestro – inspired by the Saint Silvester Road Race in Brazil, it was the first European New Year's Eve road race (Silvesterlauf). After nine editions as a 13 km race, the men's race settled on its 10 km format. A women's competition was included in the programme from 1977 onwards and it has been a 5 km race since 1987. The Corsa Internazionale di San Silvestro changed its name in 1996 into BOclassic Alto Adige.

The course is in the centre of the town of Bolzano. It is a looped circuit, starting at Walther Square and heading west on Via della Mostra before turning onto Via Goethe and Via del Portici. The route then heads southwards along Via Laurin before looping back on itself to follow along Vaile della Stazione back to the starting point.

Past male competitors have included multiple European champion Serhiy Lebid, Olympic marathon champion Stefano Baldini while women such as World Half Marathon Champions Tegla Loroupe and Berhane Adere have won the women's section. The 2011 edition featured three reigning world champions in Vivian Cheruiyot, Imane Merga and Wilson Kiprop.

== Past winners ==
Key: Course record

Edition	Year	Men's winner	Time (m:s)	Women's winner	Time (m:s)	Ref.
1st	1975	Anton Gorbunow (GER)	39:59	Not held	N/A	
2nd	1976	Günter Zahn (GER)	39:30	Not held	N/A	
3rd	1977	Patriz Ilg (GER)	38:33	Heide Brenner (GER)	47:45	
4th	1978	Dietmar Millonig (AUT)	38:46	Heide Brenner (GER)	46:25	
5th	1979	Klaus-Peter Hildenbrand (GER)	39:09	Päivi Roppo (FIN)	22:46	
6th	1980	Christoph Herle (GER)	38:32	Ellen Wessinghage (GER)	21:11	
7th	1981	Christoph Herle (GER)	38:48	Mathilde Heuing (GER)	22:28	
8th	1982	Emiel Puttemans (BEL)	38:03	Christiane Finke (GER)	22:54	
9th	1983	Alex Hagelsteens (BEL)	37:45	Ellen Wessinghage (GER)	21:34	
10th	1984	Alex Hagelsteens (BEL)	29:10	Birgit-Maria Schmidt (GER)	17:03	
11th	1985	Alberto Cova (ITA)	29:31	Cristina Tomasini (ITA)	14:54	
12th	1986	Pierre Délèze (SUI)	29:25	Vera Michallek (GER)	14:54	
13th	1987	Féthi Baccouche (TUN)	28:46	Elly van Hulst (NED)	16:02	
14th	1988	Salvatore Antibo (ITA)	28:34	Maria Curatolo (ITA)	15:54	
15th	1989	Ezequiel Canário (POR)	28:27	Elly van Hulst (NED)	16:11	
16th	1990	Stephenson Nyamu (KEN)	28:38	Uta Pippig (GER)	16:04	
17th	1991	Phillimon Hanneck (ZIM)	28:02	Kathrin Weßel (GER)	15:34	
18th	1992	Jonah Koech (born 1968) (KEN)	28:25	Lyudmila Borisova (RUS)	16:05	
19th	1993	Addis Abebe (ETH)	28:43	Lyudmila Borisova (RUS)	16:01	
20th	1994	Shem Kororia (KEN)	28:33	Tegla Loroupe (KEN)	15:49	
21st	1995	Shem Kororia (KEN)	28:19	Tegla Loroupe (KEN)	15:49	
22nd	1996	Daniel Komen (KEN)	28:37	Tegla Loroupe (KEN)	16:14	
23rd	1997	Bernard Barmasai (KEN)	28:08	Berhane Adere (ETH)	16:02	
24th	1998	Paul Kosgei (KEN)	28:10	Merima Denboba (ETH)	15:44	
25th	1999	Serhiy Lebid (UKR)	28:24	Gete Wami (ETH)	15:50	
26th	2000	John Korir (KEN)	28:27	Merima Denboba (ETH)	16:08	
27th	2001	Serhiy Lebid (UKR)	28:41.5	Susan Chepkemei (KEN)	16:26.4	
28th	2002	Serhiy Lebid (UKR)	29:02	Berhane Adere (ETH)	15:50.6	
29th	2003	Serhiy Lebid (UKR)	28:36	Berhane Adere (ETH)	15:49.9	
30th	2004	Serhiy Lebid (UKR)	28:23.1	Berhane Adere (ETH)	16:14.7	
31st	2005	Abebe Dinkesa (ETH)	28:38.9	Isabella Ochichi (KEN)	15:53.6	
32nd	2006	Abderrahim Goumri (MAR)	28:34.0	Anikó Kálovics (HUN)	15:44.6	
33rd	2007	Edwin Soi (KEN)	28:50.7	Sylvia Kibet (KEN)	16:01.6	
34th	2008	Edwin Soi (KEN)	28:55.5	Gulnara Samitova-Galkina (RUS)	15:59.7	
35th	2009	Edwin Soi (KEN)	28:44.3	Sule Utura (ETH)	16:11.4	
36th	2010	Imane Merga (ETH)	28:32	Vivian Cheruiyot (KEN)	15:52	
37th	2011	Edwin Soi (KEN)	28:16	Vivian Cheruiyot (KEN)	16:03	
38th	2012	Imane Merga (ETH)	29:12	Sylvia Kibet (KEN)	16:21	
39th	2013	Imane Merga (ETH)	28:43	Maryam Jamal (BHR)	16:00	
40th	2014	Muktar Edris (ETH)	29:07.1	Janet Kisa (KEN)	15:49.4	
41st	2015	Tamirat Tola (ETH)	28:29	Netsanet Gudeta (ETH)	15:58	
42nd	2016	Muktar Edris (ETH)	28:52	Agnes Tirop (KEN)	15:44	
43rd	2017	Muktar Edris (ETH)	28:45	Agnes Tirop (KEN)	15:30	
44th	2018	Tamirat Tola (ETH)	28:12	Netsanet Gudeta (ETH)	15:46	
45th	2019	Eyob Faniel (ITA)	28:21	Margaret Kipkemboi (KEN)	15:30	
46th	2020	Oscar Chelimo (UGA)	13:17	Margaret Kipkemboi (KEN)	30:43	
47th	2021	Tadese Worku (ETH)	28:18	Dawit Seyaum (ETH)	15:22	
48th	2022	Oscar Chelimo (UGA)	28:14	Dawit Seyaum (ETH)	15:33	
49th	2023	Sabastian Sawe (KEN)	28:00	Nadia Battocletti (ITA)	15:30	

- NB: The race course distances varied in the early years of the competition but the men's distance settled at 10 km from 1984 onwards and the women's race has been a 5K run since 1987.
- 2020 race distances: Men: 5 km, Women: 10k m

== See also ==
- Giro di Castelbuono
- Memorial Peppe Greco
