= 2005 Asian Athletics Championships – Men's 800 metres =

The men's 800 metres event at the 2005 Asian Athletics Championships was held in Incheon, South Korea on September 2–4.

== Medalists ==
| Gold | Silver | Bronze |
|---|---|---|
| Majed Saeed Sultan; Qatar | Abdulrahman Suleiman; Qatar | Sajjad Moradi; Iran |

== Results ==
=== Heats ===
| Rank | Heat | Name | Nationality | Time | Notes |
|---|---|---|---|---|---|
| 1 | 1 | Mohammed Al-Salhi | Saudi Arabia | 1:48.08 | Q |
| 2 | 3 | Majed Saeed Sultan | Qatar | 1:48.61 | Q |
| 3 | 3 | Adnan Taess | Iraq | 1:48.71 | Q |
| 4 | 3 | Mohammad Al-Azemi | Kuwait | 1:48.75 | q |
| 5 | 1 | Sajjad Moradi | Iran | 1:49.52 | Q |
| 6 | 3 | Yoshihiro Shimodaira | Japan | 1:49.86 | q |
| 7 | 2 | Abdulrahman Suleiman | Qatar | 1:50.50 | Q |
| 8 | 2 | Mohammed Shaween | Saudi Arabia | 1:50.68 | Q |
| 9 | 1 | le van Duong | Vietnam | 1:50.74 | SB |
| 10 | 1 | Lee Jae-hoon | South Korea | 1:50.88 | |
| 11 | 1 | Chen Fu-Pin | Chinese Taipei | 1:51.43 | |
| 12 | 3 | Irshad Fazal | Pakistan | 1:51.58 | SB |
| 13 | 2 | Hisato Suzuki | Japan | 1:51.63 | |
| 14 | 3 | Ibrahim Akrin | Indonesia | 1:51.95 | PB |
| 15 | 1 | Midel Dique | Philippines | 1:52.88 | |
| 16 | 2 | Kim Jun-hyung | South Korea | 1:53.38 | |
| 17 | 2 | Grigoriy Aksenov | Kazakhstan | 1:53.47 | |
| 18 | 3 | Dmitriy Tarasenko | Kazakhstan | 1:53.77 | |
| 19 | 1 | Mohamed Sifrath | Sri Lanka | 1:55.51 | |
| 20 | 1 | Eoh Kyung-don | South Korea | 1:57.76 | |
| | 2 | Ehsan Mohajer Shojaei | Iran | DNF | |
| | 2 | Nguyen Dinh Cuong | Vietnam | DNF | |
| | 3 | John Lozada | Philippines | DNF | |

=== Final ===
| Rank | Name | Nationality | Time | Notes |
|---|---|---|---|---|
| 1st place, gold medalist(s) | Majed Saeed Sultan | Qatar | 1:44.27 | AJR, NR |
| 2nd place, silver medalist(s) | Abdulrahman Suleiman | Qatar | 1:44.73 | PB |
| 3rd place, bronze medalist(s) | Sajjad Moradi | Iran | 1:44.74 | NR |
| 4 | Mohammed Al-Salhi | Saudi Arabia | 1:45.78 | |
| 5 | Mohammad Al-Azemi | Kuwait | 1:46.67 | SB |
| 6 | Adnan Taess | Iraq | 1:47.09 | NR |
| 7 | Yoshihiro Shimodaira | Japan | 1:49.45 | |
| 8 | Mohammed Shaween | Saudi Arabia | 1:51.19 | |
