= Athletics at the 2006 Asian Games – Men's 800 metres =

Men's 800 metres at the 2006 Asian Games
- Venue: Khalifa International Stadium
- Dates: 9–11 December 2006
- Competitors: 14 from 12 nations

Medalists
gold medal	Yusuf Saad Kamel	Bahrain
silver medal	Mohammad Al-Azemi	Kuwait
bronze medal	Ehsan Mohajer Shojaei	Iran

The men's 800 metres competition at the 2006 Asian Games in Doha, Qatar was held on 9 and 11 December 2006 at the Khalifa International Stadium.

== Schedule ==
All times are Arabia Standard Time (UTC+03:00)

Date	Time	Event
Saturday, 9 December 2006	17:20	1st round
Monday, 11 December 2006	17:10	Final

== Records ==
Prior to this competition, the existing world, Asian and Games records were as follows.

World Record	Wilson Kipketer (DEN)	1:41.11	Cologne, Germany	24 August 1997
Asian Record	Yusuf Saad Kamel (BRN)	1:43.11	Zurich, Switzerland	6 August 2004
Games Record	Lee Jin-il (KOR)	1:45.72	Hiroshima, Japan	12 October 1994

== Results ==
Legend

- DNF — Did not finish
- DNS — Did not start

=== 1st round ===
- Qualification: First 3 in each heat (Q) and the next 2 fastest (q) advance to the final.

==== Heat 1 ====
Rank	Athlete	Time	Notes
1	Mohammad Al-Azemi (KUW)	1:49.88	Q
2	Yusuf Saad Kamel (BRN)	1:49.94	Q
3	Abdulrahman Suleiman (QAT)	1:50.49	Q
4	Ali Al-Deraan (KSA)	1:50.76	q
5	Nguyễn Đình Cương (VIE)	1:53.30	
6	Suresh Abeynayake (SRI)	1:53.50	
7	Chen Fu-pin (TPE)	1:54.66	

==== Heat 2 ====
Rank	Athlete	Time	Notes
1	Mohammed Al-Salhi (KSA)	1:51.92	Q
2	Ehsan Mohajer Shojaei (IRI)	1:52.18	Q
3	Lee Jae-hun (KOR)	1:52.49	Q
4	Salem Amer Al-Badri (QAT)	1:52.73	q
5	Abdalsalam Al-Dabaji (PLE)	1:54.69	
6	Belal Al-Saari (YEM)	1:57.27	
—	Firdavs Azizov (TJK)	DNS	

=== Final ===
Rank	Athlete	Time	Notes
1st place, gold medalist(s)	Yusuf Saad Kamel (BRN)	1:45.74	
2nd place, silver medalist(s)	Mohammad Al-Azemi (KUW)	1:46.25	
3rd place, bronze medalist(s)	Ehsan Mohajer Shojaei (IRI)	1:47.43	
4	Ali Al-Deraan (KSA)	1:48.48	
5	Abdulrahman Suleiman (QAT)	1:48.62	
6	Mohammed Al-Salhi (KSA)	1:48.95	
7	Lee Jae-hun (KOR)	1:56.69	
—	Salem Amer Al-Badri (QAT)	DNF	
