= Athletics at the 2010 Asian Games – Men's 800 metres =

Men's 800 metres at the 2010 Asian Games
- Venue: Aoti Main Stadium
- Dates: 24–25 November 2010
- Competitors: 22 from 16 nations

Medalists
gold medal	Sajjad Moradi	Iran
silver medal	Adnan Taess	Iraq
bronze medal	Musaeb Abdulrahman Balla	Qatar

The men's 800 metres event at the 2010 Asian Games was held at the Aoti Main Stadium, Guangzhou, China on 24–25 November.

== Schedule ==
All times are China Standard Time (UTC+08:00)

Date	Time	Event
Wednesday, 24 November 2010	18:50	Round 1
Thursday, 25 November 2010	17:40	Final

== Records ==
Prior to this competition, the existing world, Asian and Games records were as follows.

World Record	David Rudisha (KEN)	1:41.11	Rieti, Italy	29 August 2010
Asian Record	Yusuf Saad Kamel (BRN)	1:42.79	Monaco	29 July 2008
Games Record	Lee Jin-il (KOR)	1:45.72	Hiroshima, Japan	12 October 1994

== Results ==
Legend

- DNF — Did not finish
- DNS — Did not start
- DSQ — Disqualified

=== Round 1 ===
- Qualification: First 2 in each heat (Q) and the next 2 fastest (q) advance to the final.

==== Heat 1 ====
Rank	Athlete	Time	Notes
1	Sajjad Moradi (IRI)	1:49.05	Q
2	Masato Yokota (JPN)	1:49.26	Q
3	Sajeesh Joseph (IND)	1:49.58	
4	Zhang Haikun (CHN)	1:50.01	
5	Abdulaziz Ladan (KSA)	1:50.39	
6	Sergey Pakura (KGZ)	1:51.25	
7	Watcharin Waekachi (THA)	1:52.35	
—	Nguyễn Đình Cương (VIE)	DSQ	

==== Heat 2 ====
Rank	Athlete	Time	Notes
1	Adnan Taess (IRQ)	1:49.94	Q
2	Mohammad Al-Azemi (IOC)	1:50.07	Q
3	Francis Sagayaraj (IND)	1:50.18	
4	Geabel Al-Muradi (YEM)	1:53.27	
—	Farkhod Kuralov (TJK)	DSQ	
—	Yusuf Saad Kamel (BRN)	DNS	
DQ	Abdelnasser Awajna (PLE)	~~2:03.93~~	

- Abdelnasser Awajna of Palestine originally finished 5th in the heat, but was later disqualified after he tested positive for Norandrosterone.

==== Heat 3 ====
Rank	Athlete	Time	Notes
1	Mohammed Al-Salhi (KSA)	1:46.47	Q
2	Musaeb Abdulrahman Balla (QAT)	1:46.87	Q
3	Belal Mansoor Ali (BRN)	1:47.37	q
4	Amir Moradi (IRI)	1:47.98	q
5	Yang Xiaofei (CHN)	1:48.02	
6	Saud Abdelkarim (UAE)	1:50.41	
7	Ajmal Amirov (TJK)	1:53.34	

=== Final ===
Rank	Athlete	Time	Notes
1st place, gold medalist(s)	Sajjad Moradi (IRI)	1:45.45	GR
2nd place, silver medalist(s)	Adnan Taess (IRQ)	1:45.88	
3rd place, bronze medalist(s)	Musaeb Abdulrahman Balla (QAT)	1:46.19	
4	Masato Yokota (JPN)	1:46.48	
5	Mohammed Al-Salhi (KSA)	1:46.86	
6	Mohammad Al-Azemi (IOC)	1:47.51	
7	Belal Mansoor Ali (BRN)	1:49.03	
—	Amir Moradi (IRI)	DNF	
