= 2011 Asian Athletics Championships – Men's 800 metres =

Asian sporting event

The men's 800 metres at the 2011 Asian Athletics Championships was held at the Kobe Universiade Memorial Stadium on the 9 and 10 of July.

== Medalists ==
Gold	Mohammad Al-Azemi; Kuwait
Silver	Sajjad Moradi; Iran
Bronze	Ghamnda Ram; India

== Records ==
2011 Asian Athletics Championships
World record	David Rudisha (KEN)	1:41.01	Rieti, Italy	29 August 2010
Asian record	Yusuf Saad Kamel (BHR)	1:42.79	Fontvieille, Monaco	29 July 2008
Championship record	Majed Saeed Sultan (QAT)	1:44.27	Incheon, South Korea	2005

== Results ==
=== Round 1 ===
First 2 in each heat (Q) and 2 best performers (q) advanced to the Final.

Rank	Heat	Name	Nationality	Time	Notes
1	2	Masato Yokota	Japan	1:50.92	Q
2	2	Mohammad Al-Azemi	Kuwait	1:51.14	Q
3	2	Farkhod Kuralov	Tajikistan	1:51.43	q
4	1	Ghamnda Ram	India	1:51.76	Q
5	1	Ehsan Mohajer Shojaei	Iran	1:51.76	Q
6	2	Ali Muhammad	Pakistan	1:51.81	q
7	1	Belal Mansoor Ali	Bahrain	1:52.35	
8	3	Sajeesh Joseph	India	1:52.97	Q
9	3	Sajjad Moradi	Iran	1:53.02	Q
11	3	Takeshi Kuchino	Japan	1:53.46	
12	3	Abdul Haris	Indonesia	1:53.47	
13	1	Mohammed Al-Salhi	Saudi Arabia	1:54.17	
14	1	Vemmiyev Azat	Turkmenistan	1:56.32	
15	3	Nguyễn Đình Cương	Vietnam	1:58.78	
16	2	Hafiy Tajuddin Rositi	Brunei	2:00.58	
17	2	Shifaz Mohamed	Maldives	2:00.61	
18	1	Chittavong Phaisenkon	Laos	2:11.51	

=== Final ===
Rank	Lane	Name	Nationality	Time	Notes
1st place, gold medalist(s)	5	Mohammad Al-Azemi	Kuwait	1:46.14	
2nd place, silver medalist(s)	6	Sajjad Moradi	Iran	1:46.35	
3rd place, bronze medalist(s)	7	Ghamnda Ram	India	1:46.46	
4	4	Masato Yokota	Japan	1:47.05	
5	8	Sajeesh Joseph	India	1:48.56	
6	3	Ehsan Mohajer Shojaei	Iran	1:49.44	
7	9	Farkhod Kuralov	Tajikistan	1:51.13	
8	2	Ali Muhammad	Pakistan	1:56.09	
