= 2013 Asian Athletics Championships – Men's 800 metres =

The men's 800 metres at the 2013 Asian Athletics Championships was held at the Shree Shiv Chhatrapati Sports Complex on the 9th and 10th of July.

== Medalists ==
Gold	Silver	Bronze
Musaeb Abdulrahman Balla; Qatar	Abdulaziz Ladan; Saudi Arabia	Belal Mansoor Ali; Bahrain

== Results ==
=== Heats ===
First 2 in each heat (Q) and 2 best performers (q) advanced to the Final.

Rank	Heat	Name	Nationality	Time	Notes
1	1	Musaeb Abdulrahman Balla	Qatar	1:48.80	Q
2	1	Manjit Singh	India	1:49.12	Q
3	1	Amir Moradi	Iran	1:49.41	q
4	3	Abdulaziz Ladan	Saudi Arabia	1:49.59	Q
5	3	Belal Mansoor Ali	Bahrain	1:49.98	Q
6	1	Masato Yokota	Japan	1:50.16	q
7	3	Takeshi Kuchino	Japan	1:50.57	
8	3	Francis Sagaya Raj	India	1:50.74	
9	3	Hung Yu-Chao	Chinese Taipei	1:51.73	
10	2	Sajjad Moradi	Iran	1:54.74	Q
11	2	Yusuf Saad Kamel	Bahrain	1:54.76	Q
12	2	Jamal Hairane	Qatar	1:54.88	
13	2	Duong Van Thai	Vietnam	1:55.02	
14	2	Sajeesh Joseph	India	1:55.06	
15	2	Adnan Taess	Iraq	1:55.30	
16	1	Geabel Ali Al-Muradi	Yemen	1:57.27	
17	2	Mervin Guarte	Philippines	1:58.44	
18	1	Watcharin Waekachi	Thailand	1:58.69	
19	2	Ahmed Hassan	Maldives	2:01.08	
20	3	Shifaz Mohamed	Maldives	2:02.91	
21	3	Ribeiro de Carvalho	Timor-Leste	2:06.26	
	1	Ak Hafiy Tajuddin Rositi	Brunei	DNF	
	1	Ebrahim Al-Zofauri	Kuwait	DNS	
	3	Mohammad Al-Azemi	Kuwait	DNS	

=== Final ===
Rank	Name	Nationality	Time	Notes
1st place, gold medalist(s)	Musaeb Abdulrahman Balla	Qatar	1:46.92	
2nd place, silver medalist(s)	Abdulaziz Ladan	Saudi Arabia	1:47.01	
3rd place, bronze medalist(s)	Belal Mansoor Ali	Bahrain	1:48.56	
4	Manjit Singh	India	1:49.70	
5	Amir Moradi	Iran	1:50.33	
6	Yusuf Saad Kamel	Bahrain	1:50.54	
7	Masato Yokota	Japan	1:51.13	
8	Sajjad Moradi	Iran	1:56.09	
