= 2015 Asian Athletics Championships – Men's 800 metres =

The men's 800 metres event at the 2015 Asian Athletics Championships was held on the 6 and 7 of June.

== Medalists ==
Gold	Musaeb Abdulrahman Balla; Qatar
Silver	Jinson Johnson; India
Bronze	Sho Kawamoto; Japan

== Results ==
=== Heats ===
First 2 in each heat (Q) and the next 2 fastest (q) qualified for the final.

Rank	Heat	Name	Nationality	Time	Notes
1	2	Jamal Hairane	Qatar	1:50.28	Q
2	2	Sho Kawamoto	Japan	1:50.36	Q
3	2	Belal Mansoor Ali	Bahrain	1:50.51	q
4	3	Musaeb Abdulrahman Balla	Qatar	1:50.80	Q
5	3	Indunilmadushan Idamegedara	Sri Lanka	1:50.88	Q
6	1	Mohammed Obaid Al-Salhi	Saudi Arabia	1:51.52	Q
7	1	Jinson Johnson	India	1:51.55	Q
8	3	Farkhod Kuralov	Tajikistan	1:51.67	q
9	1	Wesam Al-Massri	Palestine	1:51.97	
10	2	Muhammad Ikram	Pakistan	1:52.98	
11	1	Teng Haining	China	1:55.06	
12	2	Herniuslbn Siantar	Indonesia	1:55.52	
13	1	Ebrahim Al-Zofairi	Kuwait	1:55.79	
14	3	Akhyt Asyeikhan	Mongolia	1:57.76	
15	2	Nurgazy Asankulov	Kyrgyzstan	1:59.11	
16	1	Le Hoai Phuong	Vietnam	1:59.79	
17	3	Ahmed Hassan	Maldives	1:59.93	

=== Final ===
Rank	Name	Nationality	Result	Notes
1st place, gold medalist(s)	Musaeb Abdulrahman Balla	Qatar	1:49.40	
2nd place, silver medalist(s)	Jinson Johnson	India	1:49.69	
3rd place, bronze medalist(s)	Sho Kawamoto	Japan	1:50.50	
4	Belal Mansoor Ali	Bahrain	1:51.10	
5	Indunilmadushan Idamegedara	Sri Lanka	1:51.51	
6	Farkhod Kuralov	Tajikistan	1:51.60	
7	Jamal Hairane	Qatar	1:53.76	
8	Mohammed Obaid Al-Salhi	Saudi Arabia	1:53.84	
