= Athletics at the 2011 Arab Games – Results =

These are the official results of the athletics competition at the 2011 Pan Arab Games which took place on 15 – 20 December 2011 in Doha, Qatar.

== Men's results ==
=== 100 meters ===
Heats – 15 December
Wind:
Heat 1: +1.1 m/s, Heat 2: +1.8 m/s, Heat 3: 0.0 m/s

Rank	Heat	Name	Nationality	Time	Notes
1	2	Aziz Ouhadi	Morocco	10.39	Q
2	3	Femi Seun Ogunode	Qatar	10.44	Q
3	1	Barakat Al-Harthi	Oman	10.49	Q
4	2	Yasir Alnashri	Saudi Arabia	10.54	Q
5	2	Abdullah Al-Sooli	Oman	10.63	q
5	3	Amr Ibrahim Mostafa Seoud	Egypt	10.63	Q
7	3	Yahya Habeeb	Saudi Arabia	10.67	q
8	1	Eisa Al-Youhah	Kuwait	10.76	Q
9	1	Hasanain Zubaiyen	Iraq	10.87	
10	3	Ali Omar Al-Doseri	Bahrain	11.13	
11	1	Zuheir El-Menghawi	Libya	11.15	
12	1	Mohamed Abdelazim	Sudan	11.15	
13	3	Salem Al-Hekri	Yemen	11.17	
14	3	Douski Mohamed Houmadi	Comoros	11.51	
15	1	Ahmed Taleb Mohamed Elghassem	Mauritania	11.71	
16	2	Abubaker Tawerghi	Libya	11.97	
	3	Mahmoud Tarda	Palestine	DNF	
	2	Mohamed Ahmed	Somalia	DQ	FS
	2	Elnour Silik	Sudan	DQ	FS
	2	Mohamad Siraj Tamim	Lebanon	DNS	

Final – 15 December
Wind:
+0.4 m/s

Rank	Lane	Name	Nationality	Time	Notes
1st place, gold medalist(s)	5	Femi Seun Ogunode	Qatar	10.37	
2nd place, silver medalist(s)	4	Barakat Al-Harthi	Oman	10.37	SB
3rd place, bronze medalist(s)	3	Aziz Ouhadi	Morocco	10.38	
4	6	Yasir Alnashri	Saudi Arabia	10.47	
5	2	Abdullah Al-Sooli	Oman	10.56	
6	1	Yahya Habeeb	Saudi Arabia	10.59	
7	7	Eisa Al-Youhah	Kuwait	10.87	
8	8	Amr Ibrahim Mostafa Seoud	Egypt	DNS	

=== 200 meters ===
Heats – 18 December
Wind:
Heat 1: +0.4 m/s, Heat 2: 0.0 m/s, Heat 3: 0.0 m/s

Rank	Heat	Name	Nationality	Time	Notes
1	2	Aziz Ouhadi	Morocco	21.16	Q
2	1	Barakat Al-Harthi	Oman	21.27	Q
3	1	Omar Al-Salfa	United Arab Emirates	21.30	Q
3	2	Abdullah Al-Sooli	Oman	21.30	Q
5	2	Mohammed Jumaah	Iraq	21.37	q
6	1	Mahmoud Hafiz Ibrahim	Saudi Arabia	21.46	q
7	2	Abdullah Ahmed Abkar	Saudi Arabia	21.65	
8	3	Femi Seun Ogunode	Qatar	21.68	Q
9	2	Awad El Karim Makki	Sudan	21.89	
10	3	Hasanain Zubaiyen	Iraq	22.05	Q
11	3	Jiddou Khaye El Moctar	Mauritania	23.16	
12	1	Saifelden Ali	Libya	23.38	
13	1	Mohamed Ahmed	Somalia	23.78	
14	2	Douski Mohamed Houmadi	Comoros	23.88	
	3	Nadir Musa	Sudan	DQ	R 168.6
	1	Mahamoud Athoumani	Comoros	DNS	
	1	Ali Omar Al-Doseri	Bahrain	DNS	

Final – 19 December
Wind:
+0.3 m/s

Rank	Lane	Name	Nationality	Time	Notes
1st place, gold medalist(s)	4	Aziz Ouhadi	Morocco	20.69	
2nd place, silver medalist(s)	3	Femi Seun Ogunode	Qatar	21.01	
3rd place, bronze medalist(s)	8	Abdullah Al-Sooli	Oman	21.21	
4	5	Barakat Al-Harthi	Oman	21.22	
5	6	Omar Al-Salfa	United Arab Emirates	21.59	
6	2	Mohammed Jumaah	Iraq	21.63	
7	1	Mahmoud Hafiz Ibrahim	Saudi Arabia	21.92	
	7	Hasanain Zubaiyen	Iraq	DNF	

=== 400 meters ===
Heats – 15 December

Rank	Heat	Name	Nationality	Time	Notes
1	1	Rabah Yousif	Sudan	46.83	Q
2	2	Ahmed Al-Marjibi	Oman	46.84	Q
3	1	Yousef Ahmed Masrahi	Saudi Arabia	46.85	Q
4	2	Sadam Koumi	Sudan	47.20	Q
5	2	Marouane Maadadi	Morocco	47.26	Q
6	2	Mohammed Al-Salhi	Saudi Arabia	47.53	q
7	2	Hassan Aman Salmeen	Qatar	47.75	q
8	1	Abdelkerim Khoudri	Morocco	48.04	Q
9	1	Aymen Mohammed	Iraq	48.12	
10	1	Obaid Al-Quraini	Oman	48.35	
11	1	Gamal Abdelnasir Abubaker	Qatar	48.57	
12	2	Mohamed Khouaja	Libya	48.84	
13	1	Mahamoud Athoumani	Comoros	50.96	
	1	Mohamed Ibrahim	Egypt	DQ	FS
	2	Mohammed Jumaah	Iraq	DQ	FS
	2	Abdalla Mohamed Hussein	Somalia	DNS	

Final – 16 December

Rank	Lane	Name	Nationality	Time	Notes
1st place, gold medalist(s)	4	Yousef Ahmed Masrahi	Saudi Arabia	45.44	SB
2nd place, silver medalist(s)	5	Ahmed Al-Marjibi	Oman	45.84	SB
3rd place, bronze medalist(s)	3	Rabah Yousif	Sudan	45.87	
4	7	Marouane Maadadi	Morocco	46.63	
5	8	Abdelkerim Khoudri	Morocco	47.48	
6	2	Hassan Aman Salmeen	Qatar	47.70	
	1	Mohammed Al-Salhi	Saudi Arabia	DNF	
	6	Sadam Koumi	Sudan	DNF	

=== 800 meters ===
Heats – 15 December

Rank	Heat	Name	Nationality	Time	Notes
1	1	Elnazeir Eltahir Abdel Kader	Sudan	1:48.74	Q
2	2	Abdulaziz Mohammed	Saudi Arabia	1:48.91	Q
3	1	Musaab Bala	Qatar	1:48.98	Q
4	2	Ismail Ahmed Ismail	Sudan	1:49.29	Q
5	2	Belal Mansour Ali	Bahrain	1:49.56	q
6	3	Adnan Al-Mntafage	Iraq	1:50.52	Q
7	3	Hamada Mohamed	Egypt	1:50.60	Q
8	3	Amine El Manaoui	Morocco	1:50.70	q
9	1	Karar Al-Abbody	Iraq	1:53.20	
10	2	Jamal Hairane	Qatar	1:54.19	
11	3	Abdalsalam Aldabaji	Palestine	1:55.79	SB
12	1	Houssein Nour Ali	Djibouti	1:56.13	
13	1	Naser Al-Yarabi	Oman	1:57.43	
14	1	Djamchi Attoumani	Comoros	1:59.67	
15	3	Abdalla Mohamed Hussein	Somalia	2:00.27	
16	2	Abdullahi Barre Kulow	Somalia	2:00.59	
17	3	Youssouf Djae	Comoros	2:06.66	
18	2	Tamer Abu Samaan	Palestine	2:09.70	
19	3	Saleck Ahmed El Khatat	Mauritania	2:16.85	
	1	Fares Hassan	Libya	DNS	

Final – 17 December

Rank	Name	Nationality	Time	Notes
1st place, gold medalist(s)	Musaab Bala	Qatar	1:45.92	PB
2nd place, silver medalist(s)	Ismail Ahmed Ismail	Sudan	1:46.60	
3rd place, bronze medalist(s)	Adnan Al-Mntafage	Iraq	1:47.18	
4	Elnazeir Eltahir Abdel Kader	Sudan	1:47.28	
5	Hamada Mohamed	Egypt	1:48.08	
6	Belal Mansour Ali	Bahrain	1:50.08	
	Abdulaziz Mohammed	Saudi Arabia	DQ	R 163.5
	Amine El Manaoui	Morocco	DNF	

=== 1500 meters ===
Heats – 19 December

Rank	Heat	Name	Nationality	Time	Notes
1	2	Hassan Ayanleh	Djibouti	3:47.31	Q
2	2	Belal Mansour Ali	Bahrain	3:47.53	Q
3	2	Hamza Driouch	Qatar	3:47.69	Q
4	2	Abderrahmane Anou	Algeria	3:47.92	Q
5	2	Adnan Al-Mntafage	Iraq	3:48.41	q
6	2	Abdulla Abdelgadir	Sudan	3:48.87	q
7	1	Mohamad Al-Garni	Qatar	3:49.29	Q
8	2	Abdulaziz Mohammed	Saudi Arabia	3:49.51	q
9	1	Emad Noor	Saudi Arabia	3:49.68	Q
10	1	Alemu Bekele Gebre	Bahrain	3:49.72	Q
11	2	Omar Al-Rasheedi	Kuwait	3:49.75	q
12	1	Hicham Sigueni	Morocco	3:49.81	Q
13	1	Osman Omer	Sudan	3:49.82	
14	1	Mohamed Hassan Mohamed	Somalia	3:56.98	
15	1	Nabil Al-Garbi	Yemen	4:00.43	
16	2	Abdullahi Barre Kulow	Somalia	4:08.17	
17	2	Abdelhamed Taher	Libya	4:11.16	
18	1	Mohaned Elourfi	Libya	4:16.86	
	2	Hamada Ahmed	Egypt	DNF	
	1	Djamchi Attoumani	Comoros	DNS	
	1	Amor Ben Yahia	Tunisia	DNS	

Final – 20 December

Rank	Name	Nationality	Time	Notes
1st place, gold medalist(s)	Hassan Ayanleh	Djibouti	3:34.32	SB
2nd place, silver medalist(s)	Hamza Driouch	Qatar	3:34.43	PB
3rd place, bronze medalist(s)	Mohamad Al-Garni	Qatar	3:34.61	PB
4	Belal Mansour Ali	Bahrain	3:38.61	SB
5	Emad Noor	Saudi Arabia	3:39.94	
6	Alemu Bekele Gebre	Bahrain	3:40.83	PB
7	Abdulla Abdelgadir	Sudan	3:41.38	
8	Omar Al-Rasheedi	Kuwait	3:41.47	SB
9	Hicham Sigueni	Morocco	3:42.21	
	Abderrahmane Anou	Algeria	DNF	
	Adnan Al-Mntafage	Iraq	DNF	
	Abdulaziz Mohammed	Saudi Arabia	DNF	

=== 5000 meters ===
20 December

Rank	Name	Nationality	Time	Notes
1st place, gold medalist(s)	Soufian Bouqantar	Morocco	13:45.81	
2nd place, silver medalist(s)	Ali Hasan Mahboob	Bahrain	13:46.32	
3rd place, bronze medalist(s)	Moukheld Al-Outaibi	Saudi Arabia	13:46.62	
4	Bilisuma Shugi	Bahrain	13:47.91	
5	Mumin Gala	Djibouti	13:50.43	
6	Nader Alnassri	Palestine	14:33.49	SB
7	Abdishakur Nageye Abdulle	Somalia	14:43.71	
8	Mohamed Hassan Mohamed	Somalia	15:03.15	
9	Mouhamadi Daou Bacar	Comoros	16:11.91	
	Abubaker Ali Kamal	Qatar	DQ ~~(13:45.60)~~	Doping
	His Youssouf	Djibouti	DNF	
	Rabah Aboud	Algeria	DNS	
	Abdelmunaim Adam	Sudan	DNS	
	Nayel Atyia	Sudan	DNS	

=== 10,000 meters ===
16 December

Rank	Name	Nationality	Time	Notes
1st place, gold medalist(s)	Ali Hasan Mahboob	Bahrain	28:39.88	
2nd place, silver medalist(s)	Mumin Gala	Djibouti	28:43.32	
3rd place, bronze medalist(s)	Bilisuma Shugi	Bahrain	28:44.10	
4	Abdullah Abdulaziz Aljoud	Saudi Arabia	29:24.89	
5	Nayel Atyia	Sudan	29:29.42	
6	Jaouad Laaris	Morocco	29:42.17	
7	Adil Rached	Morocco	29:55.67	
8	Abdishakur Nageye Abdulle	Somalia	31:25.65	
	Rabah Aboud	Algeria	DNF	

=== Half marathon ===
16 December

Rank	Name	Nationality	Time	Notes
1st place, gold medalist(s)	Rachid Kisri	Morocco	1:04:03	
2nd place, silver medalist(s)	Khalid Kamal Yaseen	Bahrain	1:04:31	
3rd place, bronze medalist(s)	Wissam Hosni	Tunisia	1:04:37	
4	Mohammed Abduh Bakhet	Qatar	1:05:16	
5	Ahmed Hawli	Sudan	1:07:40	
6	Nasir Kabngo	Sudan	1:07:43	
7	Salim Al-Shukaili	Oman	1:15:07	

=== 110 meters hurdles ===
Heats – 19 December
Wind:
Heat 1: +1.1 m/s, Heat 2: -0.4 m/s

Rank	Heat	Name	Nationality	Time	Notes
1	2	Othmane Hadj Lazib	Algeria	13.75	Q
2	2	Abdulaziz Al-Mandeel	Kuwait	13.78	Q, SB
3	2	Ali Hussain Al-Zaki	Saudi Arabia	14.17	Q
4	1	Rami Kareem	Iraq	14.19	Q, PB
5	1	Ahmad Al-Molad	Saudi Arabia	14.38	Q
6	2	Jalal Al-Ghabashi	Oman	14.83	q
7	1	Ahmad Hazer	Lebanon	14.93	Q
8	1	Lyes Mokddel	Algeria	16.07	q
	1	Fawaz Al-Shammari	Kuwait	DNF	

Final – 20 December
Wind:
+0.4 m/s

Rank	Lane	Name	Nationality	Time	Notes
1st place, gold medalist(s)	3	Ahmad Al-Molad	Saudi Arabia	13.60	NR
2nd place, silver medalist(s)	4	Othmane Hadj Lazib	Algeria	13.74	
3rd place, bronze medalist(s)	4	Abdulaziz Al-Mandeel	Kuwait	13.78	
4	2	Lyes Mokddel	Algeria	13.81	PB
5	8	Ali Hussain Al-Zaki	Saudi Arabia	13.94	
6	5	Rami Kareem	Iraq	14.16	PB
7	7	Ahmad Hazer	Lebanon	14.70	
8	1	Jalal Al-Ghabashi	Oman	15.13	

=== 400 meters hurdles ===
Heats – 16 December

Rank	Heat	Name	Nationality	Time	Notes
1	1	Bandar Sharahili	Saudi Arabia	51.64	Q
2	1	Jasem Waleed Al-Mas	Kuwait	51.68	Q, PB
3	2	Hassan Akabbou	Morocco	51.92	Q
4	2	Hafiz Mohamed	Sudan	52.08	Q
5	2	Mohamed Sgaier	Tunisia	52.29	Q
6	1	Miloud Rahmani	Algeria	52.69	Q
7	1	Abdullah Al-Hidi	Oman	52.83	q
8	2	Mustafa Shaheen	Iraq	52.93	q
9	2	Ibrahim Mohammed Saleh	Saudi Arabia	53.11	
10	1	Abdel Gadir Idris	Sudan	56.15	
	1	Ali Shirook	United Arab Emirates	DNS	

Final – 17 December

Rank	Lane	Name	Nationality	Time	Notes
1st place, gold medalist(s)	6	Bandar Sharahili	Saudi Arabia	50.63	
2nd place, silver medalist(s)	8	Miloud Rahmani	Algeria	51.03	
3rd place, bronze medalist(s)	7	Mohamed Sgaier	Tunisia	51.27	
4	4	Jasem Waleed Al-Mas	Kuwait	51.59	PB
5	3	Hassan Akabbou	Morocco	52.13	
6	1	Abdullah Al-Hidi	Oman	52.58	
7	5	Hafiz Mohamed	Sudan	52.81	
8	2	Mustafa Shaheen	Iraq	52.94	

=== 3000 meters steeplechase ===
15 December

Rank	Name	Nationality	Time	Notes
1st place, gold medalist(s)	Hamid Ezzine	Morocco	8:38.37	
2nd place, silver medalist(s)	Tareq Mubarak Taher	Bahrain	8:39.25	SB
3rd place, bronze medalist(s)	Dejenee Mootumaa	Bahrain	8:39.53	
4	Amor Ben Yahia	Tunisia	8:47.18	
5	Mohamed-Khaled Belabbas	Algeria	8:49.94	
6	Idris Yousif	Sudan	8:54.07	
7	Maaz Abdelrahman Shagag	Qatar	9:10.74	
	Abubaker Ali Kamal	Qatar	DQ ~~(8:36.82)~~	Doping

=== 4 × 100 meters relay ===
20 December

Rank	Lane	Nation	Athletes	Time	Notes
1st place, gold medalist(s)	3	Saudi Arabia	Yahya Habeeb, Yasir Alnashri, Mahmoud Hafiz Ibrahim, Ahmad Al-Molad	39.67	
2nd place, silver medalist(s)	5	Oman	Fahad Al-Jabri, Barakat Al-Harthi, Abdullah Al-Sooli, Yahya Al-Noufali	39.84	
3rd place, bronze medalist(s)	4	United Arab Emirates	Hussain Al-Blooshi, Ahmed Al-Zaabi, Bilal Al-Salfa, Omar Al-Salfa	40.15	
4	6	Iraq	Aymen Mohammed, Hasanain Zubaiyen, Ahmed Husam, Mohammed Jumaah	40.46	
5	1	Kuwait	Fawaz Al-Shammari, Abdulaziz Al-Mandeel, Eisa Al-Youhah, Saleh Al-Haddad	41.04	
6	2	Sudan	Elnour Silik, Ahmed Eltahir, Mohamed Abdelazim, Awad El Karim Makki	42.17	
	7	Qatar	Saif Sabbah Khalifa, Alwaleed Abdulla Abdulla, Eid Abdulla Al-Kuwari, Ali Hassan Al-Jassim	DQ	R 170.6
	8	Libya		DNS	

=== 4 × 400 meters relay ===
20 December

Rank	Nation	Athletes	Time	Notes
1st place, gold medalist(s)	Saudi Arabia	Hamed Al-Bishi, Mohammed Al-Salhi, Mohammed Al-Bishi, Yousef Ahmed Masrahi	3:07.22	
2nd place, silver medalist(s)	Sudan	Rabah Yousif, Elnazeir Eltahir Abdel Kader, Hafiz Mohamed, Ismail Ahmed Ismail	3:07.47	
3rd place, bronze medalist(s)	Oman	Yahya Al-Noufali, Obaid Al-Quraini, Abdullah Al-Hidi, Ahmed Al-Marjibi	3:08.54	
4	Morocco	Younes Belkaifa, Abdelkerim Khoudri, Hassan Akabbou, Marouane El Maadadi	3:08.89	
5	Iraq	Aymen Mohammed, Karar Al-Abbody, Ahmed Husam, Mohammed Jumaah	3:09.55	
	Comoros		DNS	
	Qatar		DNS	

=== 20 kilometers walk ===
15 December

Rank	Name	Nationality	Time	Notes
1st place, gold medalist(s)	Hassanine Sebei	Tunisia	1:28:20	
2nd place, silver medalist(s)	Mabrook Saleh Nasser Mohamed	Qatar	1:31:02	
3rd place, bronze medalist(s)	Ali Daghiri	Morocco	1:34:59	
4	Hussein Mohammed Al-Khairi	Qatar	1:44:36	
5	Hedi Teraoui	Tunisia	1:45:54	
	Hichem Medjeber	Algeria	DQ	R 230.6A
	Ameer Abed	Iraq	DNF	

=== High jump ===
16 December

Rank	Athlete	Nationality	1.95	2.00	2.05	2.10	2.15	2.18	2.21	2.24	2.27	2.30	2.33	Result	Notes
1st place, gold medalist(s)	Mutaz Essa Barshim	Qatar	–	–	–	o	o	o	o	o	o	o	x–	2.30	
2nd place, silver medalist(s)	Mohamed Idris	Sudan	–	–	o	o	xo	o	xo	o	xxx			2.24	
3rd place, bronze medalist(s)	Rashid Ahmed Al-Mannai	Qatar	–	–	xo	o	xxo	–	o	x–	xx			2.21	
4	Nawaf Al-Yami	Saudi Arabia	–	o	o	xxx								2.05	
4	Sayed Ali Al-Awi	United Arab Emirates	o	o	o	xxx								2.05	
6	Ebrahim Al-Enezi	Kuwait	xo	xo	xxx									2.00	
7	Ibrahim Ahmed Ajlan	Saudi Arabia	–	xxo	xxx									2.00	

=== Pole vault ===
17 December

Rank	Athlete	Nationality	3.80	3.95	4.40	4.50	4.60	4.70	4.80	4.90	5.00	5.05	5.10	5.25	Result	Notes
1st place, gold medalist(s)	Mouhcine Cheaouri	Morocco	–	–	–	–	–	–	o	–	xo	–	xxo	xxx	5.10	
2nd place, silver medalist(s)	Sami Berhaiem	Tunisia	–	–	–	–	–	o	–	xxo	–	xxo	xxx		5.05	PB
3rd place, bronze medalist(s)	Fahad Al-Mershad	Kuwait	–	–	–	–	–	xo	–	xo	–	xxx			4.90	
4	Hamdi Dhouibi	Tunisia	–	–	–	o	–	o	–	xxx					4.70	
4	Samir El Mafhoum	Morocco	–	–	–	–	–	o	–	xxx					4.70	
6	Rashid Al-Ali	Qatar	o	xxx											3.80	
	Saleh Al-Shemali	Kuwait	–	–	–	–	xxx								NM	
	Mourad Souissi	Algeria	–	–	xxx										NM	

=== Long jump ===
17 December

Rank	Athlete	Nationality	#1	#2	#3	#4	#5	#6	Result	Notes
1st place, gold medalist(s)	Saleh Al-Haddad	Kuwait	7.67	7.82	7.83	7.77	7.71	7.65	7.83	SB
2nd place, silver medalist(s)	Mohamed Gawy	Egypt	7.62	4.33	7.81	7.61	x	x	7.81	
3rd place, bronze medalist(s)	Hussain Taher Al-Saba	Saudi Arabia	7.59	x	x	7.57	7.57	x	7.59	
4	Issam Nima	Algeria	7.20	7.47	x	7.24	x	7.56	7.56	
5	Ala Ben Hsine	Tunisia	7.21	x	7.34	7.42	7.40	7.56	7.56	
6	Abdelhakim Mlaab	Morocco	7.17	x	7.18	7.51	7.46	7.22	7.51	
7	Eisa Buhadi	Kuwait	7.17	5.38	6.91	7.03	x	7.01	7.17	
8	Ali Al-Rashdi	Oman	x	6.52	6.76	6.67	x	6.78	6.78	
	Mohamed Salman Al-Khuwalidi	Saudi Arabia							DNS	

=== Triple jump ===
20 December

Rank	Athlete	Nationality	#1	#2	#3	#4	#5	#6	Result	Notes
1st place, gold medalist(s)	Issam Nima	Algeria	15.89	16.46	16.32	16.59	x	16.02	16.59	
2nd place, silver medalist(s)	Mohammad Darwish	United Arab Emirates	x	16.41	16.37	16.19	16.24	16.15	16.41	
3rd place, bronze medalist(s)	Tarik Bouguetaïb	Morocco	x	x	x	13.90	16.05	16.33	16.33	
4	Ammr Shouman	Egypt	15.69	15.95	15.90	16.10	15.68	15.79	16.10	SB
5	Hassan Dawshi	Saudi Arabia	x	15.21	x	14.98	14.86	15.04	15.21	
	Mohamed Elamari	Libya	x	x	x	x	x	x	NM	

=== Shot put ===
19 December

Rank	Athlete	Nationality	#1	#2	#3	#4	#5	#6	Result	Notes
1st place, gold medalist(s)	Yasser Ibrahim Farag	Egypt	18.80	19.44	19.27	18.90	x	18.85	19.44	
2nd place, silver medalist(s)	Ahmad Gholoum	Kuwait	18.16	x	18.28	x	18.74	18.23	18.74	SB
3rd place, bronze medalist(s)	Khalid Habash Al-Suwaidi	Qatar	16.58	17.26	17.79	x	x	x	17.79	
4	Mashari Mohammad	Kuwait	x	17.73	x	17.76	x	17.59	17.76	
5	Mohammed Gharrous	Morocco	16.37	16.74	x	16.39	16.89	16.81	16.89	
6	Musab Momani	Jordan	x	x	12.90	x	16.68	x	16.68	
7	Khalid Abdullah Kidallah	Saudi Arabia	16.11	15.77	16.36	16.42	16.48	16.54	16.54	SB
8	Mohammed Omar Abdulqadri	Saudi Arabia	15.58	16.31	15.98	15.62	15.48	15.89	16.31	
	Ahmed Mohammad	United Arab Emirates	x	x	x				NM	

=== Discus throw ===
17 December

Rank	Athlete	Nationality	#1	#2	#3	#4	#5	#6	Result	Notes
1st place, gold medalist(s)	Rashid Shafi Al-Dosari	Qatar	60.55	x	62.29	61.30	58.19	x	62.29	SB
2nd place, silver medalist(s)	Yasser Ibrahim Farag	Egypt	56.20	59.07	x	60.47	x	x	60.47	
3rd place, bronze medalist(s)	Musab Momani	Jordan	53.20	58.95	56.23	54.08	57.24	x	58.95	
4	Haider Jabreen	Iraq	x	57.54	58.11	x	x	x	58.11	
5	Sultan Mubarak Al-Dawoodi	Saudi Arabia	56.39	x	x	x	x	57.44	57.44	
6	Essa Al-Zenkawi	Kuwait	53.49	55.80	55.34	55.89	54.15	55.06	55.89	PB
7	Ali Ali	Libya	x	51.32	53.53	x	53.19	x	53.53	
8	Osama Hassan Al-Oqayli	Saudi Arabia	41.66	43.94	44.14	43.33	45.28	44.68	45.28	

=== Hammer throw ===
15 December

Rank	Athlete	Nationality	#1	#2	#3	#4	#5	#6	Result	Notes
1st place, gold medalist(s)	Ali Al-Zinkawi	Kuwait	73.29	x	71.00	71.00	72.09	71.67	73.29	
2nd place, silver medalist(s)	Mostafa Al-Gamel	Egypt	68.56	x	67.59	70.23	68.20	x	70.23	
3rd place, bronze medalist(s)	Hassan Mohamed Mahmoud	Egypt	65.09	64.44	64.90	67.72	66.11	68.22	68.22	
4	Mohammad Al-Jawhar	Kuwait	x	x	x	61.64	65.29	x	65.29	
5	Ismail Mohamad Kassem	Qatar	56.94	55.80	56.94	54.08	55.41	55.87	56.94	
	Haider Jabreen	Iraq	x	–	–	–	–	–	DNF	

=== Javelin throw ===
16 December

Rank	Athlete	Nationality	#1	#2	#3	#4	#5	#6	Result	Notes
1st place, gold medalist(s)	Ehab Abdelrahman	Egypt	72.91	78.66	75.68	76.01	74.65	78.31	78.66	
2nd place, silver medalist(s)	Ahmed El Shabramlsy	Egypt	71.23	67.37	70.05	68.41	70.10	70.11	71.23	
3rd place, bronze medalist(s)	Ammar Al-Najm	Iraq	68.93	69.59	70.36	67.94	x	70.03	70.36	SB
4	Abdullah Al-Ameeri	Kuwait	64.61	65.68	x	62.87	68.09	x	68.09	
5	Abdullah Al-Ghamdi	Saudi Arabia	56.73	61.81	x	62.56	62.40	61.20	62.56	
6	Mohamed Driouchi	Morocco	58.50	60.94	x	x	–	–	60.94	
7	Khamis Al-Qatiti	Oman	x	60.49	x	58.89	60.76	x	60.76	
8	Abdullah Al-Sharidah	Saudi Arabia	56.42	56.97	x	55.95	56.70	56.76	56.97	

=== Decathlon ===
December 19–20

The highest mark recorded in each event is highlighted in yellow

Rank	Athlete	Nationality	100m	LJ	SP	HJ	400m	110m H	DT	PV	JT	1500m	Points	Notes
1st place, gold medalist(s)	Mohammed Al-Qaree	Saudi Arabia	10.60	7.12	12.67	2.00	49.41	14.36	38.88	4.30	58.30	4:52.19	7677	SB
2nd place, silver medalist(s)	Hamdi Dhouibi	Tunisia	11.03	7.01	13.75	1.85	49.89	15.13	42.64	4.90	50.10	4:26.37	7664	
3rd place, bronze medalist(s)	Mourad Souissi	Algeria	11.38	6.72	14.28	1.82	50.86	15.01	41.45	4.20	54.48	4:43.27	7220	
4	Ali Hazer	Lebanon	11.17	6.63	11.91	1.79	50.35	15.86	35.24	3.50	45.62	4:49.22	6515	
	Hashim Nizar Al-Sharfa	Saudi Arabia	11.35	6.71	10.78	DNS	–	–	–	–	–	–	DNF	

== Women's results ==
=== 100 meters ===
Heats – 15 December
Wind:
Heat 1: +0.8 m/s, Heat 2: -1.0 m/s

Rank	Heat	Name	Nationality	Time	Notes
1	1	Danah Abdulrazzaq	Iraq	12.01	Q, SB
2	2	Gretta Taslakian	Lebanon	12.04	Q
3	1	Salima Jamali	Morocco	12.09	Q
4	2	Jamaa Chnaik	Morocco	12.13	Q
5	1	Ahamada Feta	Comoros	12.18	Q
6	2	Nadia Sadia Remaoun	Algeria	12.41	Q
7	1	Baya Rahouli	Algeria	12.51	q
8	2	Shinoona Al-Habsi	Oman	12.98	q (12.978)
9	1	Noor Hussain Al-Malki	Qatar	12.98	(12.977)
10	2	Hala Gezah	Libya	13.34	
11	1	Dhai Al-Mulla	Kuwait	13.81	
12	2	Fatma Belkir	Libya	16.12	

Final – 15 December
Wind:
+0.3 m/s

Rank	Lane	Name	Nationality	Time	Notes
1st place, gold medalist(s)	5	Danah Abdulrazzaq	Iraq	11.88	NR
2nd place, silver medalist(s)	3	Gretta Taslakian	Lebanon	11.96	
3rd place, bronze medalist(s)	4	Jamaa Chnaik	Morocco	12.08	
4	8	Ahamada Feta	Comoros	12.38	
5	1	Shinoona Al-Habsi	Oman	13.09	
	6	Salima Jamali	Morocco	DNF	
	2	Baya Rahouli	Algeria	DQ	FS
	2	Nadia Sadia Remaoun	Algeria	DQ	FS

=== 200 meters ===
Heats – 18 December
Wind:
Heat 1: +0.1 m/s, Heat 2: 0.0 m/s

Rank	Heat	Name	Nationality	Time	Notes
1	2	Gretta Taslakian	Lebanon	24.18	Q
2	1	Danah Abdulrazzaq	Iraq	24.58	Q
3	2	Fayza Omer	Sudan	25.18	Q
4	1	Ghita El Kafy	Morocco	25.31	Q
5	2	Ahamada Feta	Comoros	25.58	Q. SB
6	1	Souhir Louahala	Algeria	25.64	Q
7	2	Shinoona Al-Habsi	Oman	26.84	q
8	1	Noor Hussain Al-Malki	Qatar	26.95	q
	1	Nawal El Jack	Sudan	DQ	FS
	2	Salima Jamali	Morocco	DQ	FS

Final – 19 December
Wind:
+0.6 m/s

Rank	Lane	Name	Nationality	Time	Notes
1st place, gold medalist(s)	4	Gretta Taslakian	Lebanon	24.10	
2nd place, silver medalist(s)	3	Danah Abdulrazzaq	Iraq	24.61	
3rd place, bronze medalist(s)	5	Fayza Omer	Sudan	25.20	
4	6	Ghita El Kafy	Morocco	25.54	
5	8	Souhir Louahala	Algeria	25.61	
6	7	Ahamada Feta	Comoros	25.69	
7	2	Shinoona Al-Habsi	Oman	26.99	
8	1	Noor Hussain Al-Malki	Qatar	27.23	

=== 400 meters ===
Heats – 15 December

Rank	Heat	Name	Nationality	Time	Notes
1	2	Malika Akkaoui	Morocco	55.27	Q
2	1	Malika Abakil	Morocco	55.53	Q
3	1	Alaa Hikmat	Iraq	55.63	Q
4	2	Nawal El Jack	Sudan	56.14	Q
5	2	Fayza Omer	Sudan	56.82	Q
6	1	Fassila Fnides	Algeria	57.06	Q
7	2	Danah Abdulrazzaq	Iraq	57.56	q
8	1	Djamila Bensalem	Algeria	58.12	q
9	2	Saria Traboulsi	Lebanon	1:00.94	
10	1	Nagah Zentani	Libya	1:04.12	

Final – 16 December

Rank	Lane	Name	Nationality	Time	Notes
1st place, gold medalist(s)	6	Malika Akkaoui	Morocco	53.94	PB
2nd place, silver medalist(s)	3	Nawal El Jack	Sudan	55.14	
3rd place, bronze medalist(s)	2	Danah Abdulrazzaq	Iraq	55.48	
4	4	Alaa Hikmat	Iraq	56.12	
5	7	Fassila Fnides	Algeria	56.15	PB
6	8	Fayza Omer	Sudan	56.80	
7	1	Djamila Bensalem	Algeria	58.98	
8	5	Malika Abakil	Morocco	2:02.96	

=== 800 meters ===
19 December

Rank	Name	Nationality	Time	Notes
1st place, gold medalist(s)	Malika Akkaoui	Morocco	2:02.42	
2nd place, silver medalist(s)	Genzeb Shumi Regasa	Bahrain	2:07.19	
3rd place, bronze medalist(s)	Malika Abakil	Morocco	2:07.57	
4	Amna Bakhait	Sudan	2:13.84	SB
5	Amina Bettiche	Algeria	2:15.15	
6	Saria Traboulsi	Lebanon	2:21.91	
7	Alawia Andal	Sudan	2:24.46	
8	Souhra Ali	Djibouti	2:27.19	PB
	Aichetou Fall Bilal	Mauritania	DNF	

=== 1500 meters ===
15 December

Rank	Name	Nationality	Time	Notes
1st place, gold medalist(s)	Genzeb Shumi Regasa	Bahrain	4:20.07	
2nd place, silver medalist(s)	Siham Hilali	Morocco	4:20.83	
3rd place, bronze medalist(s)	Betlhem Belayneh	United Arab Emirates	4:21.50	
4	Amina Bettiche	Algeria	4:26.61	
5	Aster Tesfaye	Bahrain	4:27.52	PB
6	Ehssan Arbab	Sudan	4:30.14	
	Hanane Ouhaddou	Morocco	DNF	
	Alia Saeed	United Arab Emirates	DNS	

=== 5000 meters ===
19 December

Rank	Name	Nationality	Time	Notes
1st place, gold medalist(s)	Alia Saeed	United Arab Emirates	16:11.54	
2nd place, silver medalist(s)	Betlhem Belayneh	United Arab Emirates	16:12.71	
3rd place, bronze medalist(s)	Shitaye Eshete	Bahrain	16:15.26	
4	Hanane Ouhaddou	Morocco	16:19.64	
5	Ehssan Arbab	Sudan	16:21.52	
6	Salima El Ouali Alami	Morocco	16:22.85	
7	Tejitu Daba Chalchissa	Bahrain	16:55.10	
	Souad Aït Salem	Algeria	DNS	

=== 10,000 meters ===
15 December

Rank	Name	Nationality	Time	Notes
1st place, gold medalist(s)	Tejitu Daba Chalchissa	Bahrain	33:09.18	
2nd place, silver medalist(s)	Shitaye Eshete	Bahrain	33:09.19	
3rd place, bronze medalist(s)	Amna Bakhait	Sudan	33:27.76	
4	Kaltoum Bouayssiriya	Morocco	33:28.58	PB
	Salima El Ouali Alami	Morocco	DNF	

=== Half marathon ===
16 December

Rank	Name	Nationality	Time	Notes
1st place, gold medalist(s)	Lishan Dula	Bahrain	1:14:18	
2nd place, silver medalist(s)	Kareema Jasim	Bahrain	1:14:31	
3rd place, bronze medalist(s)	Samira Raïf	Morocco	1:14:35	
4	Souad Aït Salem	Algeria	1:15:13	

=== 100 meters hurdles ===
15 December
Wind: 0.0 m/s

Rank	Name	Nationality	Time	Notes
1st place, gold medalist(s)	Lamiae Lhabze	Morocco	13.88	PB
2nd place, silver medalist(s)	Amina Ferguen	Algeria	13.98	
3rd place, bronze medalist(s)	Roumeissa Belabiod	Algeria	14.37	
4	Salma Elsayed	Egypt	14.53	

=== 400 meters hurdles ===
17 December

Rank	Name	Nationality	Time	Notes
1st place, gold medalist(s)	Hayat Lambarki	Morocco	56.72	SB
2nd place, silver medalist(s)	Lamiae Lhabze	Morocco	57.55	
3rd place, bronze medalist(s)	Tasabih Mohamed	Sudan	1:00.00	
4	Houria Moussa	Algeria	1:00.41	
5	Alaa Hikmat	Iraq	1:01.91	

=== 4 × 100 meters relay ===
20 December

Rank	Lane	Nation	Athletes	Time	Notes
1st place, gold medalist(s)	4	Morocco	Jamaa Chnaik, Hayat Lambarki, Ghita El Kafy, Salima Jamali	46.16	
2nd place, silver medalist(s)	6	Egypt	Radwa Fadl, Salma Elsayed, Wedian Hussain, Enas Mansour	48.87	
3rd place, bronze medalist(s)	5	Qatar	Nada Nabil Abdalla, Fatemeh Mazaher Sassanipoor, Reyma Alen Thomas, Noor Hussain Al-Malki	52.10	
	3	Algeria	Kheira Fatima Zohra Bourahla, Souhir Louahala, Nadia Sadia Remaoun, Amina Ferguen	DNF	

=== 4 × 400 meters relay ===
20 December

Rank	Nation	Athletes	Time	Notes
1st place, gold medalist(s)	Morocco	Lamiae Lhabze, Malika Akkaoui, Malika Abakil, Hayat Lambarki	3:38.64	
2nd place, silver medalist(s)	Sudan	Nawal El Jack, Alawia Andal, Fayza Omer, Tasabih Mohamed	3:45.91	
3rd place, bronze medalist(s)	Algeria	Fassila Fnides, Djamila Bensalem, Asma Amar-Belhadj, Houria Moussa	3:50.36	

=== 10,000 meters walk ===
15 December

Rank	Name	Nationality	Time	Notes
1st place, gold medalist(s)	Chaïma Trabelsi	Tunisia	48:17.91	PB
2nd place, silver medalist(s)	Olfa Lafi	Tunisia	50:07.49	PB
3rd place, bronze medalist(s)	Nazha Ezzhani	Morocco	54:08.32	
	Meshref Gehad	Egypt	DQ	R 230.6A

=== High jump ===
17 December

Rank	Athlete	Nationality	1.55	1.60	1.65	1.70	1.73	1.76	1.79	Result	Notes
1st place, gold medalist(s)	Rhizlane Siba	Morocco	–	–	o	o	o	xo	xxx	1.76	
2nd place, silver medalist(s)	Basant Ibrahim	Egypt	–	o	o	o	o	xxo	xxx	1.76	
3rd place, bronze medalist(s)	Maryam Mohamed Al-Ansari	Bahrain	o	o	o	o	xxx			1.70	PB
4	Dounia Menni	Morocco	o	xo	o	xxx				1.65	
	Katia Amokrane	Algeria								DNS	

=== Pole vault ===
20 December

Rank	Athlete	Nationality	3.00	3.10	3.20	3.30	3.40	3.50	3.60	3.65	3.70	3.91	4.00	Result	Notes
1st place, gold medalist(s)	Nisrine Dinar	Morocco	–	–	–	–	o	–	o	–	o	xxo	xxx	3.91	SB
2nd place, silver medalist(s)	Dorra Mahfoudi	Tunisia	–	–	o	–	o	o	xo	xo	xxx			3.65	PB
3rd place, bronze medalist(s)	Dina Eltabaa	Egypt	o	o	o	o	xxx							3.30	

=== Long jump ===
16 December

Rank	Athlete	Nationality	#1	#2	#3	#4	#5	#6	Result	Notes
1st place, gold medalist(s)	Roumeissa Belabiod	Algeria	6.02	x	5.89	x	x	6.07	6.07	
2nd place, silver medalist(s)	Enas Mansour	Egypt	5.95	5.84	5.74	6.03	6.00	5.86	6.03	SB
3rd place, bronze medalist(s)	Jamaa Chnaik	Morocco	x	5.86	x	x	x	5.66	5.86	
4	Christel El Saneh	Lebanon	5.23	5.00	5.08	5.01	4.77	4.94	5.23	
5	Reyma Alen Thomas	Qatar	x	x	x	x	5.01	x	5.01	
6	Ghada Ali	Libya	4.63	4.65	4.65	4.60	4.61	4.60	4.65	
	Fatma Lahmedi	Tunisia	x	x	–	–	–	–	DNF	

=== Triple jump ===
19 December

Rank	Athlete	Nationality	#1	#2	#3	#4	#5	#6	Result	Notes
1st place, gold medalist(s)	Baya Rahouli	Algeria	13.64	13.57w	14.01	–	–	–	14.01	
2nd place, silver medalist(s)	Enas Mansour	Egypt	x	12.71	12.76	12.79	12.80	12.61	12.80	
3rd place, bronze medalist(s)	Jamaa Chnaik	Morocco	12.76w	12.68	x	x	12.60	12.60	12.76w	
4	Fatma Lahmedi	Tunisia	x	12.28	x	12.28	x	12.32	12.32	
	Reyma Alen Thomas	Qatar	x	x	x	x	x	x	NM	

=== Shot put ===
16 December

Rank	Athlete	Nationality	#1	#2	#3	#4	#5	#6	Result	Notes
1st place, gold medalist(s)	Walaa Eldakak	Egypt	14.92	14.06	14.81	14.50	14.73	x	14.92	SB
2nd place, silver medalist(s)	Fadya Elkasaby	Egypt	13.62	14.28	14.67	14.03	x	x	14.67	
3rd place, bronze medalist(s)	Sihem Marrakchi	Tunisia	13.36	13.19	14.27	14.09	x	x	14.27	
4	Zouina Bouzebra	Algeria	12.35	12.37	12.22	x	x	–	12.37	
5	Arig Asaiah	Libya	9.91	9.72	10.71	x	10.30	10.47	10.71	
6	Basma Mohamed Abdoh	Bahrain	10.01	x	9.73	9.76	10.00	9.76	10.01	
7	Hamida Al-Habsi	Oman	9.37	8.78	8.27	7.83	8.41	8.37	9.37	

=== Discus throw ===
19 December

Rank	Athlete	Nationality	#1	#2	#3	#4	#5	#6	Result	Notes
1st place, gold medalist(s)	Elham Wahba	Egypt	45.79	46.88	x	x	36.83	x	46.88	
2nd place, silver medalist(s)	Sarah Hasseib Dardiri	Egypt	46.75	45.91	x	39.83	x	x	46.75	SB
3rd place, bronze medalist(s)	Basma Mohamed Abdoh	Bahrain	31.05	29.86	28.49	x	23.30	x	31.05	
4	Hamida Al-Habsi	Oman	27.24	27.26	24.83	21.48	23.43	22.73	27.26	
	Hanane Daoudi	Morocco	x	–	–	–	–	–	DNF	

=== Hammer throw ===
15 December

Rank	Athlete	Nationality	#1	#2	#3	#4	#5	#6	Result	Notes
1st place, gold medalist(s)	Sarah Bensaad	Tunisia	50.16	x	58.25	55.47	60.49	60.13	60.49	
2nd place, silver medalist(s)	Nehal Hamed	Egypt	x	56.25	58.64	57.09	56.22	57.58	58.64	
3rd place, bronze medalist(s)	Rana Ibrahim	Egypt	x	x	56.08	x	58.27	58.47	58.47	
4	Zouina Bouzebra	Algeria	54.42	57.33	55.36	57.22	56.54	57.24	57.33	PB
5	Fatine Oubourogaa	Morocco	x	56.88	53.28	55.14	52.37	x	56.88	SB

=== Javelin throw ===
19 December

Rank	Athlete	Nationality	#1	#2	#3	#4	#5	#6	Result	Notes
1st place, gold medalist(s)	Ahmed Reda	Egypt	44.78	45.52	42.44	45.28	42.54	45.93	45.93	SB
2nd place, silver medalist(s)	Sihem Marrakchi	Tunisia	41.95	43.63	40.38	43.75	42.98	39.35	43.75	
3rd place, bronze medalist(s)	Hanaa Hassan	Egypt	43.72	42.53	40.96	x	–	–	43.72	
4	Hanane Daoudi	Morocco	35.06	31.50	36.73	40.09	37.57	x	40.09	
5	Nada Chroudi	Tunisia	38.60	38.00	x	x	x	34.33	38.60	
6	Tahreer Al-Jouhar	Kuwait	28.48	26.56	x	x	x	x	28.48	SB

=== Heptathlon ===
December 15–16

The highest mark recorded in each event is highlighted in yellow

Rank	Athlete	Nationality	100m H	HJ	SP	200m	LJ	JT	800m	Points	Notes
1st place, gold medalist(s)	Nada Chroudi	Tunisia	15.25	1.51	12.15	26.14	5.67	37.72	2:27.71	4993	
2nd place, silver medalist(s)	Wedian Hussain	Egypt	14.86	1.63	9.68	26.18	5.40	28.48	2:24.77	4800	
3rd place, bronze medalist(s)	Radwa Fadl	Egypt	15.50	1.63	9.56	26.68	5.32	27.83	2:25.83	4618	
4	Katia Amokrane	Algeria	14.98	1.51	10.38	26.24	4.56	27.11	2:17.49	4529	PB
5	Christel El Saneh	Lebanon	17.97	1.39	8.38	27.40	5.02	31.96	2:43.61	3708	PB
6	Fatemeh Mazaher Sassanipoor	Qatar	17.68	1.24	8.51	29.09	4.58	25.42	3:08.11	2983	
