= Athletics at the 2014 Asian Games – Men's 800 metres =

Men's 800 metres at the 2014 Asian Games
- Venue: Incheon Asiad Main Stadium
- Dates: 30 September – 1 October 2014
- Competitors: 23 from 17 nations

Medalists
gold medal	Adnan Taess	Iraq
silver medal	Teng Haining	China
bronze medal	Jamal Hairane	Qatar

The men's 800 metres event at the 2014 Asian Games was held at the Incheon Asiad Main Stadium, Incheon, South Korea on 30 September – 1 October.

== Schedule ==
All times are Korea Standard Time (UTC+09:00)

Date	Time	Event
Tuesday, 30 September 2014	20:40	Round 1
Wednesday, 1 October 2014	19:20	Final

== Records ==
Prior to this competition, the existing world, Asian and Games records were as follows.

World Record	David Rudisha (KEN)	1:40.91	London, United Kingdom	9 August 2012
Asian Record	Yusuf Saad Kamel (BRN)	1:42.79	Monaco	29 July 2008
Games Record	Sajjad Moradi (IRI)	1:45.45	Guangzhou, China	25 November 2010

== Results ==
Legend

- DNF — Did not finish
- DNS — Did not start
- DSQ — Disqualified

=== Round 1 ===
- Qualification: First 2 in each heat (Q) and the next 2 fastest (q) advance to the final.

==== Heat 1 ====
Rank	Athlete	Time	Notes
1	Abdulaziz Ladan (KSA)	1:48.85	Q
2	Jamal Hairane (QAT)	1:48.91	Q
3	Adnan Taess (IRQ)	1:49.03	q
4	Dương Văn Thái (VIE)	1:50.66	
5	Kim Jun-young (KOR)	1:51.81	
6	Gal-Erdeniin Odkhüü (MGL)	1:53.69	
7	Ahmed Hassan (MDV)	1:56.46	
—	Sajjad Moradi (IRI)	DNS	

==== Heat 2 ====
Rank	Athlete	Time	Notes
1	Musaeb Abdulrahman Balla (QAT)	1:49.50	Q
2	Yusuf Saad Kamel (BRN)	1:49.56	Q
3	Sajeesh Joseph (IND)	1:49.90	q
4	Choi Hyeon-gi (KOR)	1:50.15	
5	Farkhod Kuralov (TJK)	1:50.55	
6	Asyeikhany Akhyt (MGL)	1:55.49	
7	Nurgazy Asankulov (KGZ)	1:57.40	

==== Heat 3 ====
Rank	Athlete	Time	Notes
1	Abraham Rotich (BRN)	1:47.95	Q
2	Teng Haining (CHN)	1:48.82	Q
3	Mohammad Al-Azemi (KUW)	1:51.63	
4	Sho Kawamoto (JPN)	1:53.24	
5	Mukti Bahadur Khadka (NEP)	1:55.20	
6	Almazbek Kazibekov (KGZ)	1:55.90	
7	Shifaz Mohamed (MDV)	2:02.58	
—	Wesam Al-Massri (PLE)	DNS	

=== Final ===
Rank	Athlete	Time	Notes
1st place, gold medalist(s)	Adnan Taess (IRQ)	1:47.48	
2nd place, silver medalist(s)	Teng Haining (CHN)	1:47.81	
3rd place, bronze medalist(s)	Jamal Hairane (QAT)	1:48.25	
4	Sajeesh Joseph (IND)	1:49.59	
—	Yusuf Saad Kamel (BRN)	DNF	
—	Musaeb Abdulrahman Balla (QAT)	DSQ	
—	Abdulaziz Ladan (KSA)	DSQ	
—	Abraham Rotich (BRN)	DSQ	
