= 2009 Asian Athletics Championships – Men's 800 metres =

The men's 800 metres event at the 2009 Asian Athletics Championships was held at the Guangdong Olympic Stadium on November 12–13.

== Medalists ==
Gold	Silver	Bronze
Sajjad Moradi; Iran	Mohammad Al-Azemi; Kuwait	Adnan Al-Mntfage; Iraq

== Results ==
=== Heats ===
Rank	Heat	Name	Nationality	Time	Notes
1	3	Sajjad Moradi	Iran	1:51.31	Q
2	1	Amir Moradi	Iran	1:51.42	Q
3	3	Adnan Al-Mntfage	Iraq	1:51.44	Q
4	3	Takeshi Kuchino	Japan	1:51.69	q
5	2	Masato Yokota	Japan	1:51.88	Q
6	1	Mohammad Al-Azemi	Kuwait	1:51.93	Q
7	2	Shishpal Prakash Verma	India	1:52.12	Q
8	2	Abdulaziz Ladan Mohammed	Saudi Arabia	1:52.45	q
9	1	Satnam Singh	India	1:52.46	
10	3	Xia Xiudong	China	1:52.61	
11	1	Mohd Jironi Riduan	Malaysia	1:52.84	
12	2	Prabath Kumara Mendis	Sri Lanka	1:52.88	
13	1	Kim Jae-youl	South Korea	1:53.15	
14	3	Nguyen Dinh Cuong	Vietnam	1:54.08	
15	2	Abedalaziz Almerdek	Jordan	1:54.25	
16	2	Vadivellan Mahemdran	Malaysia	1:54.38	
17	3	Farkhod Kuralov	Tajikistan	1:54.79	
18	1	Li Xiangyu	China	1:58.30	
	3	Belal Mansoor Ali	Bahrain	DNS	

=== Final ===
Rank	Name	Nationality	Time	Notes
1st place, gold medalist(s)	Sajjad Moradi	Iran	1:48.58	
2nd place, silver medalist(s)	Mohammad Al-Azemi	Kuwait	1:48.93	
3rd place, bronze medalist(s)	Adnan Al-Mntfage	Iraq	1:49.00	SB
4	Shishpal Prakash Verma	India	1:49.01	
5	Masato Yokota	Japan	1:50.35	
6	Amir Moradi	Iran	1:50.57	
7	Takeshi Kuchino	Japan	1:52.81	
8	Abdulaziz Ladan Mohammed	Saudi Arabia	1:53.69	
