= Adnan Taess =

Iraqi middle-distance runner

Adnan Taess Akkar
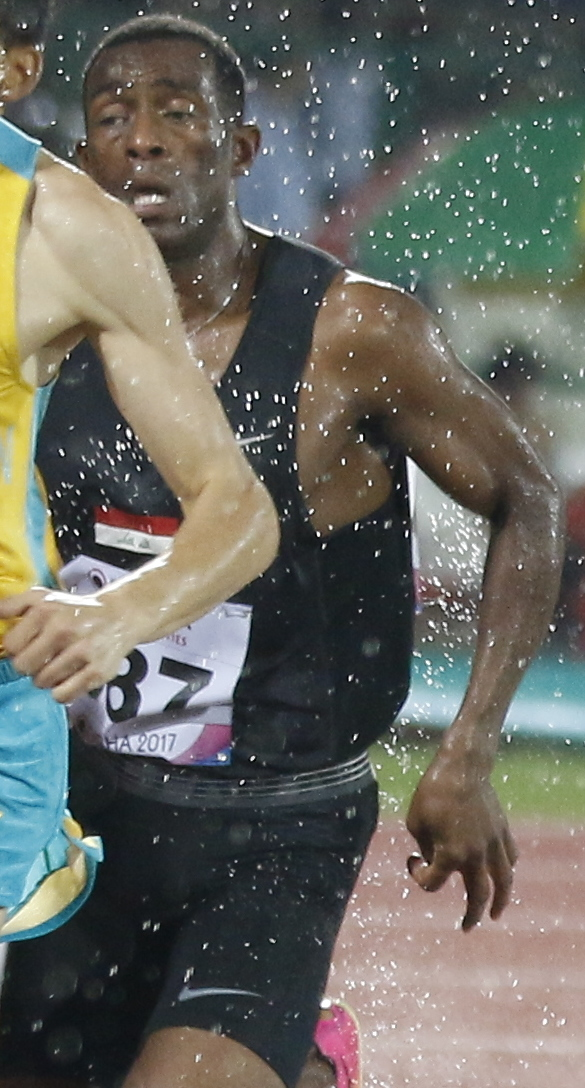
- Adnan Taess in 2017

Personal information
- Full name: Adnan Taess Akkar Al-Mntfage
- Nationality: (Iraq) Iraqi
- Born: 24 March 1980 (age 46) Wasit, Iraq
- Height: 1.65 m (5 ft 5 in)
- Weight: 78 kg (172 lb)

Sport
- Country: Iraq
- Sport: Athletics
- Event: 800 metres

Achievements and titles
- Olympicfinals: 2012 London (R1)
Medal record
Men's athletics
Representing Iraq
Asian Games
Gold medal – first place	2014 Incheon	800 m
Silver medal – second place	2010 Guangzhou	800 m
Bronze medal – third place	2014 Incheon	1500 m
Asian Championships
Silver medal – second place	2005 Incheon	1500 m
Bronze medal – third place	2009 Guangzhou	800 m
Asian Indoor Championships
Silver medal – second place	2012 Hangzhou	800 m
Pan Arab Games
Bronze medal – third place	2011 Doha	800 m

Adnan Taess Akkar Al-Mntfage (Arabic: عــدنان طعيس عكار المنتف;born 24 March 1980 in Wasit) is an Iraqi middle-distance runner. At the 2012 Summer Olympics, he competed in the Men's 800 metres.

== Competition record ==
Year	Competition	Venue	Position	Event	Notes
2004	Asian Indoor Championships	Tehran, Iran	5th	1500 m	3:59.46
2004	Asian Indoor Championships	Tehran, Iran	11th	3000 m	9:03.36
2005	Islamic Solidarity Games	Mecca, Saudi Arabia	5th	800 m	1:49.14
2005	Islamic Solidarity Games	Mecca, Saudi Arabia	7th	1500 m	3:51.50
2005	Islamic Solidarity Games	Mecca, Saudi Arabia	5th	4 × 400 m relay	3:12.34
2005	Asian Championships	Incheon, South Korea	6th	800 m	1:47.09
2005	Asian Championships	Incheon, South Korea	2nd	1500 m	3:44.57
2005	West Asian Games	Doha, Qatar	6th	1500 m	3:48.30
2006	Asian Indoor Championships	Pattaya, Thailand	9th	1500 m	4:02.36
2009	Asian Indoor Games	Hanoi, Vietnam	3rd	800 m	1:49.59 (iNR)
2009	Asian Indoor Games	Hanoi, Vietnam	–	1500 m	DNF
2009	Asian Championships	Guangzhou, China	3rd	800 m	1:49.00
2009	Asian Championships	Guangzhou, China	7th	1500 m	3:49.84
2010	West Asian Championships	Aleppo, Syria	3rd	800 m	1:46.26
2010	West Asian Championships	Aleppo, Syria	6th	1500 m	3:44.74
2010	Asian Games	Guangzhou, China	2nd	800 m	1:45.88 (NR)
2010	Asian Games	Guangzhou, China	10th	1500 m	3:50.83
2011	Pan Arab Games	Doha, Qatar	3rd	800 m	1:47.18
2011	Pan Arab Games	Doha, Qatar	–	1500 m	DNF
2012	Asian Indoor Championships	Hangzhou, China	2nd	800 m	1:49.42 (iNR)
2012	Olympic Games	London, United Kingdom	31st (h)	800 m	1:47.83
2012	West Asian Championships	Dubai, United Arab Emirates	1st	800 m	1:51.40
2012	West Asian Championships	Dubai, United Arab Emirates	3rd	4 × 400 m relay	3:13.79
2013	Arab Championships	Doha, Qatar	7th	800 m	1:50.30
2013	Arab Championships	Doha, Qatar	11th	1500 m	3:51.18
2013	Asian Championships	Pune, India	15th (h)	800 m	1:55.30
2013	Islamic Solidarity Games	Palembang, Indonesia	7th	1500 m	3:43.03
2014	Asian Games	Incheon, South Korea	1st	800 m	1:47.48
2014	Asian Games	Incheon, South Korea	3rd	1500 m	3:42.50
2015	World Championships	Beijing, China	43rd (h)	800 m	1:54.44
2016	Asian Indoor Championships	Doha, Qatar	–	1500 m	DNF
2017	Asian Championships	Bhubaneswar, India	4th	1500 m	3:49.03
2017	Asian Indoor and Martial Arts Games	Ashgabat, Turkmenistan	3rd	1500 m	3:50.98
2018	Asian Games	Jakarta, Indonesia	7th	1500 m	3:49.02
