= 2005 Asian Athletics Championships – Men's 1500 metres =

The men's 1500 metres event at the 2005 Asian Athletics Championships was held in Incheon, South Korea on September 2.

== Results ==
| Rank | Name | Nationality | Time | Notes |
|---|---|---|---|---|
| 1st place, gold medalist(s) | Abubaker Ali Kamal | Qatar | 3:44.24 | |
| 2nd place, silver medalist(s) | Adnan Taess | Iraq | 3:44.57 | PB |
| 3rd place, bronze medalist(s) | Nasser Shams Kareem | Qatar | 3:46.09 | |
| 4 | Yasunori Murakami | Japan | 3:46.80 | |
| 5 | Mikhail Kolganov | Kazakhstan | 3:47.45 | |
| 6 | Chaminda Wijekoon | Sri Lanka | 3:48.29 | |
| 7 | Ghamanda Ram | India | 3:49.62 | |
| 8 | Sunil Jayaweera | Sri Lanka | 3:50.05 | |
| 9 | Ajmal Amirov | Tajikistan | 3:51.15 | |
| 10 | Pritam Bind | India | 3:51.49 | |
| 11 | Chen Fu-Pin | Chinese Taipei | 3:51.50 | |
| 12 | Park Jung-Jin | South Korea | 3:51.67 | |
| 13 | Denis Bagrev | Kyrgyzstan | 3:51.69 | |
| 14 | John Lozada | Philippines | 3:52.21 | PB |
| 15 | Srisung Boonthung | Thailand | 3:52.80 | SB |
| 16 | Qais Al-Mahrooqi | Oman | 3:53.00 | NR |
| 17 | Nguyen Dinh Cuong | Vietnam | 3:53.40 | |
| 18 | Hariyono Saputro | Indonesia | 3:58.15 | |
| 19 | Mahendran Vadivellan | Malaysia | 4:00.68 | SB |
| 20 | Hem Bunting | Cambodia | 4:03.87 | PB |
| 21 | Saysana Bannavong | Laos | 4:08.03 | NJR |
| 22 | Jimmy Anak Ahar | Brunei | 4:17.89 | SB |
| | Ehsan Mohajer Shojaei | Iran | DNF | |
