= Benson Seurei =

Bahraini middle-distance runner

Benson Kiplagat Seurei
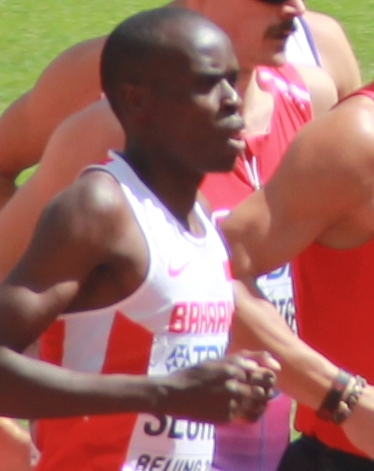
- Seurei in 2015

Personal information
- Born: 27 March 1984 (age 42)

Sport
- Country: Bahrain
- Sport: Track and field
- Event: 1500 metres
Medal record
Men's athletics
Representing Bahrain
Asian Indoor Championships
Silver medal – second place	2016 Doha	1500 m
- Updated on 29 August 2015

Benson Kiplagat Seurei (born 27 March 1984) is a Kenyan-born Bahraini middle-distance runner competing primarily in the 1500 metres. He represented his country in the 1500 metres at the 2015 World Championships in Beijing without advancing from the first round. In 2019, he competed in the men's marathon at the 2019 World Athletics Championships held in Doha, Qatar. He did not finish his race.

== Competition record ==
Year	Competition	Venue	Position	Event	Notes
Representing Bahrain
2013	Arab Championships	Doha, Qatar	2nd	1500 m	3:40.07
2014	Asian Games	Incheon, South Korea	4th	1500 m	3:44.20
2014	Continental Cup	Marrakech, Morocco	5th	1500 m	3:49.91^{1}
2015	World Championships	Beijing, China	36th (h)	1500 m	3:45.70
2015	Military World Games	Mungyeong, South Korea	2nd	1500 m	3:44.98
2016	Asian Indoor Championships	Doha, Qatar	2nd	1500 m	3:37.08
2016	Olympic Games	Rio de Janeiro, Brazil	13th (sf)	1500 m	3:40.53
2017	Islamic Solidarity Games	Baku, Azerbaijan	4th	1500 m	3:39.99
2017	World Championships	London, United Kingdom	19th (sf)	1500 m	3:40.96
2018	West Asian Championships	Amman, Jordan	1st	10,000 m	30:34.79
2019	World Championships	Doha, Qatar	–	Marathon	DNF

^{1}Representing Asia-Pacific

== Personal bests ==
Outdoor

- 800 metres – 1:45.67 (Bottrop 2012)
- 1000 metres – 2:16.39 (Linz 2012)
- 1500 metres – 3:31.61 (Monaco 2012)
- One mile – 3:56.78 (Heidelberg 2013)
- 3000 metres – 7:40.56 (Zagreb 2013)
- 3000 metres steeplechase – 8:37.3 (Nairobi 2006)

Indoor

- 800 metres – 1:48.37 (Ludwigshafen 2012)
- 1000 metres – 2:20.14 (Prague 2009)
- 1500 metres – 3:37.08 (Doha 2016)
- 3000 metres – 7:48.96 (Linz 2012)
