= Ehsan Mohajer Shojaei =

Iranian track and field athlete

Personal information
- Nationality: Iranian
- Born: March 21, 1983 (age 43) Borujerd, Iran
- Height: 178 cm (5 ft 10 in)
- Weight: 72 kg (159 lb)

Sport
- Sport: Track
- Events: 400 metres, 800 metres

Achievements and titles
- Personal bests: 400 metres: 46.51; 800 metres: 1:45.90
Medal record
Representing Iran
Men's athletics
Asian Games
Bronze medal – third place	2006 Doha	800 m
Asian Championships
Bronze medal – third place	2011 Kobe	4×400 m relay
Asian Indoor Games
Silver medal – second place	2007 Macau	800 m
Asian Indoor Championships
Silver medal – second place	2008 Doha	800 m
Bronze medal – third place	2004 Tehran	1500 m
Universiade
Gold medal – first place	2007 Bangkok	800 m
- Updated on former partner: m. Toosi

Ehsan Mohajer Shojaei (Persian: احسان مهاجر شجاعی, born 21 March 1983) is an Iranian middle distance track athlete who specialized in the 800 metres. Mohajer Shojaei was a bronze medalist in the 2006 Asian Games and 2011 Asian Athletics Championships, a competitor at the 2008 Summer Olympics, and a gold medalist at the 2007 Summer Universiade (his first gold medal in an international competition). He was born only one day off of the birth date of fellow countryman Sajjad Moradi, with whom Shojaei ran numerous 800 metres races in international competition.

== Running career ==
Mohajer Shojaei made his debut on the world stage at the age of 19, when he ran a time of 1:50.08 (min:sec) in the 800 metres race at the 2002 Asian Junior Athletics Championships in Thailand.

He won his first gold medal at the 2007 Summer Universiade, running the 800 in 1:46.04, which at the time was his personal best. From this point he gained form for next year's Olympic Games. However, Shojaei did not qualify past the first round in the 800-m race at the 2008 Summer Olympics, running a slightly slower (in comparison to his blistering Universiade victory) 1:49.25.

== Competition record ==
Year	Competition	Venue	Position	Event	Notes
2002	Asian Junior Championships	Bangkok, Thailand	5th	800 m	1:50.08
2003	World Championships	Paris, France	21st (sf)	800 m	1:47.71
2003	Asian Championships	Manila, Philippines	6th (h)	800 m	1:48.97
2004	Asian Indoor Championships	Tehran, Iran	5th	800 m	1:49.76
2004	Asian Indoor Championships	Tehran, Iran	3rd	1500 m	3:56.06
2005	Universiade	İzmir, Turkey	6th	800 m	1:47.96
2005	Universiade	İzmir, Turkey	–	4 × 400 m relay	DNF
2005	Asian Championships	Incheon, South Korea	–	800 m	DNF
2005	Asian Championships	Incheon, South Korea	–	1500 m	DNF
2005	Asian Championships	Incheon, South Korea	4th	4 × 400 m relay	3:08.75
2006	Asian Games	Doha, Qatar	3rd	800 m	1:47.43
2007	Asian Championships	Amman, Jordan	7th	800 m	1:57.81
2007	Universiade	Bangkok, Thailand	1st	800 m	1:46.04
2007	Asian Indoor Games	Macau	2nd	800 m	1:50.22
2008	Asian Indoor Championships	Doha, Qatar	2nd	800 m	1:48.68
2008	World Indoor Championships	Valencia, Spain	15th (sf)	800 m	1:49.32
2008	Olympic Games	Beijing, China	50th (h)	800 m	1:49.25
2009	Universiade	Belgrade, Serbia	9th (h)	800 m	1:50.65
2011	Asian Championships	Kobe, Japan	6th	800 m	1:49.44
2011	Asian Championships	Kobe, Japan	3rd	4 × 400 m relay	3:08.58
