= 2007 Asian Athletics Championships – Men's 800 metres =

The men's 800 metres event at the 2007 Asian Athletics Championships was held in Amman, Jordan on July 27–28.

== Medalists ==
Gold	Silver	Bronze
Mohammed Obeid Al-Salhi; Saudi Arabia	Sajjad Moradi; Iran	Abubaker Ali Kamal; Qatar

== Results ==
=== Heats ===
Rank	Heat	Name	Nationality	Time	Notes
1	1	Sajjad Moradi	Iran	1:48.47	Q
2	1	Abubaker Ali Kamal	Qatar	1:48.80	Q
3	1	Ali Al-Deraan	Saudi Arabia	1:48.84	Q
4	1	Suresh Siddapurage	Sri Lanka	1:49.95	q
5	1	Francis Sagayaraj	India	1:50.17	q
6	2	Mohammed Obeid Al-Salhi	Saudi Arabia	1:50.96	Q
7	2	Ehsan Mohajer Shojaei	Iran	1:51.53	Q
8	2	Rajeev Ramesan	India	1:51.64	Q
9	2	Masato Yokota	Japan	1:52.23	
10	2	Musaab Bala	Qatar	1:57.11	
11	1	Pratap Chand	Nepal	2:02.21	
12	2	Rajamanickam Subaish	Singapore	2:03.11	
13	1	Shareg Hamkar	Afghanistan	2:10.29	
	1	Vadivellan Mahendran	Malaysia	DNS	
	2	Mohammed Al-Sabahi	Yemen	DNS	

=== Final ===
Rank	Name	Nationality	Time	Notes
1st place, gold medalist(s)	Mohammed Obeid Al-Salhi	Saudi Arabia	1:51.73	
2nd place, silver medalist(s)	Sajjad Moradi	Iran	1:52.22	
3rd place, bronze medalist(s)	Abubaker Ali Kamal	Qatar	1:52.88	
4	Ali Al-Deraan	Saudi Arabia	1:53.50	
5	Rajeev Ramesan	India	1:55.16	
6	Suresh Siddapurage	Sri Lanka	1:56.27	
7	Ehsan Mohajer Shojaei	Iran	1:57.81	
8	Francis Sagayaraj	India	2:02.43	
