= Farkhod Kuralov =

Tajikistani middle-distance runner

Personal information
- Nationality: Tajikistani
- Born: 18 October 1993 (age 32)

Sport
- Sport: Track and field
- Event: 800m

Farkhod Kuralov (born 18 October 1993) is a Tajikistani middle-distance runner. He competed in the 800 metres event at the 2014 IAAF World Indoor Championships. In 2016, he tested positive for Stanozolol and was banned from competition for four years between 13 June 2016 and 28 June 2020.

== Competition record ==
| Year | Competition | Venue | Position | Event | Notes |
Representing Tajikistan
| 2009 | Asian Championships | Guangzhou, China | 18th (h) | 400 m | 49.42 |
| 2009 | Asian Championships | Guangzhou, China | 17th (h) | 800 m | 1:54.79 |
| 2010 | Asian Indoor Championships | Tehran, Iran | 8th (h) | 800 m | 1:57.13 |
| 2010 | Asian Junior Championships | Hanoi, Vietnam | 4th | 800 m | 1:49.41 |
| 2010 | World Junior Championships | Moncton, Canada | 28th (h) | 800 m | 1:51.39 |
| 2010 | Asian Games | Guangzhou, China | – | 800 m | DQ |
| 2011 | Asian Championships | Kobe, Japan | 7th | 800 m | 1:51.13 |
| 2011 | Universiade | Shenzhen, China | 35th (h) | 800 m | 1:52.82 |
| 2012 | World Indoor Championships | Istanbul, Turkey | 18th (h) | 800 m | 1:52.61 |
| 2013 | Universiade | Kazan, Russia | 20th (sf) | 800 m | 1:53.02 |
| 2014 | World Indoor Championships | Sopot, Poland | 16th (h) | 800 m | 1:52.36 |
| 2014 | Asian Games | Incheon, South Korea | 10th (h) | 800 m | 1:50.55 |
| 2014 | Asian Games | Incheon, South Korea | 13th (h) | 1500 m | 3:55.56 |
| 2015 | Asian Championships | Wuhan, China | 6th | 800 m | 1:51.60 |
| 2016 | Asian Indoor Championships | Doha, Qatar | 5th | 800 m | 1:54.07 |
