= Abdulaziz Ladan =

Saudi Arabian middle-distance runner

Abdulaziz Ladan Mohammed (Arabic: عبدالعزيز لادان محمد; born 7 January 1991 in Jeddah) is a Saudi Arabian middle-distance runner. At the 2012 Summer Olympics, he competed in the Men's 800 metres.

== Competition record ==
Year	Competition	Venue	Position	Event	Notes
Representing Saudi Arabia
2009	Asian Indoor Games	Hanoi, Vietnam	7th (h)	800 m	1:58.07
2009	Asian Championships	Guangzhou, China	8th	800 m	1:53.69
2010	Asian Junior Championships	Hanoi, Vietnam	3rd	800 m	1:48.97
2010	World Junior Championships	Moncton, Canada	17th (sf)	800 m	1:50.78
2010	West Asian Championships	Aleppo, Syria	7th	800 m	1:49.52
2010	Asian Games	Guangzhou, China	13th (h)	800 m	1:50.39
2011	Pan Arab Games	Doha, Qatar	2nd (h)	800 m	1:48.91
2011	Pan Arab Games	Doha, Qatar	8th (h)	1500 m	3:49.51
2012	Olympic Games	London, United Kingdom	23rd (sf)	800 m	1:48.98
2013	Asian Championships	Pune, India	2nd	800 m	1:47.01
2013	World Championships	Moscow, Russia	8th	800 m	1:46.57
2014	Asian Games	Incheon, South Korea	3rd (h)	800 m	1:48.85
