= Athletics at the 2014 Asian Games – Men's 1500 metres =

Men's 1500 metres at the 2014 Asian Games
- Venue: Incheon Asiad Main Stadium
- Dates: 28–29 September 2014
- Competitors: 20 from 13 nations

Medalists
gold medal	Mohamad Al-Garni	Qatar
silver medal	Rashid Ramzi	Bahrain
bronze medal	Adnan Taess	Iraq

The men's 1500 metres event at the 2014 Asian Games was held at the Incheon Asiad Main Stadium, Incheon, South Korea on 28–29 September.

== Schedule ==
All times are Korea Standard Time (UTC+09:00)

Date	Time	Event
Sunday, 28 September 2014	10:30	Round 1
Monday, 29 September 2014	19:15	Final

== Records ==
Prior to this competition, the existing world, Asian and Games records were as follows.

World Record	Hicham El-Guerrouj (MAR)	3:26.00	Rome, Italy	14 July 1998
Asian Record	Rashid Ramzi (BRN)	3:29.14	Rome, Italy	14 July 2006
Games Record	Mohammed Shaween (KSA)	3:36.49	Guangzhou, China	23 November 2010

== Results ==
Legend

- DNS — Did not start

=== Round 1 ===
- Qualification: First 4 in each heat (Q) and the next 4 fastest (q) advance to the final.

==== Heat 1 ====
Rank	Athlete	Time	Notes
1	Benson Seurei (BRN)	3:44.64	Q
2	Adnan Taess (IRQ)	3:45.04	Q
3	Hamza Driouch (QAT)	3:45.16	Q
4	Wesam Al-Massri (PLE)	3:45.32	Q
5	Kim Yong-gu (KOR)	3:50.05	q
6	Gal-Erdeniin Odkhüü (MGL)	3:55.41	q
7	Almazbek Kazibekov (KGZ)	4:01.20	
8	Hari Kumar Rimal (NEP)	4:05.15	
9	Ahmed Hassan (MDV)	4:09.88	
—	Nguyễn Văn Lai (VIE)	DNS	

==== Heat 2 ====
Rank	Athlete	Time	Notes
1	Rashid Ramzi (BRN)	3:51.17	Q
2	Mohamad Al-Garni (QAT)	3:52.92	Q
3	Abdullah Al-Salhi (KSA)	3:53.08	Q
4	Omar Al-Rasheedi (KUW)	3:54.30	Q
5	Dương Văn Thái (VIE)	3:54.61	q
6	Adilet Kyshtakbekov (KGZ)	3:55.40	q
7	Farkhod Kuralov (TJK)	3:55.56	
8	Sin Sang-min (KOR)	3:57.19	
9	Narandulamyn Mönkhbayar (MGL)	3:58.70	
10	Shifaz Mohamed (MDV)	4:14.83	

=== Final ===
Rank	Athlete	Time	Notes
1st place, gold medalist(s)	Mohamad Al-Garni (QAT)	3:40.23	
2nd place, silver medalist(s)	Rashid Ramzi (BRN)	3:40.95	
3rd place, bronze medalist(s)	Adnan Taess (IRQ)	3:42.50	
4	Benson Seurei (BRN)	3:44.20	
5	Abdullah Al-Salhi (KSA)	3:48.50	
6	Wesam Al-Massri (PLE)	3:48.97	
7	Kim Yong-gu (KOR)	3:50.33	
8	Dương Văn Thái (VIE)	3:50.50	
9	Hamza Driouch (QAT)	3:52.16	
10	Adilet Kyshtakbekov (KGZ)	3:54.30	
11	Gal-Erdeniin Odkhüü (MGL)	3:57.96	
—	Omar Al-Rasheedi (KUW)	DNS	
