= Ali Al-Deraan =

Saudi Arabian middle-distance runner

Personal information
- Born: 17 April 1990 (age 36)
- Height: 1.77 m (5 ft 10 in)
- Weight: 66 kg (146 lb)

Sport
- Sport: Track and field
- Event: 800 metres
Medal record
Men's athletics
Representing Saudi Arabia
Asian Indoor Championships
Gold medal – first place	2008 Doha	4×400 m

Ali Saad Al-Deraan (Arabic: علي الدرعان; born 17 April 1990) is a Saudi athlete competing primarily over the 800 metres distance. He represented his country at the 2015 World Championships, reaching the semifinals.

His personal best in the event is 1:45.57 set in Lignano Sabbiadoro in 2015.

== Competition record ==
Year	Competition	Venue	Position	Event	Notes
Representing Saudi Arabia
2006	Asian Junior Championships	Macau, China	2nd	800 m	1:53.03
2006	World Junior Championships	Beijing, China	33rd (h)	800 m	1:51.69
2006	World Junior Championships	Beijing, China	–	4x400 m relay	DQ
2006	Asian Games	Doha, Qatar	4th	800 m	1:48.48
2007	World Youth Championships	Ostrava, Czech Republic	2nd	800 m	1:50.10
2007	World Youth Championships	Ostrava, Czech Republic	5th (h)	Medley relay	1:53.83
2007	Asian Championships	Amman, Jordan	4th	800 m	1:53.50
2007	Asian Indoor Games	Macau, China	3rd (h)	800 m	1:52.74
2007	Asian Indoor Games	Macau, China	1st	4x400 m relay	3:11.29
2007	Pan Arab Games	Cairo, Egypt	6th	800 m	1:50.23
2008	World Junior Championships	Bydgoszcz, Poland	12th (sf)	800 m	1:49.45
2008	World Junior Championships	Bydgoszcz, Poland	16th (h)	4x400 m relay	3:11.37
2008	Asian Indoor Championships	Doha, Qatar	1st	4x400 m relay	3:14.25
2014	IAAF World Relays	Nassau, Bahamas	20th (h)	4x400 m relay	3:06.37
2015	IAAF World Relays	Nassau, Bahamas	13th (h)	4x400 m relay	3:06.15
2015	Arab Championships	Isa Town, Bahrain	2nd	800 m	1:47.03
2015	World Championships	Beijing, China	21st (sf)	800 m	1:48.71
2015	Military World Games	Mungyeong, South Korea	1st	800 m	1:45.50

== Personal bests ==
Outdoors

- 400 metres – 48.73 (Jamsankoski 2008)
- 800 metres – 1:45.57 (Lignano Sabbiadoro 2015)

Indoors

- 800 metres – 1:52.74 (Macau 2007) NR
