= Masato Yokota =

Japanese middle-distance runner

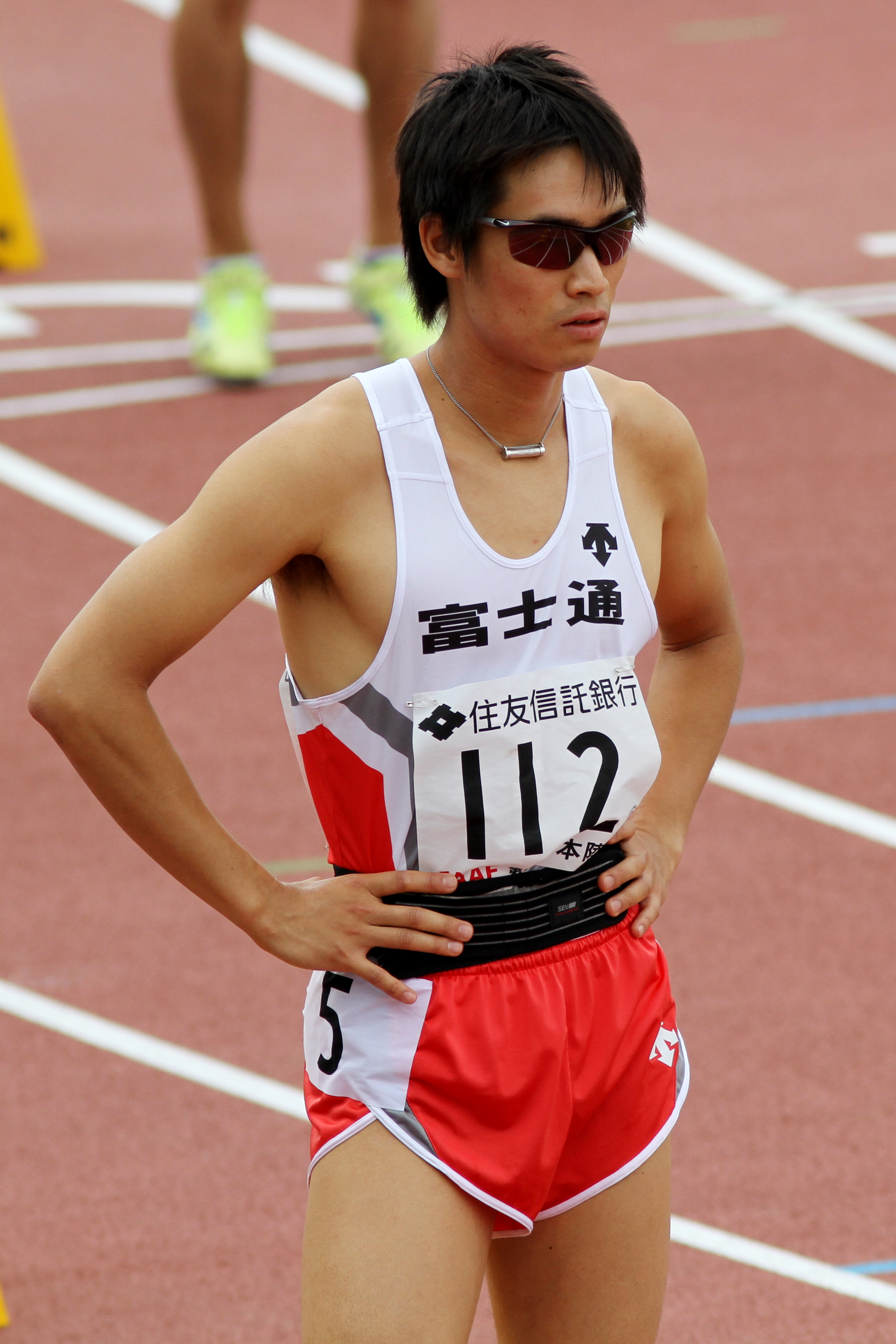

Personal information
- Born: 19 November 1987 (age 38) Tokyo, Japan
- Education: Keio University
- Height: 1.77 m (5 ft 10 in)
- Weight: 62 kg (137 lb)

Sport
- Country: Japan
- Event: 800 metres
- Club: Fujitsu
- Coached by: Joe Douglas

Achievements and titles
- Personal best: 800 m: 1:46.16 (2009)
Medal record
Men's athletics
Representing Japan
Asian Indoor Championships
Bronze medal – third place	2008 Doha	800 m
- Updated on 21 February 2013

Masato Yokota (横田 真人, Yokota Masato; born 19 November 1987 in Tokyo) is a Japanese track and field athlete, specializing in the 800 metres. He was Japanese record holder in the 800 metres from 18 October 2009, until 11 May 2014.

He graduated the Keio University. He trains at Fujitsu Track & Field team. As the winner of the 2012 Japanese Olympic Trials, Masato represented his home country in the 2012 Summer Olympics. He has also competed in the 2007 and 2011 IAAF World Championships in Athletics. As of 2012, he has won six Japan Championships (2006 - 2007, 2009 - 2012).

Masato trains in the United States as a member of the Santa Monica Track Club.

After his competition career, Masato currently is the head coach of the NIKE TOKYO TRACK CLUB in Tokyo, Japan.

== Competition record ==
Year	Competition	Venue	Position	Event	Notes
Representing Japan
2006	Asian Junior Championships	Macau	1st	800 m	1:51.34
2006	World Junior Championships	Beijing, China	11th (sf)	800m	1:48.98
2006	World Junior Championships	Beijing, China	6th (h)	4 × 400 m relay	3:07.27
2007	Asian Championships	Amman, Jordan	9th (h)	800 m	1:52.23
2007	World Championships	Osaka, Japan	38th (h)	800 m	1:47.16
2008	Asian Indoor Championships	Doha, Qatar	3rd	800 m	1:49.30
2009	Universiade	Belgrade, Serbia	4th	800 m	1:48.08
2009	Asian Championships	Guangzhou, China	5th	800 m	1:50.35
2010	Asian Indoor Championships	Tehran, Iran	3rd	800 m	1:54.71
2010	Asian Games	Guangzhou, China	4th	800 m	1:46.48
2011	Asian Championships	Kobe, Japan	4th	800 m	1:47.05
2011	World Championships	Daegu, South Korea	26th (h)	800 m	1:47.60
2012	Olympic Games	London, United Kingdom	37th (h)	800 m	1:48.48
2013	Asian Championships	Pune, India	7th	800 m	1:51.13
