= Musaeb Abdulrahman Balla =

Sudanese-born Qatari middle-distance runner

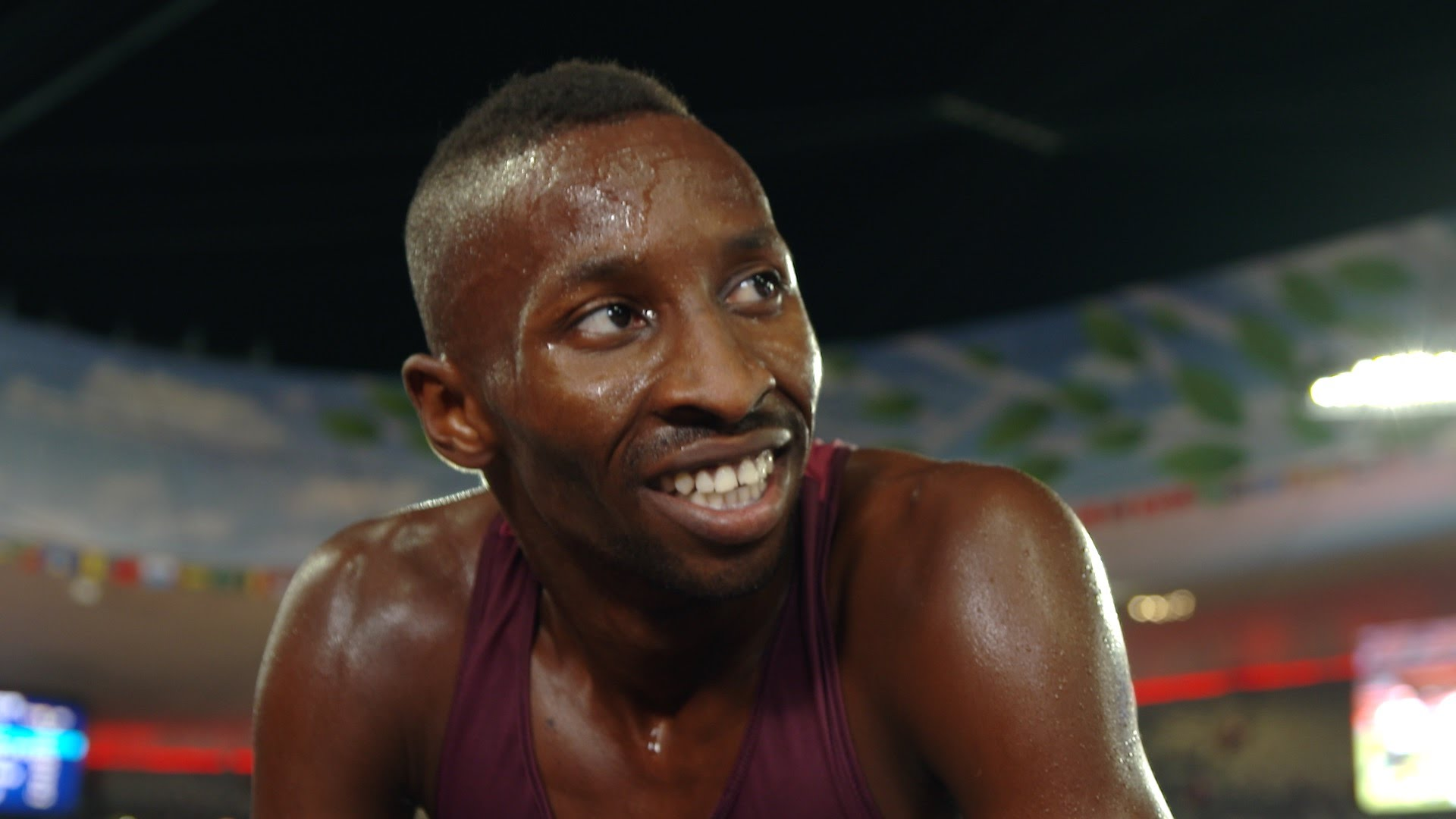
- Balla in 2015

Personal information
- Born: 19 March 1989 (age 37) Khartoum, Sudan
- Height: 1.76 m (5 ft 9 in)
- Weight: 60 kg (132 lb)

Sport
- Sport: Athletics
- Event: 800 m
- Coached by: Jama Aden
Medal record
Men's athletics
Representing Qatar
Asian Indoor Championships
Gold medal – first place	2014 Hangzhou	800 m
Gold medal – first place	2016 Doha	800 m
Gold medal – first place	2016 Doha	4×400 m
Bronze medal – third place	2008 Doha	4×400 m
Bronze medal – third place	2023 Astana	800 m
Pan Arab Games
Gold medal – first place	2011 Doha	800 m

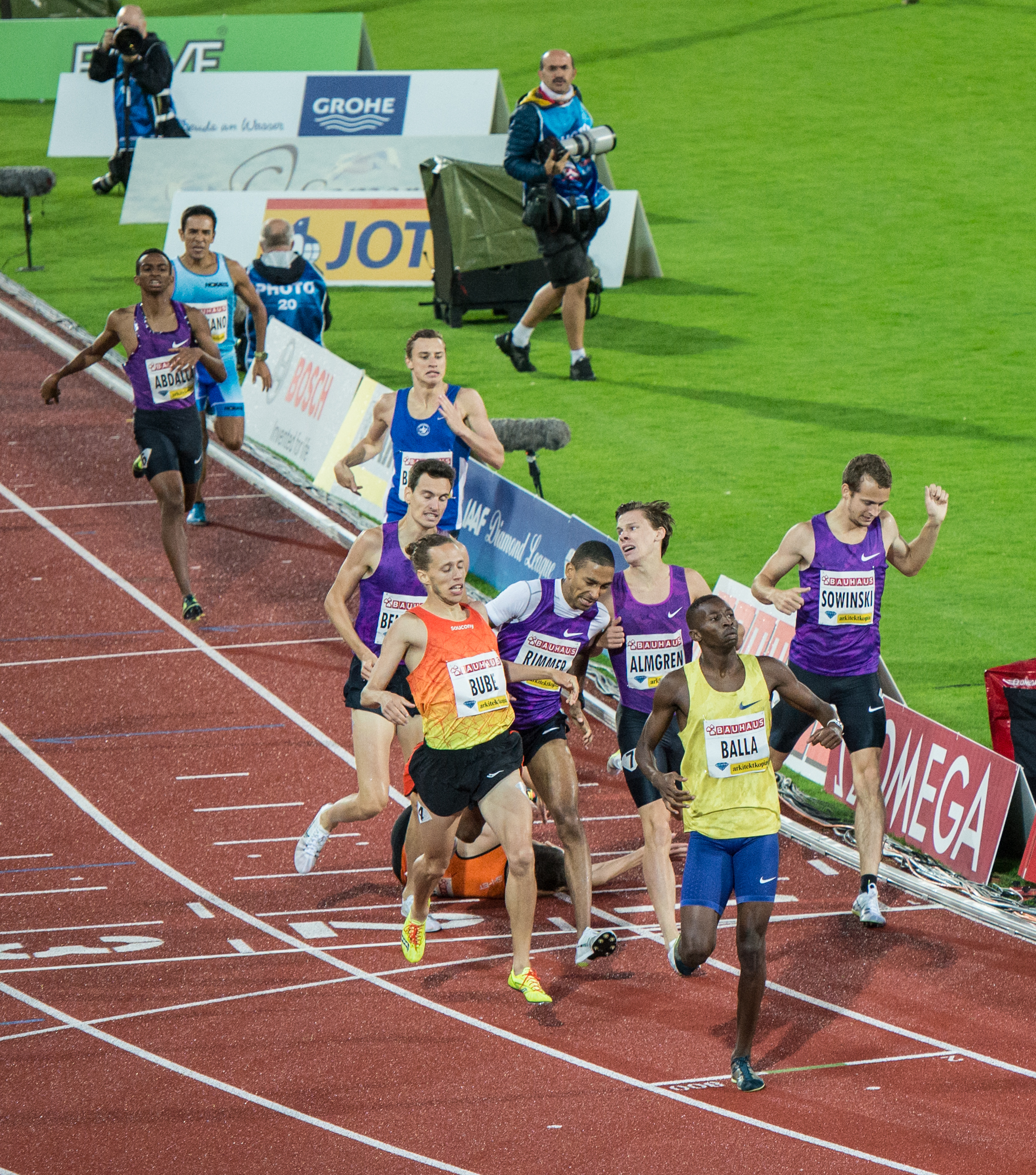
Musaeb Abdulrahman Balla wins at Diamond League in Stockholm 2015.

Musaeb Abdulrahman Balla (Arabic: عبدالرحمن بله; born 19 March 1989) is a Sudanese-born Qatari middle-distance runner competing primarily in the 800 metres. He represented Qatar at the 2012 Summer Olympics as well as two outdoor and three indoor World Championships.

== Competition record ==
Year	Competition	Venue	Position	Event	Notes
Representing Qatar
2007	Asian Championships	Amman, Jordan	10th (h)	800 m	1:57.11
2008	Asian Indoor Championships	Doha, Qatar	4th (sf)	800 m	1:51.93
2008	Asian Indoor Championships	Doha, Qatar	3rd	4 × 400 m relay	3:17.93
2008	Asian Junior Championships	Jakarta, Indonesia	1st	800 m	1:52.45
2010	Asian Indoor Championships	Tehran, Iran	2nd	800 m	1:54.25
2010	Asian Games	Guangzhou, China	3rd	800 m	1:46.19
2011	Pan Arab Games	Doha, Qatar	1st	800 m	1:45.92
2012	World Indoor Championships	Istanbul, Turkey	15th (sf)	800 m	1:49.51
2012	Olympic Games	London, United Kingdom	22nd (sf)	800 m	1:47.52
2013	Arab Championships	Doha, Qatar	1st	800 m	1:45.90
2013	Arab Championships	Doha, Qatar	2nd	4 × 400 m relay	3:09.55
2013	Asian Championships	Pune, India	4th	400 m	46.45
2013	Asian Championships	Pune, India	1st	800 m	1:46.92
2013	World Championships	Moscow, Russia	11th (sf)	800 m	1:45.43
2013	Jeux de la Francophonie	Nice, France	1st	800 m	1:46.57
2013	Islamic Solidarity Games	Palembang, Indonesia	2nd	800 m	1:44.19
2014	Asian Indoor Championships	Hangzhou, China	1st	800 m	1:50.27
2014	World Indoor Championships	Sopot, Poland	–	800 m	DQ
2014	Continental Cup	Marrakesh, Morocco	7th	800 m	1:48.50^{1}
2014	Asian Games	Incheon, South Korea	6th (h)	800 m	1:49.50^{2}
2015	Arab Championships	Isa Town, Bahrain	1st	800 m	1:46.74
2015	Asian Championships	Wuhan, China	1st	800 m	1:49.40
2015	Asian Championships	Wuhan, China	1st	4 × 400 m relay	3:02.50
2015	World Championships	Beijing, China	6th	800 m	1:47.01
2016	Asian Indoor Championships	Doha, Qatar	1st	800 m	1:46.92
2016	Asian Indoor Championships	Doha, Qatar	1st	4 × 400 m relay	3:08.20
2016	World Indoor Championships	Portland, United States	5th	800 m	1:48.31
2022	GCC Games	Kuwait City, Kuwait	2nd	800 m	1:49.83
2023	Asian Indoor Championships	Astana, Kazakhstan	3rd	800 m	1:49.68

^{1}Representing Asia

^{2}Disqualified in the final

== Personal bests ==
Outdoor

- 600 metres – 1:15.99 (Stockholm 2013)
- 800 metres – 1:43.82 (Barcelona 2015)

Indoor

- 600 metres – 1:15.83 (Moscow 2014)
- 800 metres – 1:45.48 (Stockholm 2015)
- 1000 metres – 2:21.71 (Birmingham 2011)
