= Track and field at the 2015 Military World Games – Men's 800 metres =

The men's 800 metres event at the 2015 Military World Games was held on 4 and 5 and 6 October at the KAFAC Sports Complex.

== Records ==
Prior to this competition, the existing world and CISM record were as follows:

World Record	David Rudisha (KEN)	1:40.91	London, Great Britain	9 August 2012
CISM World Record	Philip Kibitok (KEN)	1:45.63	Rome, Italy	September 1995

== Schedule ==
Date	Time	Round
4 October 2015	15:50	Round 1
5 October 2015	16:40	Semifinals
6 October 2015	15:50	Final

== Medalists ==
Gold	Silver	Bronze
Ali Alderaan; Saudi Arabia	Jackson Kivuva; Kenya	Marcin Lewandowski; Poland

== Results ==
=== Round 1 ===
Qualification: First 3 in each heat (Q) and next 4 fastest (q) qualified for the semifinals.

Rank	Heat	Name	Nationality	Time	Notes
1	1	Abubaker Haydar Abdalla	Qatar	1:48.81	Q
2	3	Ali Alderaan	Saudi Arabia	1:48.98	Q
3	3	Jonathan Kiprotich Kitilit	Kenya	1:50.03	Q
4	1	Linus Kiplagat	Bahrain	1:50.20	Q
5	3	Amine Belferar	Algeria	1:50.42	Q
6	1	Marcin Lewandowski	Poland	1:52.30	Q
7	3	Sajad Bahmani	Iran	1:52.74	q
8	3	Bong Soo Kim	South Korea	1:53.06	q
9	2	Jackson Kivuva	Kenya	1:53.73	Q
10	2	Jonathan Kipkosgei	Bahrain	1:53.79	Q
11	2	Roland Christen	Switzerland	1:53.98	Q
12	2	Diego Villanueva	Venezuela	1:54.30	q
13	4	Jamal Hairane	Qatar	1:54.34	Q
14	1	Jinson Johnson	India	1:54.74	q
15	4	Remi Montero	France	1:54.99	Q
16	4	Janis Razgalis	Latvia	1:55.15	Q
17	2	Sung Yun Back	South Korea	1:55.16	
18	1	Vincent Duguay	Canada	1:55.62	
19	4	Ammar Znaidia	Tunisia	1:55.72	
20	3	Joseph Boland	Canada	1:55.97	
21	2	Florian Seres	Hungary	1:56.32	
22	4	Kendis Bullard	Trinidad and Tobago	1:56.83	
23	4	Davoodi Akbar	Iran	1:57.92	
24	1	Stanimir Hristov Bochev	Bulgaria	2:06.36	
	1	Emmanuel Chimdzeka	Malawi	DNS	
	2	Pethias Barclays Gondwe Mdoka	Malawi	DNS	

=== Semifinals ===
Qualification: First 3 in each heat (Q) and next 2 fastest (q) qualified for the final.

Rank	Heat	Name	Nationality	Time	Notes
1	2	Ali Alderaan	Saudi Arabia	1:49.16	Q
2	2	Jackson Kivuva	Kenya	1:49.17	Q
3	2	Abubaker Haydar Abdalla	Qatar	1:49.19	Q
4	1	Marcin Lewandowski	Poland	1:49.22	Q
5	1	Jamal Hairane	Qatar	1:49.32	Q
6	1	Jonathan Kiprotich Kitilit	Kenya	1:49.34	Q
7	2	Amine Belferar	Algeria	1:49.34	q
8	1	Linus Kiplagat	Bahrain	1:49.59	q
9	1	Roland Christen	Switzerland	1:51.61	
10	1	Jinson Johnson	India	1:52.13	
11	1	Bong Soo Kim	South Korea	1:52.33	
12	2	Jonathan Kipkosgei	Bahrain	1:52.40	
13	2	Diego Villanueva	Venezuela	1:52.78	
14	2	Remi Montero	France	1:52.92	
15	2	Sajad Bahmani	Iran	1:52.93	
16	1	Janis Razgalis	Latvia	1:55.05	

=== Final ===
Rank	Lane	Name	Nationality	Time	Notes
1st place, gold medalist(s)	8	Ali Alderaan	Saudi Arabia	1:45.50	CR
2nd place, silver medalist(s)	4	Jackson Kivuva	Kenya	1:45.70	
3rd place, bronze medalist(s)	3	Marcin Lewandowski	Poland	1:46.36	
4	5	Jonathan Kiprotich Kitilit	Kenya	1:46.43	
5	2	Amine Belferar	Algeria	1:46.46	
6	1	Linus Kiplagat	Bahrain	1:47.15	
7	6	Jamal Hairane	Qatar	1:48.68	
8	7	Abubaker Haydar Abdalla	Qatar	1:50.16	
