= Nguyễn Đình Cương =

Vietnamese middle-distance runner

Medal record

Men's athletics

Representing Vietnam

Southeast Asian Games
Silver medal – second place	2003 Hanoi	800 m
Gold medal – first place	2007 Nakhon Ratchasima	800 m
Gold medal – first place	2007 Nakhon Ratchasima	1500 m
Gold medal – first place	2009 Vientiane	800 m
Gold medal – first place	2009 Vientiane	1500 m
Bronze medal – third place	2011 Palembang	1500 m

Nguyễn Đình Cương (born 1982 in Yên Mô, Ninh Bình) is a middle-distance runner who specializes in the 800 metres. He competed at the 2008 Olympic 800 metres.

== Competition record ==
Year	Competition	Venue	Position	Event	Notes
Representing Vietnam
2003	Southeast Asian Games	Hanoi, Vietnam	2nd	800 m	1:52.05
2005	Asian Championships	Incheon, South Korea	–	800 m	DNF
2005	Asian Championships	Incheon, South Korea	17th	1500 m	3:53.40
2006	Asian Games	Doha, Qatar	9th (h)	800 m	1:53.30
2006	Asian Games	Doha, Qatar	17th (h)	1500 m	3:58.70
2007	Universiade	Bangkok, Thailand	42nd (h)	800 m	1:53.83
2007	Universiade	Bangkok, Thailand	27th (h)	1500 m	4:00.87
2007	Southeast Asian Games	Nakhon Ratchasima, Thailand	1st	800 m	1:51.16
2007	Southeast Asian Games	Nakhon Ratchasima, Thailand	1st	1500 m	3:45.31
2008	Olympic Games	Beijing, China	55th (h)	800 m	1:52.06
2009	Asian Indoor Games	Hanoi, Vietnam	9th (h)	800 m	1:59.11
2009	Asian Championships	Guangzhou, China	14th (h)	800 m	1:54.08
2009	Asian Championships	Guangzhou, China	19th (h)	1500 m	4:03.03
2009	Southeast Asian Games	Vientiane, Laos	1st	800 m	1:50.65
2009	Southeast Asian Games	Vientiane, Laos	1st	1500 m	3:46.58
2010	Asian Games	Guangzhou, China	–	800 m	DQ
2010	Asian Games	Guangzhou, China	19th (h)	1500 m	4:00.83
2011	Asian Championships	Kobe, Japan	15th (h)	800 m	1:58.78
2011	Southeast Asian Games	Palembang, Indonesia	3rd	1500 m	3:49.48
