= Sho Kawamoto =

Japanese middle-distance runner

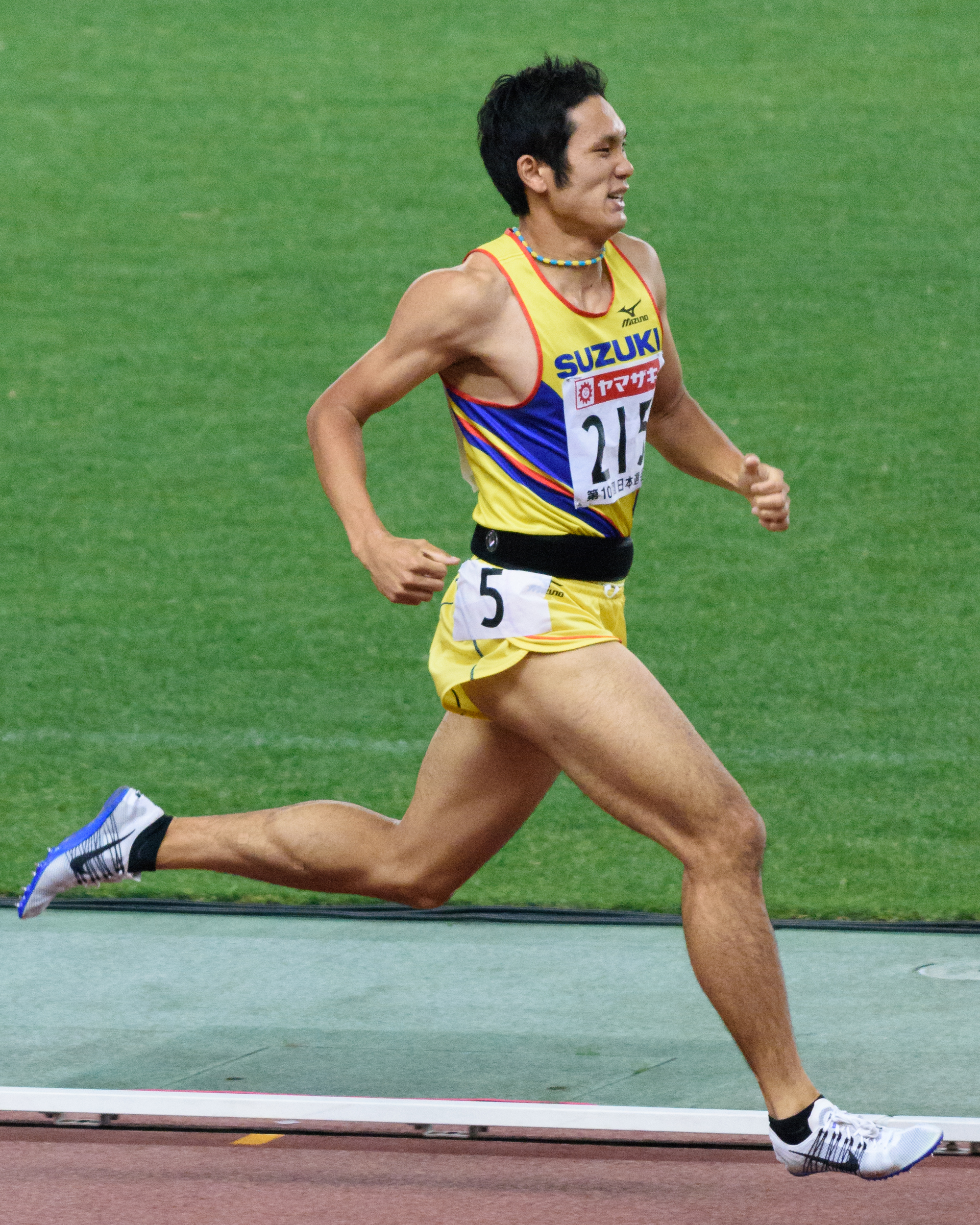

Personal information
- Born: 1 March 1993 (age 33) Nagano Prefecture, Japan
- Education: Nihon University
- Height: 1.75 m (5 ft 9 in)
- Weight: 68 kg (150 lb)

Sport
- Sport: Athletics
- Event: 800 metres

Sho Kawamoto (川元 奨, Kawamoto Shō; born 1 March 1993) is a Japanese middle-distance runner competing primarily in the 800 metres. He represented his country at the 2016 Summer Olympics without advancing from the first round. In addition, he won the bronze medal at the 2015 Asian Championships.

His personal best in the event is 1:45.75 set in Tokyo in 2014. This is the current national record.

== International competitions ==
| Year | Competition | Venue | Position | Event | Notes |
Representing Japan
| 2012 | World Junior Championships | Barcelona, Spain | 15th (sf) | 800 m | 1:50.17 |
| 2013 | Universiade | Kazan, Russia | 8th (sf) | 800 m | 1:48.56 |
| 2013 | Universiade | Kazan, Russia | 5th | 4 × 400 m relay | 3:06.58 |
| 2013 | East Asian Games | Tianjin, China | 1st | 800 m | 1:53.18 |
| 2013 | East Asian Games | Tianjin, China | 2nd | 4 × 400 m relay | 3:07.32 |
| 2014 | Asian Games | Incheon, South Korea | 14th (h) | 800 m | 1:53.24 |
| 2015 | Asian Championships | Wuhan, China | 3rd | 800 m | 1:50.50 |
| 2016 | Olympic Games | Rio de Janeiro, Brazil | 43rd (h) | 800 m | 1:49.41 |
| 2017 | Asian Championships | Bhubaneswar, India | 8th | 800 m | 1:52.62 |
| 2017 | DécaNation | Angers, France | 1st | 800 m | 1:48.50 |
| 2018 | Asian Games | Jakarta, Indonesia | 7th | 800 m | 1:50.87 |
| 2023 | Asian Championships | Bangkok, Thailand | 8th | 800 m | 1:49.59 |
| 2023 | Asian Games | Hangzhou, China | 13th (h) | 800 m | 1:52.93 |
