= Track and field at the 2015 Military World Games – Men's 1500 metres =

The men's 1500 metres event at the 2015 Military World Games was held on 6 and 8 October at the KAFAC Sports Complex.

== Records ==
Prior to this competition, the existing world and CISM record were as follows:

World Record	Hicham El Guerrouj (MAR)	3:26.00	Rome, Italy	14 July 1998
CISM World Record	Mohamed Suleiman (QAT)	3:34.82		1993

== Schedule ==
Date	Time	Round
6 October 2015	12:00	Round 1
8 October 2015	13:55	Final

== Medalists ==
Gold	Silver	Bronze
Fouad Elkaam; Morocco	Benson Seurei; Bahrain	Said Aden Said; Qatar

== Results ==
=== Round 1 ===
Qualification: First 4 in each heat (Q) and next 4 fastest (q) qualified for the final.

Rank	Heat	Name	Nationality	Time	Notes
1	1	Fouad Elkaam	Morocco	3:46.64	Q
2	1	Yassine Hethat	Algeria	3:47.04	Q
3	1	Mohammed Ayoub Tiouali	Bahrain	3:47.11	Q
4	2	Benson Seurei	Bahrain	3:47.93	Q
5	1	Musaab Adam Ali	Qatar	3:47.96	Q
6	2	Said Aden Said	Qatar	3:48.67	Q
7	1	Abdullah Alsalhi	Saudi Arabia	3:48.74	q
8	1	Jonathan Kiprotich Kitilit	Kenya	3:48.78	q
9	2	Szymon Krawczyk	Poland	3:49.07	Q
10	2	Jackson Kivuva	Kenya	3:49.92	Q
11	2	Daniel Castle	United States	3:49.96	q
12	2	Oscar Cavia	Spain	3:50.40	q
13	1	Emmanuel Bor	United States	3:53.53	
14	1	Ryu Ji-San	South Korea	3:54.52	
15	2	Remi Montero	France	3:55.22	
16	1	Janis Razgalis	Latvia	3:58.30	
17	2	Diego Villanueva	Venezuela	3:59.01	
18	1	Joshua Hunte	Barbados	3:59.86	
19	2	Joseph Boland	Canada	4:00.86	
20	1	Florian Seres	Hungary	4:01.45	
21	2	Cristhian Zamora	Uruguay	4:05.99	
22	2	Bo Sung Moon	South Korea	4:10.21	
23	1	Davoodi Akbar	Iran	4:16.43	
24	1	Goran Petrić	Montenegro	4:17.42	
25	2	Stanimir Hristov Bochev	Bulgaria	4:25.30	
26	1	Saso Danevski	Macedonia	5:12.43	
	2	Sajad Bahmani	Iran	DNS	
	1	Emmanuel Chimdzeka	Malawi	DNS	
	2	Pethias Barclays Gondwe Mdoka	Malawi	DNS	

=== Final ===
Rank	Name	Nationality	Time	Notes
1st place, gold medalist(s)	Fouad Elkaam	Morocco	3:44.79	
2nd place, silver medalist(s)	Benson Seurei	Bahrain	3:44.98	
3rd place, bronze medalist(s)	Said Aden Said	Qatar	3:45.64	
4	Mohammed Ayoub Tiouali	Bahrain	3:45.98	
5	Jackson Kivuva	Kenya	3:47.95	
6	Yassine Hethat	Algeria	3:48.46	
7	Musaab Adam Ali	Qatar	3:49.24	
8	Szymon Krawczyk	Poland	3:50.19	
9	Daniel Castle	United States	3:51.13	
10	Jonathan Kiprotich Kitilit	Kenya	3:51.19	
11	Abdullah Alsalhi	Saudi Arabia	3:53.24	
12	Oscar Cavia	Spain	3:55.83	
