= Teng Haining =

Chinese middle-distance runner

Teng Haining (born 25 June 1993) is a Chinese athlete who specialises in the middle-distance events. He won the silver medal in the 800 metres at the 2011 Summer Universiade and 2014 Asian Games.

His 800 metres personal best of 1:46.32 is the current national record.

== Competition record ==
Year	Competition	Venue	Position	Event	Notes
Representing China
2011	Universiade	Shenzhen, China	2nd	800 m	1:46.62
2011	Universiade	Shenzhen, China	4th	1500 m	3:48.71
2012	Asian Indoor Championships	Hangzhou, China	4th	800 m	1:51.05
2012	Asian Junior Championships	Colombo, Sri Lanka	1st	800 m	1:46.56
2012	Asian Junior Championships	Colombo, Sri Lanka	2nd	1500 m	3:43.00
2013	East Asian Games	Tianjin, China	2nd	800 m	1:53.52
2014	Asian Games	Incheon, South Korea	2nd	800 m	1:47.81
2015	Asian Championships	Wuhan, China	11th (h)	800 m	1:55.06

== Personal bests ==
Outdoor'

- 800 metres – 1:46.32 (Beijing 2014)
- 1500 metres – 3:42.05 (Hefei 2011)
