= Mohamad Al-Garni =

Qatari middle-distance runner

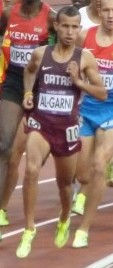
- Al-Garni at the 2012 Summer Olympics

Medal record

Men's athletics

Representing Qatar

Asian Games
Gold medal – first place	2014 Incheon	1500 m
Gold medal – first place	2014 Incheon	5000 m
Gold medal – first place	2022 Hangzhou	1500 m

Asian Indoor Championships
Gold medal – first place	2014 Hangzhou	1500 m
Gold medal – first place	2014 Hangzhou	3000 m
Gold medal – first place	2016 Doha	1500 m
Gold medal – first place	2016 Doha	3000 m
Gold medal – first place	2023 Astana	3000 m
Silver medal – second place	2012 Hangzhou	1500 m
Silver medal – second place	2012 Hangzhou	3000 m
Silver medal – second place	2023 Astana	1500 m

Pan Arab Games
Gold medal – first place	2011 Doha	1500 m

Mohamad Al-Garni (born 2 July 1992) is a Moroccan-born Qatari middle-distance runner. He competed in the 1500 metres competition at the 2012 Summer Olympics.

In 2016 he refused to submit to a doping test, and was subsequently banned from competition for four years between 15 June 2016 and 3 July 2020.

== International competitions ==
Year	Competition	Venue	Position	Event	Notes
Representing Qatar
2009	World Youth Championships	Brixen, Italy	5th	1500 m	3:43.86
2009	World Championships	Berlin, Germany	46th (h)	1500 m	3:50.55
2010	Asian Indoor Championships	Tehran, Iran	2nd	1500 m	3:53.12
2010	Asian Junior Championships	Hanoi, Vietnam	1st	800 m	1:48.13
2010	Asian Junior Championships	Hanoi, Vietnam	1st	1500 m	3:55.94
2010	World Junior Championships	Moncton, Canada	7th	800 m	1:50.16
2010	World Junior Championships	Moncton, Canada	3rd	1500 m	3:38.91
2011	Arab Championships	Al Ain, United Arab Emirates	3rd	1500 m	3:59.23
2011	Pan Arab Games	Doha, Qatar	3rd	1500 m	3:34.61
2012	Asian Indoor Championships	Hangzhou, China	2nd	1500 m	3:58.04
2012	Asian Indoor Championships	Hangzhou, China	2nd	3000 m	7:46.17
2012	World Indoor Championships	Istanbul, Turkey	21st (h)	1500 m	3:47.63
2012	Olympic Games	London, United Kingdom	9th (sf)	1500 m	3:36.78
2013	Asian Championships	Pune, India	2nd	1500 m	3:40.75
2013	World Championships	Moscow, Russia	23rd (h)	1500 m	3:40.01
2014	Asian Indoor Championships	Hangzhou, China	1st	1500 m	3:48.79
2014	Asian Indoor Championships	Hangzhou, China	1st	3000 m	8:08.65
2014	IAAF World Relays	Nassau, Bahamas	7th	4 × 1500 m	15:10.77
2014	Asian Games	Incheon, South Korea	1st	1500 m	3:40.23
2014	Asian Games	Incheon, South Korea	1st	5000 m	13:26.13
2015	Asian Championships	Wuhan, China	1st	1500 m	3:41.42
2016	Asian Indoor Championships	Doha, Qatar	1st	1500 m	3:36.35
2016	Asian Indoor Championships	Doha, Qatar	1st	3000 m	7:39.23
2022	World Indoor Championships	Belgrade, Serbia	29th (h)	3000 m	8:02.86
2022	Islamic Solidarity Games	Konya, Turkey	–	5000 m	DNF
2023	Asian Indoor Championships	Astana, Kazakhstan	2nd	1500 m	3:43.39
2023	Asian Indoor Championships	Astana, Kazakhstan	1st	3000 m	7:55.25
2023	Asian Championships	Bangkok, Thailand	5th	1500 m	3:43.31
2023	Asian Championships	Bangkok, Thailand	5th	5000 m	14:16.48
2023	Asian Games	Hangzhou, China	1st	1500 m	3:38.36
2023	Asian Games	Hangzhou, China	5th	5000 m	13:37.49
