= Amine Belferar =

Algerian middle-distance runner

Personal information
- Nationality: Algerian
- Born: February 16, 1991 (age 35)
- Height: 1.75 m (5 ft 9 in)
- Weight: 65 kg (143 lb)

Sport
- Sport: Men's athletics
- Event: 800 metres

Achievements and titles
- Personal best: 800 metres: 1:45.01 min (2016)

Mohammed El Amine Belferar (born 16 February 1991) is an Algerian male middle-distance runner who competed in the 800 metres. He represented his country at the 2016 Summer Olympics and the World Championships in Athletics in 2013.

He first appeared internationally in 2013: after a run of 1:46.07 minutes in the capital Algiers. He gained selection for the 2013 World Championships in Athletics as a result and competed in the heats only. A member of the Algerian Armed Forces, he ran at the 2015 Military World Games and came fifth with a time close to his best at 1:46.46 minutes.

Belferar set a new personal best of 1:45.01 minutes in Barcelona and was selected to represent Algeria at the 2016 Summer Olympics, where he reached the semi-finals.

== International competitions ==
Year	Competition	Venue	Position	Event	Notes
2013	World Championships	Moscow, Russia	24th (h)	800 m	1:47.17
2015	Military World Games	Mungyeong, South Korea	5th	800 m	1:46.46
2016	Olympic Games	Rio de Janeiro, Brazil	19th (sf)	800 m	1:46.55
2017	Islamic Solidarity Games	Baku, Azerbaijan	3rd	800 m	1:46.44
2017	World Championships	London, United Kingdom	—	800 m	DNF
