= Abdulrahman Suleiman =

Qatari middle-distance runner

Medal record

Men's athletics

Representing Qatar

Asian Championships
Gold medal – first place	2002 Colombo	1500 m
Silver medal – second place	2005 Incheon	800 m

Abdulrahman Suleiman (born 10 January 1984) is a Qatari middle-distance runner who specialises in both the 800 metres and 1500 metres. He was the 2002 Asian champion over 1500 m and represented Qatar at the 2004 Summer Olympics.

== Biography ==
Born in Qatar, he was the second of his family to enjoy success in professional athletics, following in the footsteps of his older brother Mohamed Suleiman who was Qatar's first ever Olympic medallist. Suleiman began competing internationally at youth level: he ran in the 800 m heats of the 1999 World Youth Championships in Athletics and reached the event final at the 2000 World Junior Championships in Athletics the next year. His first medalling performances soon followed, although they came over the longer 1500 m distance – a bronze medal at the 2001 World Youth Championships paved the way for his silver medal at the 2002 World Junior Championships.

Suleiman broke into the global elite at the age of nineteen later that year, taking a gold medal at the 2002 Asian Athletics Championships. Another of his brothers (Nasser Suleiman) won a 5000 metres medal at the same competition and Abdulrahman said of his 1500 m win "I am proud to have kept up a 12-year-old family tradition". The performance at the continental championships earned him a 1500 m place on the Asian team at the 2002 IAAF World Cup. His brother Mohamed was the 1992 champion of the competition, but the younger Suleiman did not scale such heights and finished in seventh place. He represented his country on the Olympic stage at the 2004 Athens Olympics, but he did not manage to progress beyond the heats stage. At the 2005 Asian Athletics Championships he completed a Qatari 1–2 in the 1500 m with Majed Saeed Sultan and Suleiman's runner-up time of 1:44.73 was a new personal best.

He ran at the 2006 IAAF World Indoor Championships and set a Qatari indoor record over 800 m with a time of 1:47.58. He finished fifth in his semi-final, thus he did not make the cut for the 800 m world final. He represented his continent in the 1500 m for a second time at the 2006 IAAF World Cup, and again he was the seventh-place finisher. That year at the Memorial van Damme in Brussels, Suleiman teamed up with Majed Saeed Sultan, Salem Amer Al-Badri and Abubaker Ali Kamal to form a Qatari 4×800 metres relay team. The Kenyan team ran a world record time but Qatar's fourth place in 7:06.66 (four seconds behind) was a new Asian record for the uncommon event.

Suleiman has not competed internationally since 2006.
