= Majed Saeed Sultan =

Qatari middle-distance runner

Medal record

Men's athletics

Representing Qatar

Asian Championships
Gold medal – first place	2005 Incheon	800 m

Majed Saeed Sultan (Arabic: ماجد سعيد سلطان; born Elijah Kosgei on November 3, 1986, in Kenya) is a middle-distance runner now representing Qatar after switching from Kenya. He specializes at the 800 metres, a distance where he became 2004 world junior champion and competed in the Olympic Games in Athens.

In September 2005 he became Asian champion.
