= Mohammad Al-Azemi =

Kuwaiti middle-distance runner

Personal information
- Born: 16 June 1982 (age 44)
- Height: 1.78 m (5 ft 10 in)
- Weight: 64 kg (141 lb)

Sport
- Country: Kuwait
- Sport: Athletics
- Events: 800 metres 1,000 metres 1,500 metres 3,000 metres
Medal record
Men's athletics
Representing Kuwait
Asian Games
Silver medal – second place	2006 Doha	800 m
Asian Championships
Gold medal – first place	2011 Kobe	800 m
Gold medal – first place	2011 Kobe	1500 m
Silver medal – second place	2009 Guangzhou	800 m
Asian Indoor Championships
Gold medal – first place	2010 Tehran	800 m
Gold medal – first place	2012 Hangzhou	800 m
Asian Indoor Games
Gold medal – first place	2007 Macau	800 m
Silver medal – second place	2009 Hanoi	800 m
Bronze medal – third place	2005 Bangkok	800 m
- Updated on 22 July 2012

Mohammad Mutlak Khalif Al-Azemi (Arabic: محمد خلف العازمي; born 16 June 1982) is a Kuwaiti middle-distance runner who specialises in the 800 metres. His 800 m personal bests of 1:44.13 minutes outdoors and 1:48.93 minutes indoors are the Kuwaiti records for the event. He represented his nation at the Olympic Games in 2004, 2008 and 2012, and has also made four appearances at the World Championships in Athletics (2005, 2007, 2009 and 2011).

After a successful career as a youth, he rose to become one of Asia's best middle-distance runners. He was the silver medallist at the 2006 Asian Games and is a three-time Asian Indoor Games medallist. He became the Asian Indoor champion in 2010 and then completed an 800 m/1500 metres double at the 2011 Asian Athletics Championships.

== Career ==
Born in Kuwait City, he was successful in athletics from a young age and won the national under-14 cross country title for his club, Qadsia SC, in 1993. Given his natural talent, he was afforded special support from the Kuwaiti Athletic Federation. He achieved his first international medal at the 1998 Pan Arab Junior Athletics Championships, taking the 800 metres bronze medal. Further success came the following year as he took third in the event at the 1999 World Youth Championships in Athletics then won the silver medal at the Asian Junior Athletics Championships. His 2000 and 2001 seasons were disrupted by his need to focus on studying for his high school exams, but he still managed to win the gold medal at the Gulf Cooperation Council Championships, finish runner-up at the Arab Junior Championships, and win the 2001 Asian Junior bronze.

Illness affected him in 2002, as dust in his home nation was causing him difficulties in training. As a result, he began training abroad instead and a partnership with a new coach, Algerian Abdelkarim Bensaid, saw Al-Azemi achieve Kuwaiti records in 2003. Making his first global appearance at senior level, he ran at the 2003 IAAF World Indoor Championships and set a national record of 1:50.41 minutes. His outdoor season peaked in Budapest when he ran an outright national record time of 1:47.44 minutes. He ran again at the 2004 IAAF World Indoor Championships and achieved a personal best in the outdoor season, running 1:45.25 minutes in Algiers. This was enough to gain him a place on the Kuwaiti Olympic team for the 2004 Athens Olympics, where he ran in the heats stage.

Despite injuries, his career reached new heights in 2005. He was fourth at the Islamic Solidarity Games and ran a season's best of 1:46.67 minutes for fifth at the 2005 Asian Athletics Championships. Al-Azemi reached the semi-finals of the 800 m at the 2005 World Championships in Athletics and ended the year with a bronze medal at the 2005 Asian Indoor Games. He changed coaching staff to Jama Aden in December and the training had quick results, as he ran a national record of 1:44.80 min to win at the Qatar Athletic Super Grand Prix. He improved it further to 1:44.59 min with a win on the 2006 IAAF Golden League circuit at the Bislett Games and had his best run of the year at the Athens Grand Prix Tsiklitiria (1:44.13 min). A close duel with Youssef Saad Kamel at the 2006 Asian Games was the highlight of the year – even though the Kenyan-born runner defeated him he was the silver medallist in the event.

Al-Azemi had his best run of 2007 at the Tsiklitiria meet, running 1:44.55 min, and also won the 800 m at the Bislett Games. He missed the Asian Championships that year, but again reached the semi-finals on the global stage, although he finished last in his race at the 2007 World Championships in Athletics. He gave a national indoor and Games record performance at the 2007 Asian Indoor Games to win his first title at Asian-level competition. After running 1:45.79 min in Casablanca in June 2008 and was chosen to compete at the 2008 Beijing Olympics. He reached the Olympic 800 m semi-finals, but was again last in his race on the world stage.

In 2009, he won the Gulf and Kuwaiti 800 m titles and had a series of wins on the Asian Athletics Grand Prix circuit. On his third consecutive appearance at the World Championships, he was ousted in the heats stage. He was second at the 2009 Arab Athletics Championships and in November he went on to claim the silver medal at the 2009 Asian Indoor Games in an indoor Kuwaiti record of 1:48.93 minutes. The Asian Indoor winner Sajjad Moradi also left Al-Azemi in the runner-up spot at the 2009 Asian Athletics Championships in Guangzhou. In Moradi's absence, however, he won the gold medal at the 2010 Asian Indoor Athletics Championships. This gained him a berth for the 2010 IAAF World Indoor Championships, but he was eliminated in the first round. He attempted to reach the podium at the 2010 Asian Games, but was in poor form and ended up in sixth.

At the 2011 Asian Athletics Championships, he beat regional rival Sajjad Moradi in both the 800 m and the 1500 metres events to complete an Asian title double.

At the 2012 Summer Olympics, he was disqualified for obstructing Marcin Lewandowski in the first heat of the men's 800 metres.
