= Mohammed Al-Salhi =

Saudi Arabian middle-distance runner

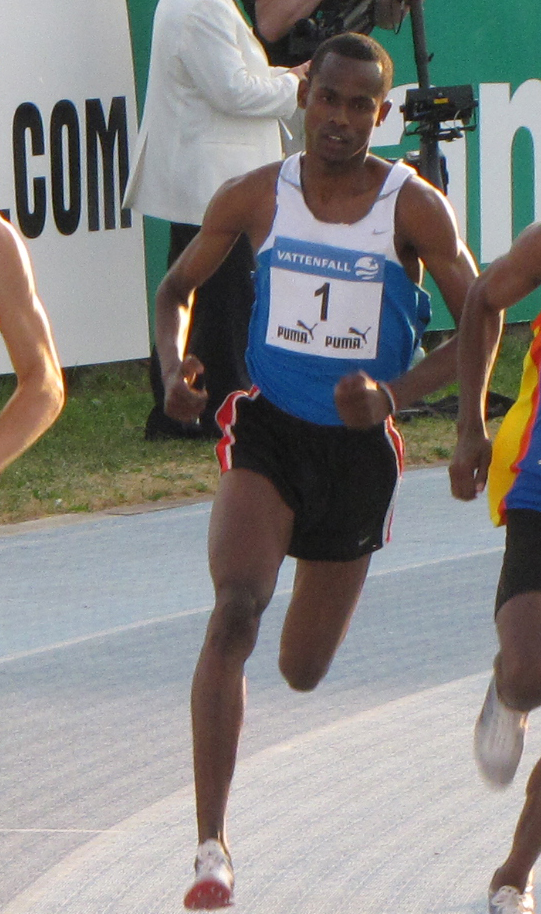
- Al-Salhi at the Lappeenranta Games in Finland (2010)

Personal information
- Born: May 11, 1986 (age 40) Jeddah, Saudi Arabia

Sport
- Country: Saudi Arabia
- Sport: Track
- Events: 400 metres, 800 metres

Achievements and titles
- Personal bests: 400 metres: 45.75; 800 metres: 1:43.66
Medal record
Men's athletics
Representing Saudi Arabia
Asian Games
Gold medal – first place	2002 Busan	4×400 m relay
Gold medal – first place	2006 Doha	4×400 m relay
Gold medal – first place	2010 Guangzhou	4×400 m relay
Asian Championships
Gold medal – first place	2007 Amman	800 m
Gold medal – first place	2007 Amman	4x400 m relay
Gold medal – first place	2013 Pune	4x400 m relay
Silver medal – second place	2015 Wuhan	4x400 m relay
Military World Games
Gold medal – first place	2007 Hyderabad	800 m
Gold medal – first place	2007 Hyderabad	4x400 m relay
Islamic Solidarity Games
Gold medal – first place	2005 Mecca	4x400 m relay
Silver medal – second place	2005 Mecca	800 m
Pan Arab Games
Gold medal – first place	2007 Cairo	4x400 m relay
Gold medal – first place	2011 Doha	4x400 m relay
Silver medal – second place	2007 Cairo	800 m
Arab Championships
Gold medal – first place	2003 Amman	4x400 m relay
Gold medal – first place	2005 Radès	4x400 m relay
Silver medal – second place	2005 Radès	800 m
GCC Championships
Gold medal – first place	2005 Manama	800 m
Asian Junior Championships
Gold medal – first place	2004 Ipoh	400 m
World Youth Championships
Gold medal – first place	2003 Sherbrooke	800 m

Mohammed Obeid Al-Salhi (Arabic: محمد الصالحي, born May 11, 1986) is a Saudi middle distance runner who specializes in the 800 metres.

== Running career ==
He won the gold medal at the 2003 World Youth Championships. He then competed at the 2003 World Championships, the 2004 Olympic Games and the 2005 World Championships without reaching the final.

He then finished fourth at the 2005 Asian Championships, eighth at the 2007 World Championships and fifth at the 2007 World Athletics Final. At the 2007 Pan Arab Games in Cairo, he took the silver medal in the 800 m behind Sudan's Abubaker Kaki, as well as the 4 × 400 m relay gold. On May 8, 2009, he ran his personal best time in the 800 metres, 1:43.66 minutes, achieved in Doha.
