= Athletics at the 2010 Asian Games – Men's 1500 metres =

Men's 1500 metres at the 2010 Asian Games
- Venue: Aoti Main Stadium
- Dates: 22–23 November 2010
- Competitors: 20 from 17 nations

Medalists
gold medal	Mohammed Shaween	Saudi Arabia
silver medal	Sajjad Moradi	Iran
bronze medal	Belal Mansoor Ali	Bahrain

The men's 1500 metres event at the 2010 Asian Games was held at the Aoti Main Stadium, Guangzhou, China on 22–23 November.

== Schedule ==
All times are China Standard Time (UTC+08:00)

Date	Time	Event
Monday, 22 November 2010	09:30	Round 1
Tuesday, 23 November 2010	17:50	Final

== Records ==
Prior to this competition, the existing world, Asian and Games records were as follows.

World Record	Hicham El-Guerrouj (MAR)	3:26.00	Rome, Italy	14 July 1998
Asian Record	Rashid Ramzi (BRN)	3:29.14	Rome, Italy	14 July 2006
Games Record	Daham Najim Bashir (QAT)	3:38.06	Doha, Qatar	10 December 2006

== Results ==
=== Round 1 ===
- Qualification: First 4 in each heat (Q) and the next 4 fastest (q) advance to the final.

==== Heat 1 ====
Rank	Athlete	Time	Notes
1	Mohammed Shaween (KSA)	3:44.51	Q
2	Belal Mansoor Ali (BRN)	3:45.55	Q
3	Zhang Haikun (CHN)	3:46.01	Q
4	Hamza Chatholi (IND)	3:46.68	Q
5	Yasunori Murakami (JPN)	3:46.72	q
6	Artem Kossinov (KAZ)	3:47.07	q
7	Hari Kumar Rimal (NEP)	3:50.15	q
8	Sergey Pakura (KGZ)	3:51.15	q
9	Ajmal Amirov (TJK)	3:52.56	
10	Watcharin Waekachi (THA)	4:02.49	

==== Heat 2 ====
Rank	Athlete	Time	Notes
1	Emad Noor (KSA)	3:53.73	Q
2	Adnan Taess (IRQ)	3:53.79	Q
3	Sajjad Moradi (IRI)	3:53.85	Q
4	Sandeep Karan Singh (IND)	3:53.88	Q
5	Omar Al-Rasheedi (IOC)	3:54.54	
6	Chaminda Indika Wijekoon (SRI)	3:55.25	
7	Qais Al-Mahrooqi (OMA)	3:55.82	
8	Waleed Elayah (YEM)	3:56.72	
9	Yusuf Saad Kamel (BRN)	3:58.80	
10	Nguyễn Đình Cương (VIE)	4:00.83	

=== Final ===
Rank	Athlete	Time	Notes
1st place, gold medalist(s)	Mohammed Shaween (KSA)	3:36.49	GR
2nd place, silver medalist(s)	Sajjad Moradi (IRI)	3:37.09	
3rd place, bronze medalist(s)	Belal Mansoor Ali (BRN)	3:38.39	
4	Emad Noor (KSA)	3:39.35	
5	Zhang Haikun (CHN)	3:41.67	
6	Sandeep Karan Singh (IND)	3:42.79	
7	Hamza Chatholi (IND)	3:44.25	
8	Artem Kossinov (KAZ)	3:44.77	
9	Yasunori Murakami (JPN)	3:46.14	
10	Adnan Taess (IRQ)	3:50.83	
11	Sergey Pakura (KGZ)	3:52.66	
12	Hari Kumar Rimal (NEP)	4:01.44	
