= Athletics at the 2006 Asian Games – Men's 1500 metres =

Men's 1500 metres at the 2006 Asian Games
- Venue: Khalifa International Stadium
- Dates: 8–10 December 2006
- Competitors: 19 from 15 nations

Medalists
gold medal	Daham Najim Bashir	Qatar
silver medal	Belal Mansoor Ali	Bahrain
bronze medal	Rashid Ramzi	Bahrain

The men's 1500 metres competition at the 2006 Asian Games in Doha, Qatar was held on 8 and 10 December 2006 at the Khalifa International Stadium.

== Schedule ==
All times are Arabia Standard Time (UTC+03:00)

Date	Time	Event
Friday, 8 December 2006	16:35	1st round
Sunday, 10 December 2006	19:00	Final

== Records ==
Prior to this competition, the existing world, Asian and Games records were as follows.

World Record	Hicham El-Guerrouj (MAR)	3:26.00	Rome, Italy	14 July 1998
Asian Record	Rashid Ramzi (BRN)	3:29.14	Rome, Italy	14 July 2006
Games Record	Mohamed Suleiman (QAT)	3.40.00	Hiroshima, Japan	16 October 1994

== Results ==
Legend

- DNF — Did not finish

=== 1st round ===
- Qualification: First 4 in each heat (Q) and the next 4 fastest (q) advance to the final.

==== Heat 1 ====
Rank	Athlete	Time	Notes
1	Rashid Ramzi (BRN)	3:42.62	Q
2	Abubaker Ali Kamal (QAT)	3:43.54	Q
3	Fumikazu Kobayashi (JPN)	3:43.55	Q
4	Mohammed Shaween (KSA)	3:44.03	Q
5	Hamza Chatholi (IND)	3:44.35	q
6	Sergey Pakura (KGZ)	3:49.54	q
7	Chen Fu-pin (TPE)	3:49.85	q
8	Ajmal Amirov (TJK)	3:51.23	q
9	Chaminda Indika Wijekoon (SRI)	3:54.00	
10	Mohannad Mustafa (PLE)	4:43.05	

==== Heat 2 ====
Rank	Athlete	Time	Notes
1	Belal Mansoor Ali (BRN)	3:50.25	Q
2	Daham Najim Bashir (QAT)	3:50.51	Q
3	Sajjad Moradi (IRI)	3:51.11	Q
4	Bashar Al-Kufrini (JOR)	3:51.42	Q
5	Othman Yousef (KSA)	3:53.05	
6	Park Young-min (KOR)	3:54.16	
7	Denis Bagrev (KGZ)	3:54.50	
8	Nguyễn Đình Cương (VIE)	3:58.70	
9	Saysana Bannavong (LAO)	4:14.55	

=== Final ===
Rank	Athlete	Time	Notes
1st place, gold medalist(s)	Daham Najim Bashir (QAT)	3:38.06	GR
2nd place, silver medalist(s)	Belal Mansoor Ali (BRN)	3:38.08	
3rd place, bronze medalist(s)	Rashid Ramzi (BRN)	3:38.91	
4	Abubaker Ali Kamal (QAT)	3:41.09	
5	Fumikazu Kobayashi (JPN)	3:42.45	
6	Mohammed Shaween (KSA)	3:42.92	
7	Hamza Chatholi (IND)	3:43.69	
8	Bashar Al-Kufrini (JOR)	3:45.39	
9	Sergey Pakura (KGZ)	3:48.83	
10	Ajmal Amirov (TJK)	3:50.06	
11	Chen Fu-pin (TPE)	3:52.72	
—	Sajjad Moradi (IRI)	DNF	
