= 2011 Asian Athletics Championships – Men's 1500 metres =

The men's 1500 metres at the 2011 Asian Athletics Championships was held at the Kobe Universiade Memorial Stadium on July 8.

== Medalists ==
Gold	Mohammad Al-Azemi; Kuwait
Silver	Sajjad Moradi; Iran
Bronze	Chaminda Wijekoon; Sri Lanka

== Records ==
2011 Asian Athletics Championships
World record	Hicham El Guerrouj (MAR)	3:26.00	Rome, Italy	14 July 1998
Asian record	Rashid Ramzi (BHR)	3:29.14	Rome, Italy	14 July 2006
Championship record	Kim Soon-Hyung (KOR)	3:38.60	Manila, Philippines	1993

=== Final ===
Rank	Name	Nationality	Time	Notes
1st place, gold medalist(s)	Mohammad Al-Azemi	Kuwait	3:42.49	
2nd place, silver medalist(s)	Sajjad Moradi	Iran	3:43.30	
3rd place, bronze medalist(s)	Chaminda Wijekoon	Sri Lanka	3:44.01	
4	Yūya Konishi	Japan	3:46.24	
5	Belal Mansoor Ali	Bahrain	3:47.26	
6	Sang Min Sin	South Korea	3:47.26	
7	Ridwan Ridwan	Indonesia	3:47.52	
8	Moslem Niadoost	Iran	3:50.79	
9	Pranjal Gogoi	India	3:51.53	
10	Hiroshi Ino	Japan	3:52.49	
11	Hari Kumar Rimal	Nepal	3:53.55	
12	Omar Al-Rasheedi	Kuwait	3:57.42	
13	Dorjpalam Batabyar	Mongolia	3:58.58	
14	Mamoun Bali	Palestine	4:16.21	
15	Shifaz Mohamed	Maldives	4:17.91	
