= 2007 World Championships in Athletics – Men's 1500 metres =

The men's 1500 metres at the 2007 World Championships in Athletics was held at the Nagai Stadium on 25, 27 and 29 August. The winning margin was 0.23 seconds.

== Medalists ==
Gold	Silver	Bronze
Bernard Lagat; United States	Rashid Ramzi; Bahrain	Shedrack Kibet Korir; Kenya

== Records ==
Prior to the competition, the following records were as follows.

World record	Hicham El Guerrouj (MAR)	3:26.00	Rome, Italy	14 July 1998
Championship record	Hicham El Guerrouj (MAR)	3:27.65	Seville, Spain	14 August 1999
World Leading	Alan Webb (USA)	3:30.54	Saint-Denis, France	6 July 2007

== Schedule ==
Date	Time	Round
August 25, 2007	11:25	Heats
August 27, 2007	20:40	Semifinals
August 29, 2007	22:05	Final

== Results ==
KEY:	q	Fastest non-qualifiers	Q	Qualified	WR	World record	AR	Area record	NR	National record	PB	Personal best	SB	Seasonal best

=== Heats ===
Qualification: First 6 in each heat (Q) and the next 6 fastest (q) advance to the semifinals.

Rank	Heat	Name	Nationality	Time	Notes
1	2	Mehdi Baala	France	3:38.65	Q
2	2	Rashid Ramzi	Bahrain	3:38.72	Q, SB
3	2	Mohamed Moustaoui	Morocco	3:39.54	Q
4	2	Shedrack Kibet Korir	Kenya	3:39.55	Q
5	2	Andrew Baddeley	United Kingdom	3:39.60	Q
6	2	Sergio Gallardo	Spain	3:39.92	Q
7	2	Nick Willis	New Zealand	3:40.18	q
8	1	Asbel Kiprop	Kenya	3:40.65	Q
9	1	Alan Webb	United States	3:40.73	Q
10	1	Juan Carlos Higuero	Spain	3:40.93	Q
11	1	Youssef Baba	Morocco	3:40.96	Q
12	1	Antar Zerguelaïne	Algeria	3:40.97	Q
13	2	Juan Luis Barrios	Mexico	3:41.05	q
14	2	Fumikazu Kobayashi	Japan	3:41.19	q
15	3	Arturo Casado	Spain	3:41.33	Q
16	1	Kevin Sullivan	Canada	3:41.39	Q
17	3	Mekonnen Gebremedhin	Ethiopia	3:41.43	Q
18	2	Sajjad Moradi	Iran	3:41.49	q
19	1	Mohammed Shaween	Saudi Arabia	3:41.58	q
20	3	Bernard Lagat	United States	3:41.68	Q
21	3	Tarek Boukensa	Algeria	3:41.71	Q
22	3	Christian Obrist	Italy	3:41.74	Q
23	3	Belal Mansoor Ali	Bahrain	3:41.87	Q
24	3	Daniel Kipchirchir Komen	Kenya	3:41.96	q
25	1	Ivan Heshko	Ukraine	3:42.08	
26	1	Javier Carriqueo	Argentina	3:42.20	
27	1	Mounir Yemmouni	France	3:42.68	
28	2	Deresse Mekonnen	Ethiopia	3:43.15	
29	3	Abdalaati Iguider	Morocco	3:43.25	
30	1	Hudson de Souza	Brazil	3:43.37	
31	3	Mark Fountain	Australia	3:43.51	
32	2	Kamal Boulahfane	Algeria	3:43.88	
33	3	Byron Piedra	Ecuador	3:45.59	
34	3	Gareth Hyett	New Zealand	3:45.70	
35	2	Leonel Manzano	United States	3:45.97	
36	1	Ansu Sowe	Gambia	3:50.77	NR
37	3	Chauncy Master	Malawi	3:55.18	
38	1	Sevak Yeghikyan	Armenia	4:00.61	
39	3	Hem Bunting	Cambodia	4:08.31	SB
40	3	Serdar Nurmyradov	Turkmenistan	4:10.42	
41	2	Saysana Bannavong	Laos	4:19.80	

=== Semifinals ===
Qualification: First 6 in each semifinal (Q) and the next 2 fastest (q) advance to the final.

Rank	Heat	Name	Nationality	Time	Notes
1	2	Rashid Ramzi	Bahrain	3:40.53	Q
2	2	Antar Zerguelaïne	Algeria	3:40.79	Q
3	2	Arturo Casado	Spain	3:40.83	Q
4	2	Belal Mansoor Ali	Bahrain	3:41.01	Q
5	2	Alan Webb	United States	3:41.08	Q
6	2	Sergio Gallardo	Spain	3:41.14	q
7	2	Shedrack Kibet Korir	Kenya	3:41.15	q
8	2	Juan Luis Barrios	Mexico	3:41.17	
9	2	Kevin Sullivan	Canada	3:41.27	
10	1	Bernard Lagat	United States	3:42.39	Q
11	1	Tarek Boukensa	Algeria	3:42.88	Q
12	2	Christian Obrist	Italy	3:42.93	
13	1	Asbel Kiprop	Kenya	3:42.99	Q
14	1	Andrew Baddeley	United Kingdom	3:43.03	Q
15	1	Nick Willis	New Zealand	3:43.34	Q
16	1	Mohamed Moustaoui	Morocco	3:43.39	
17	1	Mekonnen Gebremedhin	Ethiopia	3:43.41	
18	2	Fumikazu Kobayashi	Japan	3:43.64	
19	1	Juan Carlos Higuero	Spain	3:44.15	q
20	2	Mohammed Shaween	Saudi Arabia	3:44.54	
21	1	Sajjad Moradi	Iran	3:46.21	
22	1	Daniel Kipchirchir Komen	Kenya	4:02.95	
23	1	Youssef Baba	Morocco	4:16.23	q
	1	Mehdi Baala	France		DSQ

Note: Mehdi Baala originally won the spot in the final but was later disqualified for causing a collision during his race. Additional spots in the final were awarded to Juan Carlos Higuero and Youssef Baba who suffered in that collision.

=== Final ===
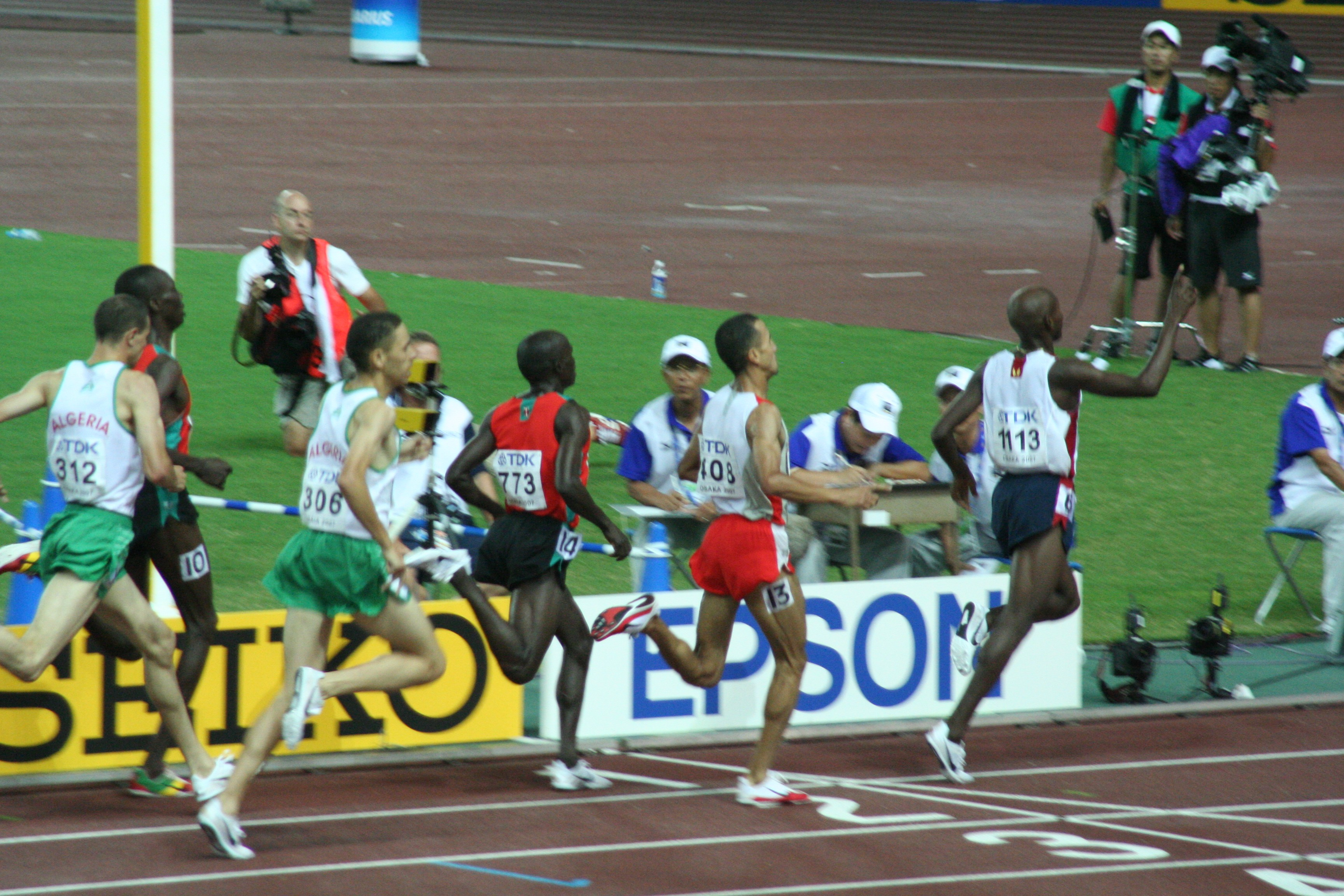
The finish of the final

Rank	Name	Nationality	Time	Notes
1st place, gold medalist(s)	Bernard Lagat	United States	3:34.77	
2nd place, silver medalist(s)	Rashid Ramzi	Bahrain	3:35.00	SB
3rd place, bronze medalist(s)	Shedrack Kibet Korir	Kenya	3:35.04	
4	Asbel Kiprop	Kenya	3:35.24	PB
5	Tarek Boukensa	Algeria	3:35.26	
6	Antar Zerguelaïne	Algeria	3:35.29	
7	Arturo Casado	Spain	3:35.62	
8	Alan Webb	United States	3:35.69	
9	Andrew Baddeley	Great Britain	3:35.95	
10	Nick Willis	New Zealand	3:36.13	
11	Belal Mansoor Ali	Bahrain	3:36.44	
12	Sergio Gallardo	Spain	3:37.03	
13	Juan Carlos Higuero	Spain	3:38.43	
14	Youssef Baba	Morocco	3:38.78	
