= Athletics at the 2009 Summer Universiade – Men's 1500 metres =

The men's 1500 metres event at the 2009 Summer Universiade was held on 7–9 July.

== Medalists ==
Gold	Silver	Bronze
Vyacheslav Sokolov; Russia	Samir Khadar; Algeria	Goran Nava; Serbia

== Results ==
=== Heats ===
Qualification: First 3 of each heat (Q) and the next 3 fastest (q) qualified for the final.

Rank	Heat	Name	Nationality	Time	Notes
1	1	Mohammed Shaween	Saudi Arabia	3:41.30	Q
2	1	Goran Nava	Serbia	3:41.65	Q
3	1	Byron Piedra	Ecuador	3:43.08	Q
4	1	Mthobisi Baloyi	South Africa	3:43.37	q
5	1	Artem Kossinov	Kazakhstan	3:43.43	q, PB
6	1	Hélio Gomes	Portugal	3:44.48	q
7	4	Samir Jouaher	Morocco	3:44.49	Q
8	1	Timothy Konoval	Canada	3:44.62	
9	4	Mirko Petrović	Serbia	3:44.81	Q
10	4	Robert Boorsma	Canada	3:45.00	Q
11	4	Oleksandr Borysyuk	Ukraine	3:45.28	
12	4	Aleksei Popov	Russia	3:45.99	
13	4	Ajmal Amirov	Tajikistan	3:46.18	PB
14	4	Pharson Magagane	South Africa	3:46.60	
15	4	Pablo Solares	Mexico	3:46.85	
16	2	Ryan Gregson	Australia	3:47.83	Q
17	2	Samir Khadar	Algeria	3:47.87	Q
18	2	Cristian Vorovenci	Romania	3:47.92	Q
19	2	Mario Scapini	Italy	3:48.07	
20	1	Roman Fosti	Estonia	3:48.15	
21	2	Tomáš Belada	Czech Republic	3:48.89	
22	2	Vasilios Papaioanov	Greece	3:48.90	
23	1	Luca Leone	Italy	3:51.07	
24	1	Isaiah Msibi	Swaziland	3:51.37	
25	1	Kristof Shaanika	Namibia	3:52.17	PB
26	2	Nikolai Vedehin	Estonia	3:52.54	
27	2	Sin Sang-min	South Korea	3:52.74	
28	2	Johan Bagge	Sweden	3:55.76	
29	3	Vyacheslav Sokolov	Russia	3:56.27	Q
30	3	Víctor Montaner	Spain	3:56.97	Q
31	3	Ahmed Mainy	Morocco	3:57.45	Q
32	3	Mikael Bergdahl	Finland	3:57.83	
33	3	Raul Botezan	Romania	3:58.60	
34	3	Peter Kastelić	Slovenia	3:59.28	
35	3	Nenad Tosović	Bosnia and Herzegovina	4:01.68	
36	2	Chan Ka Ho	Hong Kong	4:11.15	
37	2	Jaber Al-Shabibi	Oman	4:22.72	
38	1	Tariq Al-Maashani	Oman	4:45.74	
39	3	Rachid Idriss	Libya	4:46.93	
40	4	Sami Al-Shehri	Saudi Arabia	5:02.11	
	2	Sajjad Moradi	Iran	DNF	
	3	Bruno Albuquerque	Portugal	DNF	q
	1	Moritz Waldmann	Germany	DNS	
	3	Simon Ayeko	Uganda	DNS	
	3	Brian Lindberg	Denmark	DNS	
	4	Abdelmunim Tibin	Sudan	DNS	

=== Final ===
Rank	Name	Nationality	Time	Notes
1st place, gold medalist(s)	Vyacheslav Sokolov	Russia	3:42.49	
2nd place, silver medalist(s)	Samir Khadar	Algeria	3:42.50	
3rd place, bronze medalist(s)	Goran Nava	Serbia	3:42.88	
4	Ryan Gregson	Australia	3:43.10	
5	Ahmed Mainy	Morocco	3:43.76	PB
6	Víctor Montaner	Spain	3:44.02	
7	Cristian Vorovenci	Romania	3:44.60	
8	Mthobisi Baloyi	South Africa	3:45.03	
9	Artem Kossinov	Kazakhstan	3:45.32	
10	Hélio Gomes	Portugal	3:45.48	
11	Mirko Petrović	Serbia	3:46.29	
12	Bruno Albuquerque	Portugal	3:47.92	
13	Byron Piedra	Ecuador	3:50.11	
14	Samir Jouaher	Morocco	3:54.59	
15	Robert Boorsma	Canada	3:54.64	
	Mohammed Shaween	Saudi Arabia	DNF	
