= 2007 Asian Athletics Championships – Men's 1500 metres =

The men's 1500 metres event at the 2007 Asian Athletics Championships was held in Amman, Jordan on July 25.

== Results ==
Rank	Name	Nationality	Time	Notes
1st place, gold medalist(s)	Mohammed Othman Shaween	Saudi Arabia	3:46.85	
2nd place, silver medalist(s)	Sajjad Moradi	Iran	3:47.01	
3rd place, bronze medalist(s)	Abubaker Ali Kamal	Qatar	3:47.22	
4	Hamza Chatholi	India	3:49.11	
5	Bashar Al-Kafrini	Jordan	3:51.71	
6	Sajeesh Joseph	India	3:53.89	
7	Denis Bagrev	Kyrgyzstan	3:54.18	
8	Vadivellan Mahendran	Malaysia	3:55.57	
9	Yuri Chechun	Kyrgyzstan	3:56.79	
10	Fumikazu Kobayashi	Japan	3:58.25	
11	Saputro Hariyono	Indonesia	4:01.16	
12	Daham Najim Bashir	Qatar	4:06.72	
13	Omar Al-Rasheedi	Kuwait	4:14.88	
	Muhammad Mustafa	Palestine	DNS	
	Mohammed Al-Yafaee	Yemen	DNS	
