= 2013 Asian Athletics Championships – Men's 1500 metres =

The men's 1500 metres event at the 2013 Asian Athletics Championships was held at the Shree Shiv Chhatrapati Sports Complex. The final took place on 5 July.

== Medalists ==
Gold	Silver	Bronze
Emad Hamed Nour; Saudi Arabia	Mohamad Al-Garni; Qatar	Belal Mansoor Ali; Bahrain

== Results ==
=== Heats ===
First 5 in each heat (Q) and 2 best performers (q) advanced to the semifinals.

Rank	Heat	Name	Nationality	Time	Notes
1	2	Mohamad Al-Garni	Qatar	3:51.23	Q
2	2	Sandeep Karan Singh	India	3:51.48	Q
3	2	Rashid Ramzi	Bahrain	3:51.63	Q
4	1	Belal Mansoor Ali	Bahrain	3:52.16	Q
5	2	Abdullah Obaid Al-Salhi	Saudi Arabia	3:52.28	Q
6	1	Emad Noor	Saudi Arabia	3:52.67	Q
7	2	Sajjad Moradi	Iran	3:52.91	Q
8	1	Hamza Driouch	Qatar	3:53.90	Q
9	1	Amassri Wesam	Palestine	3:54.40	Q
10	2	Pranjal Gogoi	India	3:55.18	q
11	2	Mohammad Al-Azemi	Kuwait	3:55.30	q
12	1	Yuki Akimoto	Japan	4:03.88	Q
13	2	Adilet Kyshtakbekov	Kyrgyzstan	4:04.28	
14	2	Kalyan Baniya	Nepal	4:04.81	
15	1	Zhao Ran	China	4:12.91	
16	1	Augusto Ramos Soares	Timor-Leste	4:22.28	
17	1	Ahmed Hassan	Maldives	4:23.54	
18	2	Shifaz Mohamed	Maldives	4:26.05	
19	2	Wacharin Waekachi	Thailand	4:28.46	
	1	Amir Moradi	Iran	DNF	
	1	Omar Al-Rasheedi	Kuwait	DNS	

=== Final ===
Rank	Name	Nationality	Time	Notes
1st place, gold medalist(s)	Emad Noor	Saudi Arabia	3:39.51	
2nd place, silver medalist(s)	Mohamad Al-Garni	Qatar	3:40.75	
3rd place, bronze medalist(s)	Belal Mansoor Ali	Bahrain	3:40.96	
4	Sajjad Moradi	Iran	3:41.60	
5	Hamza Driouch	Qatar	3:44.70	
6	Abdullah Obaid Al-Salhi	Saudi Arabia	3:48.44	
7	Sandeep Karan Singh	India	3:50.41	
8	Amassri Wesam	Palestine	3:54.35	
9	Pranjal Gogoi	India	3:56.01	
10	Yuki Akimoto	Japan	4:06.70	
	Mohammad Al-Azemi	Kuwait	DNF	
	Rashid Ramzi	Bahrain	DNF	
