= 2008 IAAF World Indoor Championships – Men's 1500 metres =

== Medalists ==
Gold
Deresse Mekonnen	Ethiopia
Silver
Daniel Kipchirchir Komen	Kenya
Bronze
Juan Carlos Higuero	Spain

== Heats ==
Heat	Pos	Name	Country	Mark	Q
1	1	Deresse Mekonnen	Ethiopia	3:39.74	Q
1	2	Nicholas Willis	New Zealand	3:40.66 PB	Q
1	3	Carsten Schlangen	Germany	3:41.54	
1	4	Michael East	United Kingdom	3:41.68	
1	5	Belal Mansoor Ali	Bahrain	3:41.91	
1	6	James Nolan	Ireland	3:42.12	
1	7	Christian Obrist	Italy	3:45.46	
1	8	Guillaume Éraud	France	3:46.11	
1	9	David Freeman	Puerto Rico	3:51.35	
1	10	Sergey Pakura	Kyrgyzstan	3:57.28 SB	
2	1	Daniel Kipchirchir Komen	Kenya	3:39.07	Q
2	2	Juan Carlos Higuero	Spain	3:39.46	Q
2	3	Youssef Baba	Morocco	3:39.89	q
2	4	Rob Myers	United States	3:41.73	
2	5	Christoph Lohse	Germany	3:42.25	
2	6	Sergey Ivanov	Russia	3:43.88	
2	7	Abubaker Ali Kamal	Qatar	3:45.95	
2	8	Mircea Bogdan	Romania	3:55.32 PB	
2	9	Maung Chet	Myanmar	4:04.65 NR	
2		Kamal Boulahfane	Algeria	DNF	
2		James McIlroy	United Kingdom	DNF	
3	1	Mekonnen Gebremedhin	Ethiopia	3:37.16	Q
3	2	Suleiman Kipses Simotwo	Kenya	3:37.23	Q
3	3	Rashid Ramzi	Bahrain	3:37.31 PB	q
3	4	Arturo Casado	Spain	3:40.99	q
3	5	Abdelkader Hachlaf	Morocco	3:42.26	
3	6	Thamer Kamal Ali	Qatar	3:44.17	
3	7	Russell Brown	United States	3:47.19	
3	8	Mounir Yemmouni	France	3:48.26	
3	9	Pablo Solares	Mexico	3:48.78	
3	10	Ajmal Amirov	Tajikistan	3:57.47 SB	
3	11	Kemal Koyuncu	Turkey	3:57.70 PB	

== Final ==
Pos	Name	Country	Mark
Gold medal	Deresse Mekonnen	Ethiopia	3:38.23
Silver medal	Daniel Kipchirchir Komen	Kenya	3:38.54
Bronze medal	Juan Carlos Higuero	Spain	3:38.82
4	Arturo Casado	Spain	3:38.88
5	Rashid Ramzi	Bahrain	3:40.26
6	Mekonnen Gebremedhin	Ethiopia	3:40.42
7	Suleiman Kipses Simotwo	Kenya	3:41.04
8	Youssef Baba	Morocco	3:44.50
	Nicholas Willis	New Zealand	DSQ

Intermediate	Athlete	Country	Mark
200m	Daniel Kipchirchir Komen	Kenya	27.88
400m	Deresse Mekonnen	Ethiopia	57.72
600m	Daniel Kipchirchir Komen	Kenya	1:28.71
800m	Youssef Baba	Morocco	1:59.10
1000m	Deresse Mekonnen	Ethiopia	2:29.34
1200m	Deresse Mekonnen	Ethiopia	2:58.06
1400m	Deresse Mekonnen	Ethiopia	3:25.14
