= 2009 Asian Athletics Championships – Men's 1500 metres =

The men's 1500 metres event at the 2009 Asian Athletics Championships was held at the Guangdong Olympic Stadium on November 10–11.

== Medalists ==
Gold	Silver	Bronze
Mohammed Shaween; Saudi Arabia	Chaminda Wijekoon; Sri Lanka	Hamza Chatholi; India

== Results ==
=== Heats ===
Rank	Heat	Name	Nationality	Time	Notes
1	1	Mohammed Shaween	Saudi Arabia	3:44.82	Q
2	1	Hamza Chatholi	India	3:46.24	Q
3	1	Chaminda Wijekoon	Sri Lanka	3:46.26	Q
4	1	Shin Sang-min	South Korea	3:47.41	Q
5	1	Zhang Guolin	China	3:47.53	q
5	2	Emad Noor	Saudi Arabia	3:47.53	Q
7	1	Omar Al-Rasheedi	Kuwait	3:47.55	Q
8	2	Yu Zhiyang	China	3:47.58	Q
9	2	Adnan Al-Mntfage	Iraq	3:47.66	Q, SB
10	2	Sunil Kumar	India	3:47.90	q
11	2	Vadivellan Mahemdran	Malaysia	3:50.20	q
12	2	Hari Kumar Rimal	Nepal	3:50.76	q
13	2	Fumikazu Kobayashi	Japan	3:50.93	
14	1	Mohd Jironi Riduan	Malaysia	3:51.19	SB
15	1	Abubaker Ali Kamal	Qatar	3:52.25	
16	1	Sergei Pakura	Kyrgyzstan	3:55.13	
17	1	Tha'er Aljohar	Jordan	3:55.77	PB
18	2	Ajmal Amirov	Tajikistan	4:02.73	
19	2	Nguyen Dinh Cuong	Vietnam	4:03.03	
	2	Sajjad Moradi	Iran	DNF	
	1	Belal Mansoor Ali	Bahrain	DNS	

=== Final ===
Rank	Name	Nationality	Time	Notes
1st place, gold medalist(s)	Mohammed Shaween	Saudi Arabia	3:46.08	
2nd place, silver medalist(s)	Chaminda Wijekoon	Sri Lanka	3:47.01	
3rd place, bronze medalist(s)	Hamza Chatholi	India	3:48.44	
4	Emad Noor	Saudi Arabia	3:49.25	
5	Sunil Kumar	India	3:49.38	
6	Yu Zhiyang	China	3:49.48	
7	Adnan Al-Mntfage	Iraq	3:49.84	
8	Zhang Guolin	China	3:52.41	
9	Omar Al-Rasheedi	Kuwait	3:55.02	
10	Vadivellan Mahemdran	Malaysia	3:55.32	
11	Shin Sang-min	South Korea	3:59.56	
12	Hari Kumar Rimal	Nepal	4:03.85	
