= Athletics at the 2008 Summer Olympics – Men's 1500 metres =

Men's 1500 metres at the Games of the XXIX Olympiad
- Olympic Athletics
- Venue: Beijing National Stadium
- Dates: August 15 (heats); August 17 (semifinals); August 19 (final)
- Competitors: 48 from 30 nations
- Winning time: 3:33.11

Medalists
1st place, gold medalist(s)		Asbel Kiprop; Kenya
2nd place, silver medalist(s)		Nicholas Willis; New Zealand
3rd place, bronze medalist(s)		Mehdi Baala; France

The men's 1500 metres at the 2008 Summer Olympics took place on 15–19 August at the Beijing National Stadium. Forty-eight athletes from 30 nations competed.

The qualifying standards were 3:36.60 (A standard) and 3:39.00 (B standard).

The initial winner, Rashid Ramzi of Bahrain, tested positive for the blood-booster CERA and was disqualified on November 18, 2009. After the disqualification, the event was won by Asbel Kiprop of Kenya, the nation's fourth title in the event. It was the fourth straight Games with a Kenyan on the podium in the event; the United States (six times from 1896 to 1920) and Great Britain (four times from 1908 to 1924) were the only other nations to have accomplished that. Nicholas Willis's silver was New Zealand's first medal in the men's 1500 metres since 1976. Mehdi Baala's bronze was France's first medal in the event since 1960.

== Background ==
This was the 26th appearance of the event, which is one of 12 athletics events to have been held at every Summer Olympics. Five finalists from 2004 returned: silver medalist Bernard Lagat (who since immigrated from Kenya to the United States), fifth-place finisher Ivan Heshko of Ukraine, seventh-place finisher Reyes Estévez of Spain, tenth-place finisher Mulugeta Wendimu of Ethiopia, and eleventh-place finisher Kamal Boulahfane of Algeria. Rashid Ramzi of Bahrain, a semifinalist in 2004, was now the favorite, with the two men who had medalled in both 2000 and 2004 either retired (Hicham El Guerrouj) or competing but injured (Lagat).

Ecuador, Eritrea, and Serbia each made their first appearance in the event. The United States made its 25th appearance, most of all nations (having missed only the boycotted 1980 Games).

== Qualification ==
Each National Olympic Committee (NOC) was able to enter up to three entrants providing they had met the A qualifying standard (3:36.00) in the qualifying period (1 January 2007 to 23 July 2008). NOCs were also permitted to enter one athlete providing he had met the B standard (3:39.00) in the same qualifying period.

== Competition format ==
The competition was again three rounds (used previously in 1952 and since 1964). The "fastest loser" system introduced in 1964 was used for both the first round and semifinals. The 12-man semifinals and finals introduced in 1984 and used since 1992 were retained. The field was slightly larger than in past Games, expanding the number of heats from three to four.

There were four heats in the first round, each with 12 or 13 runners (before withdrawals). The top five runners in each heat, along with the next four fastest overall, advanced to the semifinals. The 24 semifinalists were divided into two semifinals, each with 12 runners. The top five men in each semifinal, plus the next two fastest overall, advanced to the 12-man final.

== Records ==
Prior to this competition, the existing world record, Olympic record, and world leading time were as follows:

World record	Hicham El Guerrouj (MAR)	3:26.00	Rome, Italy	14 July 1998
Olympic record	Noah Ngeny (KEN)	3:32.07	Sydney, Australia	29 September 2000
World Leading	Daniel Komen (KEN)	3:31.49	Fontvieille, Monaco	29 July 2008

No new world or Olympic records were set for this event. The following national records were established during the competition:

Nation	Athlete	Round	Time
Estonia	Tiidrek Nurme	Heat 3	3:38.59

== Schedule ==
All times are China Standard Time (UTC+8)

Date	Time	Round
Friday, 15 August 2008	19:10	Round 1
Sunday, 17 August 2008	21:55	Semifinals
Tuesday, 19 August 2008	22:50	Final

== Results ==
=== Round 1 ===
==== Heat 1 ====
Rank	Lane	Athlete	Nation	Time	Notes
1	7	Mehdi Baala	France	3:35.87	Q
2	2	Nicholas Willis	New Zealand	3:36.01	Q
3	9	Daham Naim Bashir	Qatar	3:36.05	Q
4	1	Tarek Boukensa	Algeria	3:36.11	Q
5	11	Deresse Mekonnen	Ethiopia	3:36.22	Q
6	4	Leonel Manzano	United States	3:36.67	Q
7	3	Javier Carriqueo	Argentina	3:39.36	
8	12	Reyes Estevez	Spain	3:39.62	
9	5	Taylor Milne	Canada	3:41.56	
10	8	Youssef Baba	Morocco	3:42.13	
11	10	Vyacheslav Shabunin	Russia	3:42.53	
—	6	Juan Luis Barrios	Mexico	DNS	

==== Heat 2 ====
Rank	Lane	Athlete	Nation	Time	Notes
1	3	Asbel Kiprop	Kenya	3:41.28	Q
2	1	Nathan Brannen	Canada	3:41.45	Q
3	2	Juan Carlos Higuero	Spain	3:41.70	Q
4	5	Bernard Lagat	United States	3:41.98	Q
5	13	Antar Zerguelaine	Algeria	3:42.30	Q
6	12	Goran Nava	Serbia	3:42.92	
7	11	Thomas Lancashire	Great Britain	3:43.40	
8	8	Alistair Cragg	Ireland	3:44.90	
9	6	Hais Welday	Eritrea	3:45.06	
10	9	Mohammed Othman Shaween	Saudi Arabia	3:45.82	
11	4	Mitchell Kealey	Australia	3:46.31	
12	10	Isiah Msibi	Swaziland	3:51.35	PB
—	7	Ivan Heshko	Ukraine	DNS	

==== Heat 3 ====
Rank	Lane	Athlete	Nation	Time	Notes
1	9	Juan van Deventer	South Africa	3:36.32	Q
2	5	Arturo Casado	Spain	3:36.42	Q
3	8	Andrew Baddeley	Great Britain	3:36.47	Q
4	7	Abdalaati Iguider	Morocco	3:36.48	Q
5	6	Lopez Lomong	United States	3:36.70	Q
6	12	Belal Mansoor Ali	Bahrain	3:36.84	q
7	2	Hudson de Souza	Brazil	3:37.06	
8	4	Demma Daba	Ethiopia	3:37.78	
9	11	Tiidrek Nurme	Estonia	3:38.59	PB, NR
10	1	David Freeman	Puerto Rico	3:39.70	SB
11	10	Nicholas Kemboi	Kenya	3:41.56	
12	3	Byron Piedra	Ecuador	3:45.57	
13	13	Abdalla Abdelgadir	Sudan	3:47.65	

==== Heat 4 ====
Rank	Lane	Athlete	Nation	Time	Notes
~~1~~	3	Rashid Ramzi	Bahrain	~~3:32.89~~	Q, DPG
2	4	Mohamed Moustaoui	Morocco	3:34.80	Q
3	9	Augustine Kiprono Choge	Kenya	3:35.47	Q
4	6	Christian Obrist	Italy	3:35.91	Q, SB
5	5	Kevin Sullivan	Canada	3:36.05	Q
6	7	Carsten Schlangen	Germany	3:36.34	q
7	1	Mulugeta Wendimu	Ethiopia	3:36.67	q
8	2	Kamal Thamer Ali	Qatar	3:41.08	
9	10	Mahamoud Farah	Djibouti	3:43.62	
10	8	Chauncy Master	Malawi	3:44.96	
11	11	Kamel Boulahfane	Algeria	3:45.59	
12	12	Jeffrey Riseley	Australia	3:53.95	

==== Overall results for round 1 ====
Heat	Lane	Athlete	Country	PB	SB	Time	Notes
1	1	Tarek Boukensa	Algeria	3:30.92	3:31.98	3:36.11	Q
1	2	Nicholas Willis	New Zealand	3:32.17	3:33.51	3:36.01	Q
1	3	Javier Carriqueo	Argentina	3:38.62	3:39.36	3:39.36	
1	4	Leonel Manzano	United States	3:35.29	3:36.67	3:36.67	q
1	5	Taylor Milne	Canada	3:36.00	3:36.00	3:41.56	
1	6	Juan Luis Barrios	Mexico	3:37.71	3:37.87	DNS	
1	7	Mehdi Baala	France	3:28.98	3:32.00	3:35.87	Q
1	8	Youssef Baba	Morocco	3:32.13	3:33.85	3:42.13	
1	9	Daham Naim Bashir	Qatar	3:31.04	3:34.77	3:36.05	Q
1	10	Vyacheslav Shabunin	Russia	3:32.28	3:37.99	3:42.53	
1	11	Deresse Mekonnen	Ethiopia	3:33.71	3:33.71	3:36.22	Q
1	12	Reyes Estevez	Spain	3:30.57	3:34.98	3:39.62	
2	1	Nathan Brannen	Canada	3:34.65	3:34.65	3:41.45	Q
2	2	Juan Carlos Higuero	Spain	3:31.57	3:32.57	3:41.70	Q
2	3	Asbel Kiprop	Kenya	3:31.64	3:31.64	3:41.28	Q
2	4	Mitchell Kealey	Australia	3:36.21	3:36.21	3:46.31	
2	5	Bernard Lagat	United States	3:26.34	3:35.14	3:41.98	Q
2	6	Hais Welday	Eritrea	3:37.25	3:37.25	3:45.06	
2	7	Ivan Heshko	Ukraine	3:30.33	3:43.95	DNS	
2	8	Alistair Cragg	Ireland	3:36.18	3:39.12	3:44.90	
2	9	Mohammed Othman Shaween	Saudi Arabia	3:33.90	3:33.90	3:45.82	
2	10	Isiah Msibi	Swaziland	3:51.35	3:51.35	3:51.35	PB
2	11	Thomas Lancashire	Great Britain	3:35.33	3:35.33	3:43.40	
2	12	Goran Nava	Serbia	3:38.35	3:38.35	3:42.92	
2	13	Antar Zerguelaine	Algeria	3:31.95	3:33.32	3:42.30	Q
3	1	David Freeman	Puerto Rico	3:38.90	3:39.70	3:39.70	SB
3	2	Hudson de Souza	Brazil	3:33.25	3:36.89	3:37.06	
3	3	Byron Piedra	Ecuador	3:37.88	3:45.17	3:45.57	
3	4	Demma Daba	Ethiopia	3:35.27	3:35.27	3:37.78	
3	5	Arturo Casado	Spain	3:33.14	3:33.14	3:36.42	Q
3	6	Lopez Lomong	United States	3:36.36	3:36.36	3:36.70	Q
3	7	Abdalaati Iguider	Morocco	3:31.88	3:31.88	3:36.48	Q
3	8	Andrew Baddeley	Great Britain	3:34.36	3:34.36	3:36.47	Q
3	9	Juan van Deventer	South Africa	3:34.46	3:34.46	3:36.32	Q
3	10	Nicholas Kemboi	Kenya	3:33.72	3:35.25	3:41.56	
3	11	Tiidrek Nurme	Estonia	3:38.59	3:38.59	3:38.59	PB, NR
3	12	Belal Mansoor Ali	Bahrain	3:31.49	3:33.12	3:36.84	q
3	13	Abdalla Abdelgadir	Sudan	3:38.93	3:38.93	3:47.65	
4	1	Mulugeta Wendimu	Ethiopia	3:31.13	3:34.67	3:36.67	q
4	2	Kamal Thamer Ali	Qatar	3:35.56	3:35.56	3:41.08	
4	3	Rashid Ramzi	Bahrain	3:29.14	3:32.89	~~3:32.89~~	Q, DPG
4	4	Mohamed Moustaoui	Morocco	3:32.06	3:32.06	3:34.80	Q
4	5	Kevin Sullivan	Canada	3:31.71	3:35.78	3:36.05	Q
4	6	Christian Obrist	Italy	3:35.32	3:35.91	3:35.91	Q, SB
4	7	Carsten Schlangen	Germany	3:34.99	3:34.99	3:36.34	q
4	8	Chauncy Master	Malawi	3:42.73	3:42.73	3:44.96	
4	9	Augustine Kiprono Choge	Kenya	3:31.57	3:31.57	3:35.47	Q
4	10	Mahamoud Farah	Djibouti	3:39.29	3:39.29	3:43.62	
4	11	Kamel Boulahfane	Algeria	3:32.44	3:33.33	3:45.59	
4	12	Jeffrey Riseley	Australia	3:36.03	3:36.03	3:53.95	

=== Semifinals ===
Qual. rule: first 5 of each heat (Q) plus the 2 fastest times (q) qualified.

==== Semifinal 1 ====
The first semifinal was held on 17 August 2008 at 21:55.

Rank	Athlete	Nation	Time	Notes
1	Asbel Kiprop	Kenya	3:37.04	Q
2	Abdalaati Iguider	Morocco	3:37.21	Q
3	Juan Carlos Higuero	Spain	3:37.31	Q
4	Christian Obrist	Italy	3:37.47	Q
5	Belal Mansoor Ali	Bahrain	3:37.60	Q
6	Juan van Deventer	South Africa	3:37.75	q
7	Daham Najim Bashir	Qatar	3:37.77	q
8	Carsten Schlangen	Germany	3:37.94	
9	Nathan Brannen	Canada	3:39.10	
10	Mulugeta Wendimu	Ethiopia	3:40.16	
11	Antar Zerguelaine	Algeria	3:40.64	
12	Lopez Lomong	United States	3:41.00	

==== Semifinal 2 ====
The second semifinal was held on 17 August 2008 at 22:04.

Rank	Athlete	Nation	Time	Notes
~~1~~	Rashid Ramzi	Bahrain	~~3:37.11~~	Q, DPG
2	Mehdi Baala	France	3:37.47	Q
3	Andrew Baddeley	Great Britain	3:37.47	Q
4	Augustine Kiprono Choge	Kenya	3:37.54	Q
5	Nicholas Willis	New Zealand	3:37.54	Q
6	Bernard Lagat	United States	3:37.79	
7	Deresse Mekonnen	Ethiopia	3:37.85	
8	Tarek Boukensa	Algeria	3:39.73	
9	Kevin Sullivan	Canada	3:40.30	
10	Mohamed Moustaoui	Morocco	3:40.90	
11	Arturo Casado	Spain	3:41.57	
12	Leonel Manzano	United States	3:50.33	

=== Final ===
The final was held on 19 August 2008 at 22:50.

Rank	Athlete	Nation	Time	Notes
1st place, gold medalist(s)	Asbel Kiprop	Kenya	3:33.11	
2nd place, silver medalist(s)	Nicholas Willis	New Zealand	3:34.16	
3rd place, bronze medalist(s)	Mehdi Baala	France	3:34.21	
4	Juan Carlos Higuero	Spain	3:34.44	
5	Abdalaati Iguider	Morocco	3:34.66	
6	Juan van Deventer	South Africa	3:34.77	
7	Belal Mansoor Ali	Bahrain	3:35.23	
8	Andrew Baddeley	Great Britain	3:35.37	
9	Augustine Kiprono Choge	Kenya	3:35.50	
10	Daham Najim Bashir	Qatar	3:37.68	
11	Christian Obrist	Italy	3:39.87	
DQ	Rashid Ramzi	Bahrain	~~3:32.94~~	DPG

Splits

Intermediate	Athlete	Nation	Mark
400 m	Asbel Kiprop	Kenya	56.48
800 m	Augustine Kiprono Choge	Kenya	1:56.06
1200 m	Augustine Kiprono Choge	Kenya	2:53.67
