= Sajjad Moradi =

Iranian middle-distance runner

Personal information
- Nationality: Iranian
- Born: March 30, 1983 (age 43) Lordegan, Iran
- Height: 183 cm (6 ft 0 in)
- Weight: 68 kg (150 lb)

Sport
- Sport: Track
- Events: 800 metres, 1500 metres

Achievements and titles
- Personal bests: 800 metres: 1:44.74 NR; 1500 metres: 3:37.09 NR
Medal record
Men's athletics
Representing Iran
Asian Games
Gold medal – first place	2010 Guangzhou	800 m
Silver medal – second place	2010 Guangzhou	1500 m
Asian Championships
Gold medal – first place	2009 Guangzhou	800 m
Silver medal – second place	2007 Amman	800 m
Silver medal – second place	2007 Amman	1500 m
Silver medal – second place	2011 Kobe	800 m
Silver medal – second place	2011 Kobe	1500 m
Bronze medal – third place	2005 Incheon	800 m
Asian Indoor Games
Gold medal – first place	2009 Hanoi	800 m
Bronze medal – third place	2007 Macau	4×400 m relay
Asian Indoor Championships
Silver medal – second place	2004 Tehran	800 m
Silver medal – second place	2004 Tehran	1500 m
Universiade
Gold medal – first place	2009 Belgrade	800 m

Sajjad Moradi (Persian: سجاد مرادی; born 30 March 1983) is an Iranian middle distance runner who specializes in the 800 m and 1500 m. He holds multiple national records for Iran from various track disciplines. Moradi is a gold-medalist in the Asian Games, Asian Athletics Championships, Asian Indoor Games, and Universiade. He also competed at three Summer Olympic Games in 2004, 2008, and 2012.

== Biography ==
He was born in Lordegan. Sajjad is the older brother of Amir Moradi (born 1990), who is also an elite track athlete specializing in the 800 and 1500 metres.

== Running career ==
=== 2004 Summer Olympics ===
Barely 21 years old, Moradi ran sixth heat at the men's 800 metres at the 2004 Summer Olympics with a time of 1:49.10, exiting in the first round. In his heat, Moradi lost out to older and more experienced Ivan Heshko and Amine Laâlou.

=== 2008 Summer Olympics ===
Moradi ran both the men's 800 metres at the 2008 Summer Olympics in Beijing and the men's 1500 metres of the same competition. For the 800, he narrowly missed qualification for the final 800, running a 1:46.08 just one place behind the last finals qualifier.

=== 2012 Summer Olympics ===
Moradi ran the men's 800 metres at the 2012 Summer Olympics in London. He ran fifth heat of the race and ran a time of 1:48.23, qualifying for the next round. In the semifinal, however, he got disqualified for a lane violation.

== Achievements ==
Year	Competition	Venue	Position	Event	Notes
2001	Asian Junior Championships	Bandar Seri Begawan, Brunei	6th	800 m	1:53.21
2002	Asian Championships	Colombo, Sri Lanka	7th	800 m	1:51.72
2002	Asian Games	Busan, South Korea	11th	1500 m	3:50.25
2002	Asian Junior Championships	Bangkok, Thailand	2nd	800 m	1:48.30
2002	Asian Junior Championships	Bangkok, Thailand	3rd	1500 m	3:54.22
2003	Asian Championships	Manila, Philippines	4th	800 m	1:47.38
2004	Asian Indoor Championships	Tehran, Iran	2nd	800 m	1:48.48
2004	Asian Indoor Championships	Tehran, Iran	2nd	1500 m	3:56.00
2004	World Indoor Championships	Budapest, Hungary	21st (h)	800 m	1:50.06
2004	Olympic Games	Athens, Greece	61st (h)	800 m	1:49.49
2005	World Championships	Helsinki, Finland	14th (h)	800 m	1:45.88
2005	Asian Championships	Incheon, South Korea	3rd	800 m	1:44.74
2005	Asian Championships	Incheon, South Korea	4th	4 × 400 m relay	3:08.75
2006	World Indoor Championships	Moscow, Russia	24th (h)	800 m	1:51.67
2006	Asian Games	Doha, Qatar	12th	1500 m	DNF
2007	Asian Championships	Amman, Jordan	2nd	800 m	1:52.22
2007	Asian Championships	Amman, Jordan	2nd	1500 m	3:47.01
2007	Asian Championships	Amman, Jordan	4th	4 × 400 m relay	3:08.64
2007	Asian Indoor Games	Macau	1st	800 m	DNF
2007	Asian Indoor Games	Macau	1st	1500 m	DNF
2007	World Championships	Osaka, Japan	36th (h)	800 m	1:46.75
2007	World Championships	Osaka, Japan	21st (sf)	1500 m	3:46.21
2008	Olympic Games	Beijing, China	9th (sf)	800 m	1:46.08
2009	Universiade	Belgrade, Serbia	1st	800 m	1:48.02
2009	Universiade	Belgrade, Serbia	–	1500 m	DNF
2009	World Championships	Berlin, Germany	23rd (h)	800 m	1:47.68
2009	Asian Indoor Games	Hanoi, Vietnam	1st	800 m	1:48.48
2009	Asian Championships	Guangzhou, China	1st	800 m	1:48.58
2009	Asian Championships	Guangzhou, China	–	1500 m	DNF
2010	West Asian Championships	Aleppo, Syria	2nd	800 m	1:45.76
2010	West Asian Championships	Aleppo, Syria	2nd	1500 m	3:40.31
2010	West Asian Championships	Aleppo, Syria	3rd	4 × 400 m relay	3:07.87
2010	Asian Games	Guangzhou, China	1st	800 m	1:45.45
2010	Asian Games	Guangzhou, China	2nd	1500 m	3:37.09
2011	Asian Championships	Kobe, Japan	2nd	800 m	1:46.35
2011	Asian Championships	Kobe, Japan	2nd	1500 m	3:43.30
2011	Universiade	Shenzhen, China	11th (h)	800 m	1:48.10
2011	Universiade	Shenzhen, China	–	1500 m	DNF
2011	World Championships	Daegu, South Korea	14th (sf)	800 m	1:46.17
2012	Olympic Games	London, United Kingdom	33rd (h)	800 m	1:48.23
2013	Asian Championships	Pune, India	8th	800 m	1:56.09
2013	Asian Championships	Pune, India	4th	1500 m	3:41.60
2013	Islamic Solidarity Games	Palembang, Indonesia	10th (h)	800 m	1:50.07
2013	Islamic Solidarity Games	Palembang, Indonesia	8th	1500 m	3:45.31
