= Athletics at the 2002 Asian Games – Men's 1500 metres =

Men's 1500 metres at the 2002 Asian Games
- Venue: Busan Asiad Main Stadium
- Dates: 12 October 2002
- Competitors: 17 from 11 nations

Medalists
gold medal	Rashid Ramzi	Bahrain
silver medal	Dou Zhaobo	China
bronze medal	Li Huiquan	China

The men's 1500 metres competition at the 2002 Asian Games in Busan, South Korea was held on 12 October at the Busan Asiad Main Stadium.

== Schedule ==
All times are Korea Standard Time (UTC+09:00)

Date	Time	Event
Saturday, 12 October 2002	14:00	Final

== Records ==
Prior to this competition, the existing world, Asian and Games records were as follows.

World Record	Hicham El-Guerrouj (MAR)	3:26.00	Rome, Italy	14 July 1998
Asian Record	Mohamed Suleiman (QAT)	3.32.10	Zurich, Switzerland	13 August 1997
Games Record	Mohamed Suleiman (QAT)	3.40.00	Hiroshima, Japan	16 October 1994

== Results ==
Legend

- DNF — Did not finish

Rank	Athlete	Time	Notes
1st place, gold medalist(s)	Rashid Ramzi (BRN)	3:47.33	
2nd place, silver medalist(s)	Dou Zhaobo (CHN)	3:48.51	
3rd place, bronze medalist(s)	Li Huiquan (CHN)	3:48.55	
4	Abdulrahman Suleiman (QAT)	3:48.62	
5	Kazuyoshi Tokumoto (JPN)	3:49.15	
6	Fumikazu Kobayashi (JPN)	3:49.18	
7	Kuldeep Kumar (IND)	3:49.37	
8	Abdulkabeer Loraibi (BRN)	3:49.45	
9	Mikhail Kolganov (KAZ)	3:49.64	
10	Jamal Yousuf Noor (QAT)	3:49.86	
11	Sajjad Moradi (IRI)	3:50.25	
12	Lee Du-haeng (KOR)	3:50.73	
13	Bashar Al-Kufrini (JOR)	3:51.47	
14	Kim Soon-hyung (KOR)	3:51.47	
15	Erkinjon Isakov (UZB)	3:52.06	
16	Othman Yousef (KSA)	3:52.19	
—	Mehdi Jelodarzadeh (IRI)	DNF	
