= Mitchell Kealey =

Australian middle-distance runner

Personal information
- Nationality: Australia
- Born: 28 January 1984 (age 42) Brisbane, Queensland, Australia
- Height: 1.78 m (5 ft 10 in)
- Weight: 62 kg (137 lb)

Sport
- Sport: Athletics
- Event: Middle distance running
- College team: University of Queensland
- Coached by: Roy Rankin

Achievements and titles
- Personal bests: 800 m: 1:48.39 (2009); 1500 m: 3:36.00 (2010)

Mitchell Kealey (born 28 January 1984) is an Australian middle-distance runner. He set his personal best time of 3:36.00, by placing third at the 2010 Sydney Athletics Grand Prix in Sydney, New South Wales. Kealey is also a member of the track and field team, and a graduate of business management at the University of Queensland in Brisbane.

Kealey qualified for the men's 1500 metres at the 2008 Summer Olympics in Beijing, after recorded an A-standard time of 3:36.21 in the same distance at the IAAF Golden League Meeting in Oslo, Norway. He ran in the second heat against twelve other athletes, including Kenya's Asbel Kipruto Kiprop and United States' Bernard Lagat, who both considered top medal contenders in this event. He finished the race in eleventh place by five seconds ahead of Swaziland's Isaiah Msibi, with a time of 3:46.31. Kealey, however, failed to advance into the semi-finals, as he placed forty-fifth overall, and was ranked farther below five mandatory slots for the next round.
