= 2013 Asian Athletics Championships – Men's 5000 metres =

Athletics event

The men's 5000 metres at the 2013 Asian Athletics Championships was held at the Shree Shiv Chhatrapati Sports Complex on 7 July.

== Results ==
Rank	Name	Nationality	Time	Notes
1st place, gold medalist(s)	Dejenee Regassa	Bahrain	13:53.25	
2nd place, silver medalist(s)	Alemu Bekele	Bahrain	13:57.23	
3rd place, bronze medalist(s)	Emad Noor	Saudi Arabia	14:05.88	
4	Govindan Lakshmanan	India	14:17.01	
5	Nitender Singh	India	14:19.43	
6	Satoru Kitamura	Japan	14:22.57	
7	Mohd Yunus	India	14:32.32	
8	Sanchai Namkhet	Thailand	15:14.11	
9	Kalyan Baniya	Nepal	15:58.19	
10	Hem Bunting	Cambodia	16:36.49	
	Ahmad Foroud	Iran	DNF	
	Nabil Al-Garbi	Yemen	DNS	
	Emad Mahdi Abdullah	Yemen	DNS	
