= Leandro de Oliveira =

Brazilian middle-distance runner (1982–2021)

Personal information
- Full name: Leandro Prates de Oliveira
- Born: 2 February 1982 Vitória da Conquista, Bahia, Brazil
- Died: July 6, 2021 (aged 39) São Paulo, Brazil

Sport
- Sport: Track and field
- Event: Middle-distance running
Medal record
Men's athletics
Representing Brazil
Pan American Games
Gold medal – first place	2011 Guadalajara	1500 m
South American Championships
Gold medal – first place	2011 Buenos Aires	1500 m
- Updated on 30 January 2015

Leandro Prates de Oliveira (2 February 1982 – 6 July 2021) was a Brazilian track and field athlete who specialised in the 1500 metres. He won gold medals in the event at the 2011 South American Championships in Athletics and the 2011 Pan American Games.

Oliveira was born in Vitória da Conquista, Bahia. He started competing at national level in 2006 and that year he came third over 1500 m at the Brazilian championships and set a personal best of 3:42.62 minutes. The following year he won his first international medal at the 2007 South American Championships in Athletics, where he was the 1500 m silver medallist behind Byron Piedra. He ran in both the 800 metres and 1500 m events at the 2007 Summer Universiade, but did not progress beyond the preliminary races. He did not compete internationally in 2008 and 2009, but improved his 1500 m best to 3:40.07 minutes in this period.

At the 2010 Ibero-American Championships he won the 1500 m bronze medal before taking the 3000 metres title. He represented Brazil at the 2011 IAAF World Cross Country Championships and placed 73rd in the longer 12 km race. He established himself as one of South America's best middle-distance runners on the track later that year. First he won the South American Road Championship over the mile and then he beat his compatriot Hudson de Souza to the 1500 m title at the 2011 South American Championships in Athletics. After winning the Brazilian title in the event, he was selected for the 2011 Pan American Games. In a highly tactical final, he edged Ecuador's Byron Piedra at the line to claim the gold medal.

== Personal bests ==
Event	Result	Venue	Date
800 m	1:49.10 min	São Paulo	20 May 2012
1500 m	3:40.07 min	Avellino	11 June 2008
3000 m	7:51.08 min	Belém	19 May 2010
5000 m	14:06.14 min	São Paulo	7 August 2011
3000 m steeplechase	8:52.18 min	São Paulo	1 August 2014

== Competition record ==
Year	Competition	Venue	Position	Event	Notes
Representing Brazil
2004	South American U23 Championships	Barquisimeto, Venezuela	5th	10,000m	31:50.42
2006	South American Road Mile Championships	Belém, Brazil	1st	One mile	3:56
2007	South American Championships	São Paulo, Brazil	2nd	1500m	3:43.26
2007	Universiade	Bangkok, Thailand	37th (h)	800m	1:51.63
2007	Universiade	Bangkok, Thailand	20th	1500m	3:48.10
2008	South American Road Mile Championships	Belém, Brazil	2nd	One mile	4:05
2010	South American Road Mile Championships	Belém, Brazil	2nd	One mile	4:05
2010	Ibero-American Championships	San Fernando, Spain	3rd	1500m	10.44 (wind: -0.2 m/s)
2010	Ibero-American Championships	San Fernando, Spain	1st	3000m	8:15.55
2011	World Cross Country Championships	Punta Umbría, Spain	73rd	12 km	37:10
2011	World Cross Country Championships	Punta Umbría, Spain	17th	Team - 12 km	326 pts
2011	South American Road Mile Championships	Belém, Brazil	1st	One mile	4:05
2011	South American Championships	Buenos Aires, Argentina	1st	1500m	3:45.55
2011	Pan American Games	Guadalajara, Mexico	18th (sf)	200m	3:53.44 A
2012	Ibero-American Championships	Barquisimeto, Venezuela	1st	1500m	3:47.76
2013	South American Road Mile Championships	Belém, Brazil	1st	One mile	4:04
2014	Ibero-American Championships	São Paulo, Brazil	6th	3000m steeplechase	8:52.18
2014	South American Road Mile Championships	Belém, Brazil	1st	One mile	4:04
