= Fumikazu Kobayashi =

Japanese middle-distance runner

Medal record

Men's athletics

Representing Japan

Asian Championships
Bronze medal – third place	2003 Manila	1500 m

Fumikazu Kobayashi (小林 史和, Kobayashi Fumikazu; born 21 March 1978) is a Japanese athlete who competes primarily in the 1500 metres. He competed at 2005 and 2007 World Championships reaching the semifinals stage the second time. He holds national records at several distances.

== Competition record ==
Year	Competition	Venue	Position	Event	Notes
Representing Japan
2002	Asian Games	Busan, South Korea	6th	1500 m	3:49.18
2003	Asian Championships	Manila, Philippines	3rd	1500 m	3:42.96
2005	World Championships	Helsinki, Finland	36th (h)	1500 m	3:51.76
2006	Asian Games	Doha, Qatar	5th	1500 m	3:42.45
2007	Asian Championships	Amman, Jordan	10th	1500 m	3:58.25
2007	World Championships	Osaka, Japan	18th (sf)	1500 m	3:43.64
2008	Asian Indoor Championships	Doha, Qatar	4th	1500 m	3:49.77
2009	Asian Championships	Guangzhou, China	13th (h)	1500 m	3:50.93

== Personal bests ==
Outdoor

- 800 metres – 1:50.35 (Tajimi 2010)
- 1000 metres – 2:19.65 (Abashiri 2005) NR
- 1500 metres – 3:37.42 (Heusden-Zolder 2004) NR
- One mile – 3:59.06 (Amagasaki 2002)
- 2000 metres – 5:07.24 (Kortrijk 2006) NR
- 5000 metres – 13:53.90 (Kanazawa 2001)
- 10,000 metres – 28:47.66 (Yokohama 2001)
- Half marathon – 1:04:53 (Inuyama 2001)

Indoor

- 1500 metres – 3:49.77 (Doha 2008)
- One mile – 4:04.76 (Boston 2005) NR
