= Athletics at the 2011 Pan American Games – Men's 1500 metres =

Men's 1500 metres at the 2011 Pan American Games
- Venue: Telmex Athletics Stadium
- Dates: October 26
- Competitors: 14 from 9 nations

Medalists
Gold medal	Leandro de Oliveira	Brazil
Silver medal	Byron Piedra	Ecuador
Bronze medal	Eduar Villanueva	Venezuela

The men's 1500 metres sprint competition of the athletics events at the 2011 Pan American Games took place on the 26th of October at the Telmex Athletics Stadium. The defending Pan American Games champion was Hudson de Souza of Brazil.

== Records ==
Prior to this competition, the existing world and Pan American Games records were as follows:

World record	Hicham El Guerrouj (MAR)	3:26.00	Rome, Italy	July 14, 1998
Pan American Games record	Hudson de Souza (BRA)	3:36.32	Rio de Janeiro, Brazil	July 25, 2007

== Qualification ==
Each National Olympic Committee (NOC) was able to enter one athlete regardless if they had met the qualification standard. To enter two entrants both athletes had to have met the minimum standard (3:48.0) in the qualifying period (January 1, 2010 to September 14, 2011).

== Schedule ==
Date	Time	Round
October 26, 2011	16:10	Final

== Results ==
All times shown are in seconds.

KEY:	q	Fastest non-qualifiers	Q	Qualified	NR	National record	PB	Personal best	SB	Seasonal best	DQ	Disqualified

=== Final ===
Held on October 26.

Rank	Name	Nationality	Time	Notes
1st place, gold medalist(s)	Leandro de Oliveira	Brazil	3:53.44	
2nd place, silver medalist(s)	Byron Piedra	Ecuador	3:53.45	
3rd place, bronze medalist(s)	Eduar Villanueva	Venezuela	3:54.06	
4	Jon Rankin	Cayman Islands	3:54.79	
5	Andrew Acosta	United States	3:55.27	
6	Javier Carriqueo	Argentina	3:55.52	
7	Nico Herrera	Venezuela	3:56.30	
8	Iván López	Chile	3:56.53	
9	Samuel Vazquez	Puerto Rico	3:56.65	
10	Leslie Encina	Chile	3:56.69	
11	Jose Esparza	Mexico	3:56.94	
12	Diego Borrego	Mexico	4:00.03	
13	Federico Bruno	Argentina	4:01.09	
14	Will Leer	United States	4:04.13	
