= Saif Saaeed Shaheen =

Qatari-Kenyan long-distance runner

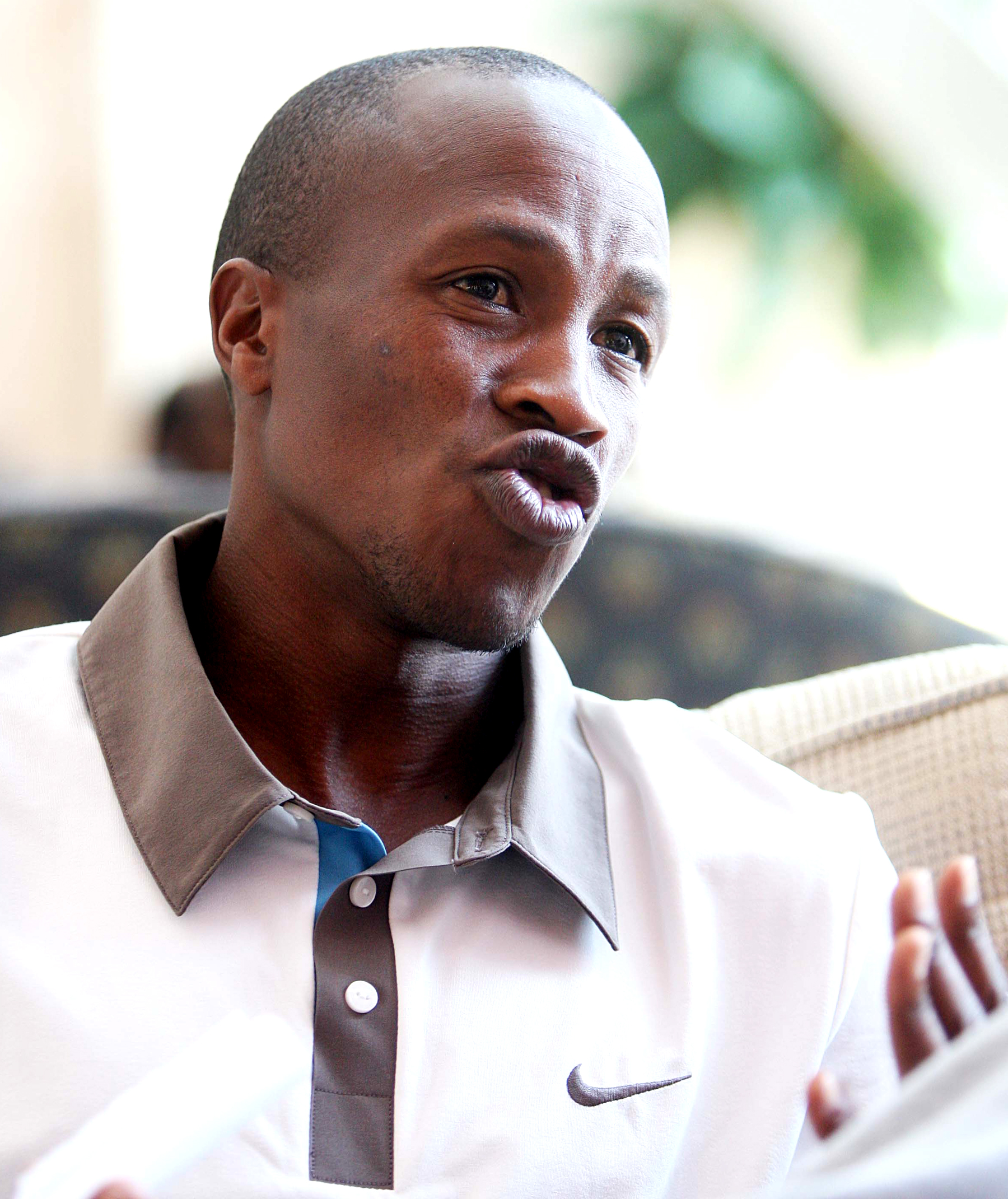
- Shaheen in 2009

Personal information
- Citizenship: Qatari (from August 2003); Kenyan (Until August 2003)
- Born: Stephen Cheruiyot Cherono; 15 October 1982 (age 43) Kamelilo Village, Iron Location, Keiyo District, Rift Valley Province, Kenya
- Height: 174 cm (5 ft 8 1/2 in)
- Weight: 60 kg (130 lb)
- Spouse: Monica Kangogo

Sport
- Sport: Athletics
- Events: 3000 m steeplechase 3000 m 5000 m Cross country
- Retired: 2016
Medal record
Men's athletics
Representing Qatar
World Championships
Gold medal – first place	2003 Paris	3000 m st.
Gold medal – first place	2005 Helsinki	3000 m st.
World Indoor Championships
Silver medal – second place	2006 Moscow	3000 m
Asian Championships
Silver medal – second place	2003 Manila	1500 m
Silver medal – second place	2003 Manila	5000 m
Asian Indoor Championships
Gold medal – first place	2006 Pattaya	3000 m
Representing Kenya
African Championships
Bronze medal – third place	2002 Radès	3000 m st.
Commonwealth Games
Gold medal – first place	2002 Manchester	3000 m st.
World Youth Championships
Gold medal – first place	1999 Bydgoszcz	2000 m st.
- Updated on 4 May 2018

Saif Saaeed Shaheen (Arabic: سيف سعيد شاهين), formerly Stephen Cherono (born 15 October 1982), is a retired steeplechase runner. Born in Keiyo, Kenya he represented Qatar. He was, for 19 years, the world record holder for 3000 metre steeplechase. He is a two time World Champion in the event. His older brother Abraham Cherono is also a steeplechase runner.

He was the 1999 World Youth Champion in the steeplechase and set a world junior record two years later. He won the steeplechase at the 2002 Commonwealth Games for Kenya but switched allegiance to Qatar in 2003. That year he became world champion in the event, although a dispute with the Kenyan Athletics Federation meant he was ineligible to compete at the 2004 Summer Olympics. He set a world record of 7:53.63 minutes in Brussels just ten days after the Olympic final, and later defeated that year's Olympic champion, Ezekiel Kemboi, at the 2004 World Athletics Final in Monaco.

In the 2006 season he took the 3000 metres silver medal at the 2006 IAAF World Indoor Championships and also set a number of Asian records. He completed a 5000 m/steeplechase double at the 2006 IAAF World Cup. Serious injuries ruled him out from late 2006 to 2008. He returned in 2009 and 2010 but failed to reach the same level of performance and retired from the sport.

== Early competition for Kenya ==
Stephen Cheruiyot Cherono was born and raised in Kenya, showing athletic ability from a young age. He initially made his mark on the international stage with a win at the 1999 World Youth Championships in Athletics over the 2000 metre steeplechase. After the death of his coach and manager Kim McDonald in 2001, he started training under Italian coach Renato Canova, who was already the coach of his elder brother Christopher Kosgei. Christopher was the 3000 metre SC World Champion in 1999. The first success of this collaboration was breaking the World Junior Record in Brussels in 2001. As of May, 2017 his time of 7:58.66 was still the WJR. He then went on to win the 3000 metre SC in both the 2003 and 2005.

He then decided to try the 5000 metres. At the 2003 Golden Spike, in Ostrava, Czech Republic, he ran 12:48.81. He won the race and defeated previous World Champion Hicham El Guerrouj by nearly a second and a half. At the time, it was the 7th fastest time ever run (with only Haile Gebrselassie and Daniel Komen running faster times) and he is still one of only 30 men who have ever run under 12:50 for 5000 metres.

== Move to Qatar ==
Cherono moved from Kenya to Qatar in 2003, along with fellow Kenyan Albert Chepkurui. Changing his name from Stephen Cherono to Saif Saaeed Shaheen, he was reported to have received up to US$1 million to become a Qatari citizen, although he denied this. Some reports stated that he had been given US$1,000 every month for the rest of his life for his change of nationality. After about 40 athletes had left the country, President Mwai Kibaki made a speech before the 2005 World Championships in which he said "Let us resist the temptation to change our citizenship for financial gains."

Shaheen began his international career for Qatar by winning two medals at the 2003 Asian Athletics Championships, taking silvers over 1500 m and 5000 m. When he won the steeplechase at the 2003 World Championships in Athletics in Paris, his brother, who was also in the race, walked off the track and did not congratulate him due to his defection to Qatar.

Shaheen was barred from competing in the 2004 Olympic Games due to an International Olympic Committee (IOC) rule that athletes may not compete in international events for three years after competing in an international event for a different country. This rule may be waived if the athlete and the governing athletics bodies from the two countries involved agree that it should be; Athletics Kenya did not agree. Kenyan runner Ezekiel Kemboi won the Olympic steeplechase race that year.

Shaheen's move is a prominent example of increasing globalization in athletics, as countries such as Qatar and Bahrain, also a Persian Gulf State, have persuaded high-profile African athletes to change nationalities. This marked a change of motivation in athlete transfers, in contrast, for example, to the politically motivated change of Zola Budd, or the marriage and emigration issues that led Wilson Kipketer to compete for Denmark. IOC President Jacques Rogge has also raised concerns about athletes moving between countries, stating that, "What is bad is countries or organizations wanting to buy athletes just for the money."

Sympathy has been expressed for Shaheen's move, with the former 3,000 metre steeplechase world record holder, Kenyan Moses Kiptanui, stating "We have seen a lot of athletes who were running in the 1968 Olympics or 1974 until maybe last year, some of them, they are living in a very, very sparse state. They are very poor despite the fact they have done great things for this country".

== Competing for Qatar ==
He was eighth in the long race and fourth in the short race at the 2005 IAAF World Cross Country Championships, leading Qatar to the team bronze on both occasions. On the track later that year he became the steeplechase world champion with a win at the 2005 World Championships in Athletics, defeating his Kenyan rivals Kemboi and Kipruto. He began the following year by running an Asian indoor record to win the 3000 metres gold medal at the 2006 Asian Indoor Athletics Championships. Moving on to the global stage, he ran in the event at the 2006 IAAF World Indoor Championships and took the silver medal, losing to Kenenisa Bekele by two seconds. This was his first global indoor medal but he was not happy with his race tactics: "That was not very intelligent of me. I knew exactly when Kenenisa would start his kick and I planned to be close to him at that time. But I wasn't."

In the outdoor season he took two wins on the 2006 IAAF Golden League, taking the steeplechase races at the Weltklasse Zurich and Memorial van Damme meetings. He was selected to represent Asia at the 2006 IAAF World Cup and completed a double by taking the 5000 m title and then setting a championship record to win in his steeplechase speciality. Shaheen was the first runner to medal in both events at the same competition, let alone win the double.

His successful season came at a price as, after ignoring doctor's orders, the tendinitis in his patella worsened and an Achilles tendon injury doubled his health difficulties. As a result, he missed a number of major competitions, including the 2006 Asian Games, the 2007 World Championships in Athletics and the 2008 Beijing Olympics. He began finding it difficult to walk for long periods and underwent treatment with renowned sports injury specialist Hans-Wilhelm Müller-Wohlfahrt. A possible comeback in 2008 turned out to be a write-off as he pulled up in pain in circuit races in Athens and Eugene, Oregon.

He came back into competition in early 2009. He won the Cinque Mulini race and set his sights upon the 2009 IAAF World Cross Country Championships. Although not at his best, his thirteenth-place finish at the competition to head the Qatari team to fifth in the rankings marked his return to the top level. When he returned to the track he set a personal best in the 3000 metres at the Qatar Athletic Super Grand Prix, running 7:32.46 for fourth place. At the 2009 World Championships in Athletics, however, he was far from the form which brought him a world record. He finished eleventh in his 5000 m heat and was eliminated in the first round.

He competed in his first elite road race in 2010, running at the Belgrade Race Through History. He finished the difficult 6 km course in 16:57, which was enough for fourth place behind Stephen Tum. A runner-up finish followed at the Great South Run 10-miler followed two weeks later, where he was second only to Joseph Ebuya who recorded the fastest ever time in the United Kingdom.

== Retirement ==
He did not compete at top level after 2010 and Shaheen announced his formal retirement from international competition in February 2016, citing a long-term achilles tendon injury. Shaheen returned to live in Eldoret, Kenya to run a family business.

== International competitions ==
Year	Competition	Venue	Position	Event	Notes
1999	World Youth Championships	Bydgoszcz, Poland	1st	2000 m steeplechase	5:31.89
2001	Goodwill Games	Brisbane, Australia	1st	3000 m steeplechase	8:19.98
2001	Grand Prix Final	Melbourne, Australia	3rd	3000 m steeplechase	8:18.85
2002	Commonwealth Games	Manchester, United Kingdom	1st	3000 m steeplechase	8:19.41
2002	African Championships	Tunis, Tunisia	3rd	3000 m steeplechase	8:23.85
2003	European Champion Clubs Cup	Valencia, Spain	1st	5000 m	13:48.97
2003	European Champion Clubs Cup	Valencia, Spain	1st	3000 m steeplechase	8:16.44
2003	World Championships	Paris, France	1st	3000 m steeplechase	8:04.39
2003	World Athletics Final	Monte Carlo, Monaco	1st	3000 m steeplechase	7:57.38
2003	Asian Championships	Manila, Philippines	2nd	1500 m	3:42.79
2003	Asian Championships	Manila, Philippines	2nd	5000 m	13:58.92
2004	World Cross Country Championships	Brussels, Belgium	5th	Short race	11:44
2004	World Cross Country Championships	Brussels, Belgium	2nd	Team	39 pts
2004	World Military Cross Country Championships	Beirut, Lebanon	1st	Short race	13:04
2004	World Military Cross Country Championships	Beirut, Lebanon	1st	Team	
2004	European Champion Clubs Cup	Moscow, Russia	1st	5000 m	13:55.08
2004	European Champion Clubs Cup	Moscow, Russia	1st	3000 m steeplechase	8:33.75
2004	World Athletics Final	Monte Carlo, Monaco	1st	3000 m steeplechase	7:56.94
2005	World Cross Country Championships	Saint-Étienne, France	4th	Short race	11:42
2005	World Cross Country Championships	Saint-Étienne, France	3rd	Team	32 pts
2005	World Cross Country Championships	Saint-Étienne, France	8th	Senior race	35:53
2005	World Cross Country Championships	Saint-Étienne, France	3rd	Team	42 pts
2005	World Championships	Helsinki, Finland	1st	3000 m steeplechase	8:13.31
2006	Asian Indoor Championships	Pattaya, Thailand	1st	3000 m	7:39.77
2006	World Indoor Championships	Moscow, Russia	2nd	3000 m	7:41.28
2006	World Cross Country Championships	Fukuoka, Japan	9th	Short race	11:08
2006	World Cross Country Championships	Fukuoka, Japan	4th	Team	66 pts
2006	World Cup	Athens, Greece	1st	5000 m	13:35.30
2006	World Cup	Athens, Greece	1st	3000 m steeplechase	8:19.09
2009	World Cross Country Championships	Amman, Jordan	13th	Senior race	35:28
2009	World Championships	Berlin, Germany	11th (h)	5000 m	13:26.35

== National titles ==
- Kenyan Athletics Championships
  - 3000 m steeplechase: 2002

== Circuit wins ==
2000 m steeplechase

- Qatar Athletic Super Grand Prix: 2005

3000 m steeplechase

- Notturna di Milano: 2002
- Tsiklitiria: 2002, 2003, 2004, 2005, 2006
- Weltklasse Zürich: 2002, 2003, 2004, 2005, 2006
- Meeting Gaz de France: 2003
- DN Galan: 2003
- Memorial Van Damme: 2003, 2004, 2005, 2006
- Golden Spike Ostrava: 2004
- Golden Gala: 2005

3000 m

- BW-Bank Meeting: 2010

5000 m

- Golden Spike Ostrava: 2003

Cross country

- Cinque Mulini: 2005, 2009

== Personal bests ==
- 1500 metres – 3:33.51 (2006)
- 2000 metres – 5:03.06 (2001)
- 3000 metres – 7:32.46 (2009)
- Two miles – 8:18.80 (1999)
- 5000 metres – 12:48.81 (2003) NR
- 2000 metres steeplechase – 5:14.53 (2005) AR NR
- 3000 metres steeplechase – 7:53.63 (2004) WR WU23B AR NR
- 10 miles – 46:37 (2010)

Shaheen also holds the world under-20 record for the steeplechase at 7:58.66 minutes, set in 2001

== See also ==
- List of eligibility transfers in athletics
- List of World Championships in Athletics medalists (men)
- List of Commonwealth Games medallists in athletics (men)
- Kenya at the World Championships in Athletics
- List of Qatar-related topics

Records
Preceded by Brahim Boulami	Men's Steeplechase World Record Holder; 3 September 2004 —	Succeeded by Lamecha Girma
Sporting positions
Preceded by Salah Hissou	Men's 5000 m Best Year Performance; 2003	Succeeded by Kenenisa Bekele
Preceded by Brahim Boulami	Men's 3000 m Steeple Best Year Performance; 2003-2006	Succeeded by Paul Kipsiele Koech
