= 2005 Asian Athletics Championships – Men's 5000 metres =

The men's 5000 metres event at the 2005 Asian Athletics Championships was held in Incheon, South Korea on September 4.

== Results ==
Rank	Name	Nationality	Time	Notes
1st place, gold medalist(s)	James Kwalia	Qatar	14:08.56	
2nd place, silver medalist(s)	Daham Najim Bashir	Qatar	14:15.92	PB
3rd place, bronze medalist(s)	Wu Wen-Chien	Chinese Taipei	14:32.43	
4	Tomohiro Seto	Japan	14:32.77	
5	Srisung Boonthung	Thailand	14:32.85	
6	Takashi Maeda	Japan	14:33.18	
7	Denis Bagrev	Kyrgyzstan	14:34.69	
8	Ajmal Amirov	Tajikistan	14:43.29	SB
9	Huh Jang-Kyu	South Korea	14:46.55	
10	Eum Hyo-Suk	South Korea	14:55.61	
11	Kim Myong Jin	North Korea	15:08.61	PB
12	Sotyvoldy Khaitov	Tajikistan	15:22.41	PB
13	Hem Bunting	Cambodia	15:41.30	SB
14	Saysana Bannavong	Laos	15:43.39	PB
15	Calisto da Costa	Timor-Leste	16:28.17	PB
16	Ieong Chio Wa	Macau	16:50.51	PB
