= 2003 Asian Athletics Championships – Men's 1500 metres =

Middle distance running event

The men's 1500 metres event at the 2003 Asian Athletics Championships was held in Manila, Philippines on September 20–21.

== Medalists ==
Gold	Silver	Bronze
Rashid Ramzi; Bahrain	Saif Saaeed Shaheen; Qatar	Fumikazu Kobayashi; Japan

== Results ==
=== Heats ===
Rank	Heat	Name	Nationality	Time	Notes
1	2	Fumikazu Kobayashi	Japan	3:49.89	Q
2	2	Rashid Ramzi	Bahrain	3:50.07	Q
3	2	Abubaker Ali Kamal	Qatar	3:50.52	Q
4	2	Sunil Jayaweera	Sri Lanka	3:50.76	Q
5	2	Gulab Chand	India	3:50.84	Q
6	2	Chen Fu-Pin	Chinese Taipei	3:51.20	q
7	1	Saif Saaeed Shaheen	Qatar	3:51.68	Q
8	1	Chaminda Indika Wijekoon	Sri Lanka	3:52.00	Q
9	1	Kuldeep Kumar	India	3:52.06	Q
10	1	Kim Nam-Jin	South Korea	3:52.42	Q, SB
11	2	John Lozada	Philippines	3:52.49	q, SB
12	1	Atta Miran	Pakistan	3:53.10	Q
13	1	Rajendra Bahadur Bhandari	Nepal	3:53.61	PB
14	2	Denis Bagrev	Kyrgyzstan	3:54.12	SB
15	2	Ahmad Yazdanian	Iran	3:54.16	SB
16	1	Rene Herrera	Philippines	3:55.48	SB
17	2	Ajmal Amirov	Tajikistan	4:03.33	SB
18	1	Lourenco da Silva Breitas	Timor-Leste	4:47.75	PB

=== Final ===
Rank	Name	Nationality	Time	Notes
1st place, gold medalist(s)	Rashid Ramzi	Bahrain	3:41.66	
2nd place, silver medalist(s)	Saif Saaeed Shaheen	Qatar	3:42.79	
3rd place, bronze medalist(s)	Fumikazu Kobayashi	Japan	3:42.96	
4	Abubaker Ali Kamal	Qatar	3:46.62	
5	Gulab Chand	India	3:46.94	SB
6	Sunil Jayaweera	Sri Lanka	3:47.39	SB
7	Chen Fu-Pin	Chinese Taipei	3:47.54	NJR
8	Chaminda Indika Wijekoon	Sri Lanka	3:48.33	
9	Kuldeep Kumar	India	3:50.04	SB
10	Atta Miran	Pakistan	3:51.60	
11	Kim Nam-Jin	South Korea	3:59.13	
	John Lozada	Philippines	DNF	
