= 2003 Asian Athletics Championships – Men's 5000 metres =

The men's 5000 metres event at the 2003 Asian Athletics Championships was held in Manila, Philippines on September 23.

== Results ==
Rank	Name	Nationality	Time	Notes
1st place, gold medalist(s)	Abdulaziz Abdelrahman Al-Ameeri	Qatar	13:58.89	
2nd place, silver medalist(s)	Saif Saaeed Shaheen	Qatar	13:58.92	
3rd place, bronze medalist(s)	Nobuya Matsunaga	Japan	14:12.73	
4	Tatsumi Morimasa	Japan	14:22.73	
5	Kuldeep Kumar	India	14:34.77	PB
6	Gulab Chand	India	14:37.36	SB
7	Rajendra Bahadur Bhandari	Nepal	14:38.43	SB
8	Denis Bagrev	Kyrgyzstan	14:40.91	SB
9	Julius Sermona	Philippines	14:45.38	SB
10	Aung Thi Ha	Myanmar	14:58.39	
11	Jauhari Johan	Indonesia	14:59.95	SB
12	Ajmal Amirov	Tajikistan	15:29.97	
13	Abolfazi Mahmoudian	Iran	15:36.94	
