= South American Road Mile Championships =

Annual road running competition in South America

- Sport: Mile run
- Continent: South America (CONSUDATLE)

The South American Road Mile Championships (Spanish: Campeonatos Sudamericanos de Milla en Ruta, Portuguese: Campeonato Sul-Americano de Milha de Rua) is an annual road running competition over the distance of one mile organized by CONSUDATLE for athletes representing the countries of its member associations.

== Editions ==
Year	City	Country	Date
...			
2000	Rio de Janeiro	Brazil	November 26
2001	Rio de Janeiro	Brazil	April 15
2002	Belém, Pará	Brazil	May 3
2003	Belém, Pará	Brazil	May 2
2004	Belém, Pará	Brazil	May 20
2005	Belém, Pará	Brazil	May 20
2006	Belém, Pará	Brazil	May 19
2007	Belém, Pará	Brazil	May 18
2008	Belém, Pará	Brazil	May 23
2009	Belém, Pará	Brazil	May 22
2010	Belém, Pará	Brazil	May 28
2011	Belém, Pará	Brazil	May 13
2012	Belém, Pará	Brazil	May 4
2013	Belém, Pará	Brazil	May 10
2014	Belém, Pará	Brazil	August 8
2015		Brazil	June 19

== Results ==
The winners were published.

=== Men ===
Year	Gold		Silver		Bronze	
...						
2000	José Mauro Valente; Brazil	4:07	Willian Gomes de Amorim; Brazil	4:08	Celso Ficagna; Brazil	4:09
2001	Hudson Santos de Souza; Brazil	4:06	Ramiro Nogueira Filho; Brazil	4:09	Celso Ficagna; Brazil	4:09
2002	Hudson Santos de Souza; Brazil	4:01	Fabiano Peçanha; Brazil	4:03	Celso Ficagna; Brazil	4:04
2003	Hudson Santos de Souza; Brazil	4:11	Fabiano Peçanha; Brazil	4:12	Celso Ficagna; Brazil	4:14
2004^{1.)}	Fabiano Peçanha; Brazil	4:01	Celso Ficagna; Brazil	4:03	Jocemar Iláro Soares; Brazil	4:11
2005	Hudson Santos de Souza; Brazil	4:05	João Paulo Fernandes; Brazil	4:06	André Alberi de Santana; Brazil	4:08
2006^{2.)}	Leandro Prates de Oliveira; Brazil	3:56	Hudson Santos de Souza; Brazil	3:56	André Alberi de Santana; Brazil	4:06
2007	Fabiano Peçanha; Brazil	4:09	André Alberi de Santana; Brazil	4:10	Leslie Encina; Chile	4:11
2008	Hudson Santos de Souza; Brazil	4:03	Leandro Prates de Oliveira; Brazil	4:05	Byron Piedra; Ecuador	4:09
2009	Byron Piedra; Ecuador	3:57	Hudson Santos de Souza; Brazil	3:58	Mario Bazán; Peru	3:59
2010	Fabiano Peçanha; Brazil	4:05	Leandro Prates de Oliveira; Brazil	4:06	André Alberi de Santana; Brazil	4:07
2011	Leandro Prates de Oliveira; Brazil	4:05	André Alberi de Santana; Brazil	4:06	Mario Bazán; Peru	4:07
2012	Fabiano Peçanha; Brazil	3:59	Iván López; Chile	3:59	Federico Bruno; Argentina	4:00
2013	Leandro Prates de Oliveira; Brazil	4:04	Carlos Diaz; Chile	4:05	Lutimar Abreu Paes; Brazil	4:07
2014	Leandro Prates de Oliveira; Brazil	4:04	Marvin Blanco; Venezuela	4:06	André Alberi de Santana; Brazil	4:07

^{1.)}: In 2004, Sebastião Oliveira Silva from Brazil was 3rd in 4:10 min, running as guest.
^{2.)}: In 2006, Majed Saeed Sultan from Qatar was 3rd in 4:00 min, and Abdulrahman Suleiman also from Qatar was 4th in 4:04 min, both athletes running as guests.
