= Athletics at the 2002 Commonwealth Games – Men's 3000 metres steeplechase =

Men's 3000 metres steeplechase at the Commonwealth Games

The men's 3000 metres steeplechase event at the 2002 Commonwealth Games was held on 27 July.

== Results ==
Rank	Name	Nationality	Time	Notes
1st place, gold medalist(s)	Stephen Cherono	Kenya	8:19.41	
2nd place, silver medalist(s)	Ezekiel Kemboi	Kenya	8:19.78	
3rd place, bronze medalist(s)	Abraham Cherono	Kenya	8:19.85	
4	Stuart Stokes	England	8:26.45	PB
5	Joël Bourgeois	Canada	8:33.98	
6	Donald Naylor	Wales	8:38.68	PB
7	Benedict Whitby	England	8:40.87	
8	Christian Stephenson	Wales	8:41.32	SB
9	Patrick Davoren	England	8:44.43	
