= Hem Bunting =

Cambodian marathon runner

Medal record

Representing Cambodia

Athletics

Southeast Asian Games
Silver medal – second place	2007 Nakhon Ratchasima	Marathon
Bronze medal – third place	2007 Nakhon Ratchasima	5,000 m
Bronze medal – third place	2009 Vientiane	Marathon

Hem Bunting (Khmer: ហែម ប៊ុនទីង, born December 12, 1985) is a Cambodian marathoner.

Bunting is one of nine children from a family of farmers in Stung Treng Province. The British Broadcasting Corporation has described him as "so poor he lives in the crumbling athletics stadium where he trains". He won a silver medal in the marathon and a bronze at the 5,000 metre race at the 2007 Southeast Asian Games. He represented Cambodia in the marathon at the 2008 Summer Olympics in Beijing, finishing 73rd in a time of 2:33:32.

Bunting had few facilities and little funding to prepare for the Olympics. He trained by running laps on a track simultaneously used by casual joggers, and could not afford to buy running shoes. The BBC's article on him moved one reader to send him new training shoes prior to the Beijing Olympics.

He has made a significant effort in his second Marathon outing of 2012 after finishing in top 50 (42nd) at the Paris Marathon on April 15 with a personal best of 2:23:29. The time also improved on his previous national record 2:25:20 set during 2009 Southeast Asian Games in Vientiane where he won a bronze medal. Not only that, his official intermediate time at half marathon shows 1:09:04, which is a new national record.

== Competition record ==
Year	Competition	Venue	Position	Event	Notes
Representing Cambodia
2004	World Half Marathon Championships	New Delhi, India	79th	Half marathon	1:19:40 (NR)
2005	Asian Championships	Incheon, South Korea	20th	1500 m	4:03.87
2005	Asian Championships	Incheon, South Korea	13th	5000 m	15:41.30
2006	Asian Indoor Championships	Pattaya, Thailand	11th (h)	1500 m	4:06.10
2006	Asian Indoor Championships	Pattaya, Thailand	9th	3000 m	9:02.00
2006	Asian Games	Doha, Qatar	13th	5000 m	15:19.25
2007	World Championships	Osaka, Japan	39th (h)	1500 m	4:08.31
2007	Southeast Asian Games	Nakhon Ratchasima, Thailand	3rd	5000 m	14:24.71 (NR)
2008	Olympic Games	Beijing, China	73rd	Marathon	2:33:32
2009	World Championships	Berlin, Germany	39th (h)	1500 m	4:08.64
2009	Jeux de la Francophonie	Beirut, Lebanon	11th	5000 m	15:39.28
2009	Southeast Asian Games	Vientiane, Laos	6th	5000 m	15:45.63
2009	Southeast Asian Games	Vientiane, Laos	3rd	Marathon	2:25:19.68 (NR)
2010	Asian Games	Guangzhou, China	–	Marathon	DNF
2013	Asian Championships	Pune, India	10th	5000 m	16:36.49
2014	Asian Games	Incheon, South Korea	–	Marathon	DNF

== Personal bests ==
Outdoor

- 1500 m – 4:03.87 (Incheon 2005)
- 5000 m – 14:24.71 (Nakhon Ratchasema 2007)
- Half Marathon – 1:11:47 (Khon Kaen 2008)
- Marathon – 2:23:29 (Paris 2012)

Indoor

- 1500 m – 4:06.10 (Pattaya 2006)
- 3000 m – 9:02.00 (Pattaya 2006)
