= 2002 Asian Athletics Championships – Men's 1500 metres =

The men's 1500 metres event at the 2002 Asian Athletics Championships was held in Colombo, Sri Lanka on 10–11 August.

== Medalists ==
Gold	Silver	Bronze
Abdulrahman Suleiman; Qatar	Rashid Ramzi; Bahrain	Jamal Noor Youssef; Qatar

== Results ==
=== Heats ===
Rank	Heat	Name	Nationality	Time	Notes
1	1	Rashid Ramzi	Bahrain	3:59.51	Q
2	1	Jamal Noor Youssef	Qatar	3:59.51	Q
3	1	Terukazu Omori	Japan	3:59.51	Q
4	1	Sanje Tulasidharan	India	3:59.76	Q, PB
5	1	Chaminda Indika Wijekoon	Sri Lanka	4:00.02	q
6	1	Thilak Nishantha	Sri Lanka	4:00.60	q
7	2	Abdulrahman Suleiman	Qatar	4:11.43	Q
8	2	Tetsuya Kobayashi	Japan	4:11.87	Q
9	2	Kuldeep Kumar	India	4:12.17	Q
10	2	Mohamed Haidara	Bahrain	4:12.90	Q
11	2	H.K.S. Priyantha	Sri Lanka	4:14.64	q
12	2	Hussain Riyaz	Maldives	4:18.16	q
	1	Mikhail Kolganov	Kazakhstan	DNF	
	1	Nader Halawa	Palestine	DNF	
	2	Mehdi Jelodarzadeh	Iran	DNF	
	2	Lee Phongsanith	Laos	DNF	

=== Final ===
Rank	Name	Nationality	Time	Notes
1st place, gold medalist(s)	Abdulrahman Suleiman	Qatar	3:45.98	
2nd place, silver medalist(s)	Rashid Ramzi	Bahrain	3:46.41	
3rd place, bronze medalist(s)	Jamal Noor Youssef	Qatar	3:46.85	
4	Kuldeep Kumar	India	3:48.85	
5	Tetsuya Kobayashi	Japan	3:49.93	
6	Sanje Tulasidharan	India	3:51.46	
7	Chaminda Indika Wijekoon	Sri Lanka	3:52.33	
8	Thilak Nishantha	Sri Lanka	3:53.08	PB
9	Mohamed Haidara	Bahrain	3:55.02	PB
10	H.K.S. Priyantha	Sri Lanka	3:58.81	PB
11	Hussain Riyaz	Maldives	4:16.72	SB
	Terukazu Omori	Japan	DNS	
