= Kamal Boulahfane =

Algerian middle-distance runner

Kamal Boulahfane (born 1 July 1976) is an Algerian former runner, who specialized in the 1500 metres. He was born in Djimla.

== Competition record ==
Year	Competition	Venue	Position	Event	Notes
Representing Algeria
1999	World Cross Country Championships	Belfast, United Kingdom	20th	Short race	Individual
1999	World Cross Country Championships	Belfast, United Kingdom	5th	Short race	Team
2000	Olympic Games	Sydney, Australia	21st (sf)	1500 m	3:43.98
2001	World Indoor Championships	Lisbon, Portugal	21st (h)	1500 m	3:48.59
2004	Olympic Games	Athens, Greece	11th	1500 m	3:39.02
2004	World Athletics Final	Monte Carlo, Monaco	6th	1500 m	3:45.78
2004	Pan Arab Games	Algiers, Algeria	2nd	1500 m	3:46.36
2005	Mediterranean Games	Almería, Spain	6th	1500 m	3:46.10
2006	African Championships	Bambous, Mauritius	4th	1500 m	3:47.05
2006	World Athletics Final	Stuttgart, Germany	9th	1500 m	3:34.58
2007	World Championships	Osaka, Japan	32nd (h)	1500 m	3:43.88
2008	World Indoor Championships	Valencia, Spain	-	1500 m	DNF
2008	World Indoor Championships	Valencia, Spain	10th	3000 m	8:04.73
2008	Olympic Games	Beijing, China	42nd (h)	1500 m	3:47.05

=== Personal bests ===
- 800 metres - 1:46.07 min (2005)
- 1500 metres - 3:32.44 min (2004)
