= Stuart Stokes =

British athlete (born 1976)

Personal information
- Nationality: British (English)
- Born: 5 October 1976 (age 49) Bolton, England
- Height: 1.81 m (5 ft 11 in) (2012)
- Weight: 65 kg (143 lb) (2012)

Sport
- Event: Steeplechase
- Club: Sale Harriers
- Coached by: David Stokes

Stuart Bradley Stokes (born 5 October 1976) is a British former track and field athlete who competed at the 2012 Summer Olympics.

== Biography ==
Stokes competed in the 3000 metres steeplechase and was afull-time teacher.

He represented England at the 2002 Commonwealth Games in Manchester and represented the England team again at the 2006 Commonwealth Games in Melbourne. In between his two Commonwealth Games appearances he became the British 2,000 metres steeplechase champion after winning the British AAA Championships title at the 2003 AAA Championships.

At the 2012 Olympic Games in London, he represented Great Britain in the 3,000 metres steeplechase event, where he finished 35th.

== Competition record ==
| Year | Competition | Venue | Position | Event | Notes |
Representing Great Britain and England
| 1995 | European Junior Championships | Nyíregyháza, Hungary | 13th (h) | 3000 m s'chase | 9:12.46 |
| 2002 | Commonwealth Games | Manchester, United Kingdom | 4th | 3000 m s'chase | 8:26.45 |
| 2006 | Commonwealth Games | Melbourne, Australia | 5th | 3000 m s'chase | 8:29.94 |
| 2010 | Commonwealth Games | Delhi, India | 5th | 3000 m s'chase | 8:32.24 |
| 2012 | Olympic Games | London, United Kingdom | 35th (h) | 3000 m s'chase | 8:43.04 |
