= Ajmal Amirov =

Tajikistani middle-distance runner

Ajmal Amirov (born 16 September 1985) is a Tajikistani athlete specializing in middle-distance events. He represented his country at 5 consecutive World Indoor Championships each time failing to advance past first round.

== Competition record ==
Year	Competition	Venue	Position	Event	Notes
Representing Tajikistan
2002	World Junior Championships	Kingston, Jamaica	26th (h)	1500 m	4:01.91
2002	Asian Junior Championships	Bangkok, Thailand	4th	5000 m	15:44.01
2003	World Indoor Championships	Birmingham, United Kingdom	22nd (h)	3000 m	8:38.37
2003	Asian Championships	Manila, Philippines	17th (h)	1500 m	4:03.33
2003	Asian Championships	Manila, Philippines	12th	5000 m	15:29.97
2003	Asian Championships	Manila, Philippines	–	10,000 m	DNF
2004	Asian Indoor Championships	Tehran, Iran	7th	3000 m	8:43.85
2004	World Indoor Championships	Budapest, Hungary	22nd (h)	3000 m	8:38.37
2004	Asian Junior Championships	Ipoh, Malaysia	6th	1500 m	3:55.59
2004	Asian Junior Championships	Ipoh, Malaysia	4th	5000 m	15:01.82
2004	World Junior Championships	Grosseto, Italy	18th	5000 m	14:25.86
2005	Asian Championships	Incheon, South Korea	9th	1500 m	3:51.15
2005	Asian Championships	Incheon, South Korea	8th	5000 m	14:43.29
2006	Asian Indoor Championships	Pattaya, Thailand	–	1500 m	DNF
2006	Asian Indoor Championships	Pattaya, Thailand	5th	3000 m	8:20.92
2006	World Indoor Championships	Moscow, Russia	23rd (h)	1500 m	3:51.75
2006	Asian Games	Doha, Qatar	10th	1500 m	3:50.06
2006	Asian Games	Doha, Qatar	10th	5000 m	14:40.35
2006	Asian Games	Doha, Qatar	–	3000 m s'chase	DNF
2007	Asian Indoor Games	Macau	8th	1500 m	4:00.68
2008	World Indoor Championships	Valencia, Spain	28th (h)	1500 m	3:57.47
2009	Universiade	Belgrade, Serbia	13th (h)	1500 m	3:46.18
2009	Universiade	Belgrade, Serbia	19th (h)	5000 m	14:20.99
2009	Asian Championships	Guangzhou, China	18th (h)	1500 m	4:02.73
2009	Asian Championships	Guangzhou, China	–	5000 m	DNF
2010	Asian Indoor Championships	Tehran, Iran	8th	1500 m	4:14.22
2010	Asian Indoor Championships	Tehran, Iran	8th	3000 m	9:33.04
2010	World Indoor Championships	Doha, Qatar	24th (h)	1500 m	4:03.75
2010	Asian Games	Guangzhou, China	18th (h)	800 m	1:53.34
2010	Asian Games	Guangzhou, China	9th (h)	1500 m	3:52.56

== Personal bests ==
Outdoor

- 1500 metres – 3:46.18 (Belgrade 2009)
- 3000 metres – 8:16.42 (Pune 2007)
- 5000 metres – 14:20.99 (Belgrade 2009)

Indoor

- 1500 metres – 3:51.75 (Moscow 2006)
- 3000 metres – 8:20.92 (Pattaya 2006)
