= Chaminda Indika Wijekoon =

Sri Lankan middle-distance runner

Medal record

Men's athletics

Representing Sri Lanka

Asian Championships
Silver medal – second place	2009 Guangzhou	1500 m

Chaminda Indika Wijekoon (born 15 September 1981) is a Sri Lankan middle-distance runner specialising in the 1500 metres. He represented his country at the 2011 World Championships where he reached the semifinals after breaking the national record in the heats. His another major success is the fourth place at the 2010 Commonwealth Games.

== Competition record ==
Year	Competition	Venue	Position	Event	Notes
Representing Sri Lanka
2000	World Junior Championships	Santiago, Chile	24th (h)	1500 m	3:54.34
2002	Asian Championships	Colombo, Sri Lanka	7th	1500 m	3:52.33
2003	Asian Championships	Manila, Philippines	8th	1500 m	3:48.33
2003	Afro-Asian Games	Hyderabad, India	5th	1500 m	3:51.66
2004	South Asian Games	Islamabad, Pakistan	2nd	1500 m	3:44.85
2005	Asian Championships	Incheon, South Korea	6th	1500 m	3:48.29
2006	South Asian Games	Colombo, Sri Lanka	2nd	1500 m	3:45.60
2006	Lusophony Games	Macau, China	1st	1500 m	3:56.67
2006	Asian Games	Doha, Qatar	14th (h)	1500 m	3:54.00
2009	Lusophony Games	Lisbon, Portugal	1st	1500 m	3:48.15
2009	Asian Championships	Guangzhou, China	2nd	1500 m	3:47.01
2010	South Asian Games	Dhaka, Bangladesh	1st	1500 m	4:10.01
2010	South Asian Games	Dhaka, Bangladesh	3rd	5000 m	14:47.68
2010	Commonwealth Games	Delhi, India	4th	1500 m	3:42.93
2010	Asian Games	Guangzhou, China	15th (h)	1500 m	3:55.25
2011	Asian Championships	Kobe, Japan	3rd	1500 m	3:44.01
2011	World Championships	Daegu, South Korea	12th (sf)	1500 m	3:44.81
2015	Asian Championships	Wuhan, China	8th	5000 m	14:23.77

== Personal bests ==
- 800 metres – 1:52.12 (Colombo 2009)
- 1500 metres – 3:39.61 (Daegu 2011) NR
- 3000 metres – 8:02.91 (Mondovi 2011) NR
- 5000 metres – 14:11.65 (Pergine Valsugana 2010)
- 3000 metres steeplechase – 8:57.00 (Bangkok 2006)
