= Taylor Milne =

Canadian middle-distance runner

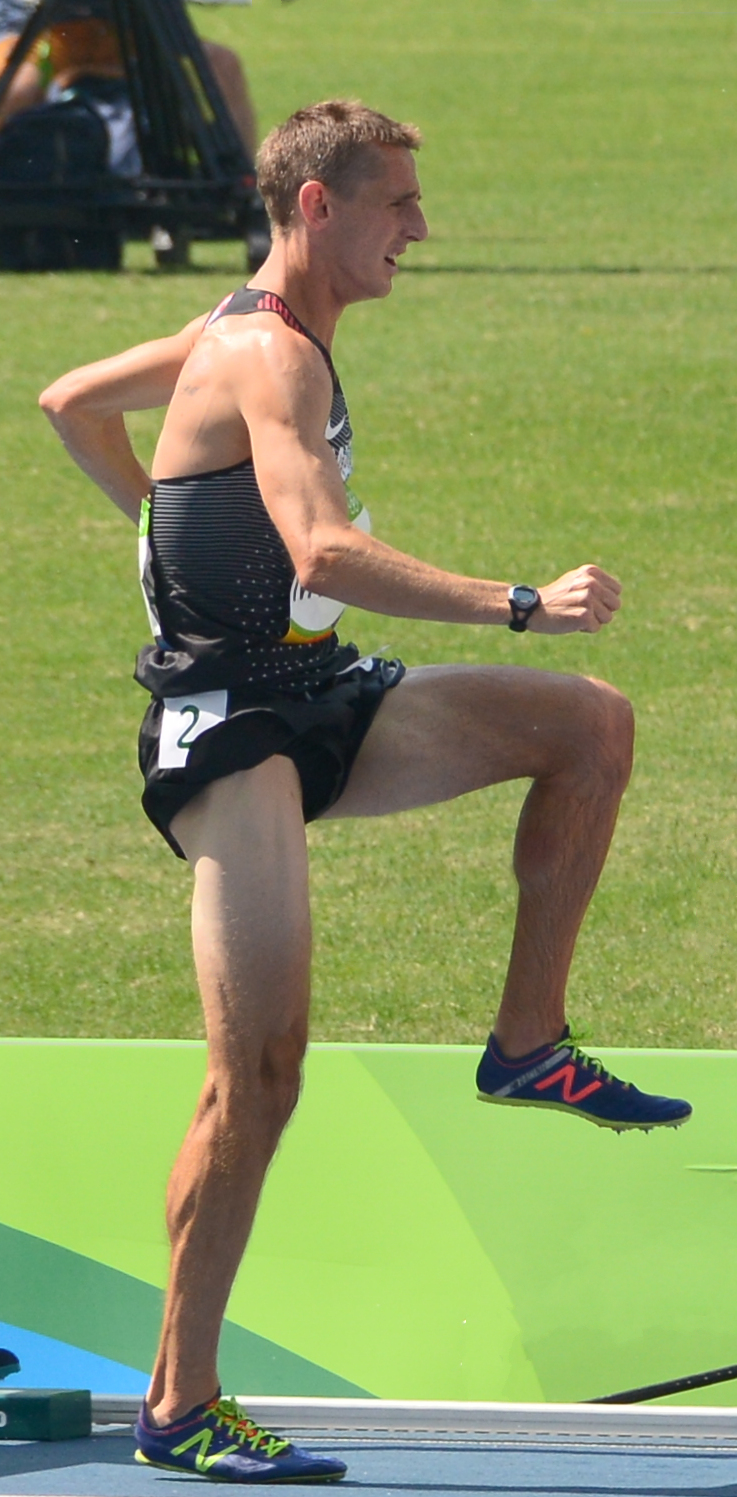
- Milne at the 2016 Olympics

Personal information
- Nationality: Canada
- Born: September 14, 1981 (age 44) Callander, Ontario, Canada
- Home town: Guelph, Ontario, Canada
- Education: High Point University, U.S.
- Height: 1.75 m (5 ft 9 in)
- Weight: 60 kg (132 lb)

Sport
- Sport: Athletics
- Event: Middle distance running
- Club: Speed River Track
- Coached by: Dave Scott-Thomas

Achievements and titles
- Personal bests: 1500 m: 3:36.00 (2008); 1 mile: 3:54.29 (2012); 2000 m: 5:01.57 (2011); 3000 m: 7:54.26 (2008); 3000 mS:8:19.90 (2015)

Taylor Milne (born September 14, 1981) is a Canadian middle distance runner. Milne made his official debut at the 2008 Summer Olympics in Beijing, where he competed in the 1500 metres. At the 2016 Olympics he was eliminated in the heats of the 3000 m steeplechase.

Milne first appeared and competed as part of the national team at the 2006 IAAF World Cross Country Championships in Fukuoka, Japan, where he placed twenty-eighth in the men's senior eight kilometre run. In 2008, he set his personal best time and an equal Olympic A-standard of 3:36.00 by winning the 1500 metres at the Harry Jerome International Track Classic in Burnaby, British Columbia, which earned him a qualifying spot for the Summer Olympics in Beijing. Two weeks later, Milne captured another title and set a new championship meet record of 3:38.03 at the Canadian Track and Field Championships in Windsor, Ontario, to fully secure his place for the Olympics, along with fellow athletes Nathan Brannen and Kevin Sullivan, who he considered to be his personal hero.

At the 2008 Summer Olympics, Milne ran in the first heat of men's 1500 metres, against ten other athletes, including Leonel Manzano of the United States, and New Zealand's Nick Willis, who eventually won the silver medal in the final. He finished the race in ninth place by approximately two seconds behind Reyes Estévez of Spain, outside his personal best of 3:41.56. Milne, unlike his two other teammates, failed to advance into the semi-finals, as he ranked below five mandatory qualifying slots for the next round.

Milne also sought to qualify for his second Olympic games in London; however, he failed to attain an Olympic A-standard of 3:35.50, and finished behind Brannen at the Canadian Track and Field Championships in Calgary, Alberta, outside further from his personal best time of 3:50.07.

Milne currently resides in North Bay, Ontario, and is an Elite Pickleball Player while working for Canada Post who also worked for numerous top-level Canadian athletes. He has a degree in business administration from the High Point University in the United States, and worked as a field researcher for a company in Ontario which develops geospatial technology.
