= Bayron Piedra =

Ecuadorian runner (born 1982)

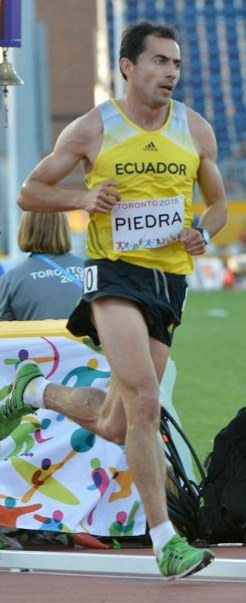
- Piedra at the 2015 Pan American Games

Personal information
- Full name: Bayron Efrén Piedra Avilés
- Born: August 19, 1982 (age 43) Cuenca, Azuay, Ecuador
- Height: 1.75 m (5 ft 9 in)
- Weight: 68 kg (150 lb)

Sport
- Country: Ecuador
- Sport: Athletics
Medal record
Men's Athletics
Representing Ecuador
South American Championships
Gold medal – first place	2013 Cartagena	5000 m
Bolivarian Games
Gold medal – first place	2005 Armenia	1500 m
Gold medal – first place	2009 Sucre	1500 m
Gold medal – first place	2009 Sucre	5000 m
Gold medal – first place	2009 Sucre	10,000 m
Pan American Games
Silver medal – second place	2011 Guadalajara	5000 metres
Silver medal – second place	2011 Guadalajara	1500 metres
Bronze medal – third place	2007 Rio de Janeiro	1500 metres
- Updated on 12 May 2014

Bayron Efrén Piedra Avilés (born August 19, 1982) is an Ecuadorian middle distance and long-distance runner.

He won the 2007 and 2008 editions of the Guayaquil Marathon. He also competed at the 2004 Olympic Games, the 2005 Summer Universiade, the 2007 World Championships, the 2008 Olympic Games and the 2012 Olympic Games without reaching the final round.

He demonstrated his regional strength with a double gold in the 1500 metres and 5000 metres at the 2009 South American Championships in Athletics. He decided to run in both the 1500 m and 5000 m races at the 2009 World Championships in Athletics but he did not succeed in either event, finishing third last in the heats of the 1500 m and failing to finish at all in the 5000 m

He has medalled at regional competitions a number of times. He took part in the 2003 Pan American Games and reached the 1500 m final, finishing in eighth. In 2004, he came within a second of scoring a long race/short race double at the South American Cross Country Championships, but Juan Suárez of Argentina just finished ahead of him in the short competition. He won a bronze in the long race in 2006. He improved upon his past performance by taking a bronze in the 2007 Pan American Games.

== Personal bests ==
- 800 metres: 1:46.55 min NR – Belém, 25 May 2008
- 1500 metres: 3:37.88 min NR – Rio de Janeiro, 25 July 2007
- 3000 metres: 7:47.06 min NR – Belém, 19 May 2010
- 5000 metres: 13:23.72 min NR – Ninove, 21 July 2012
- 10000 metres: 27:32.59 min NR – Stanford, 1 May 2011
- Half marathon: 1:02:35 hrs – New York City, 20 March 2016
- Marathon: 2:14:12 hrs – Rio de Janeiro, 21 August 2016

== International competitions ==
Year	Competition	Venue	Position	Event	Notes
Representing Ecuador
1999	South American Junior Championships	Concepción, Chile	9th	1500 m	4:07.61 min
1999	South American Junior Championships	Concepción, Chile	8th	3000 m s'chase	10:18.94 min
2000	South American Cross Country Championships	Cartagena, Colombia	11th	Junior course (8.0 km)	28:01 min
2000	World Cross Country Championships	Vilamoura, Portugal	87th	Junior course (8.1 km)	26:09 min
2000	South American Junior Championships	São Leopoldo, Brazil	2nd	1500 m	3:54.70 min
2000	South American Junior Championships	São Leopoldo, Brazil	6th	3000 m s'chase	9:41.06 min
2001	South American Championships	Manaus, Brazil	6th	1500 m	3:52.42 min
2001	South American Championships	Manaus, Brazil	6th	5000 m	15:38.71 min
2001	South American Championships	Manaus, Brazil	5th	4 × 400 m relay	3:18.52 min
2001	South American Junior Championships	Santa Fe, Argentina	3rd	1500 m	3:52.91 min
2001	South American Junior Championships	Santa Fe, Argentina	5th	4 × 400 m relay	3:18.07 min
2001	Pan American Junior Championships	Santa Fe, Argentina	5th	1500 m	3:57.21 min
2002	Ibero-American Championships	Guatemala City, Guatemala	8th	1500 m	3:58.01 min
2003	South American Road Mile Championships	Belém, Brazil	5th	One mile	4:17 min
2003	South American Championships	Barquisimeto, Venezuela	5th	800 m	1:49.25 min
2003	South American Championships	Barquisimeto, Venezuela	4th	1500 m	3:43.86 min
2003	Pan American Games	Santo Domingo, Dominican Republic	8th	1500 m	3:52.20 min
2003	Universiade	Daegu, South Korea	–	1500 m	DNF
2004	South American Cross Country Championships	Macaé, Brazil	1st	Long course	36:44 min
2004	South American Cross Country Championships	Macaé, Brazil	2nd	Short course	11:27 min
2004	World Cross Country Championships	Brussels, Belgium	63rd	Short course (4.0 km)	12:32 min
2004	South American U23 Championships	Barquisimeto, Venezuela	1st	800 m	1:47.43 min
2004	South American U23 Championships	Barquisimeto, Venezuela	1st	1500 m	3:46.37 min
2004	Ibero-American Championships	Huelva, Spain	4th	1500 m	3:40.88 min
2004	Ibero-American Championships	Huelva, Spain	6th	3000 m	8:08.58 min
2004	Olympic Games	Athens, Greece	56th (h)	800 m	1:48.42 min
2005	South American Championships	Cali, Colombia	2nd	1500 m	3:41.90 min
2005	South American Championships	Cali, Colombia	1st	5000 m	14:12.24 min
2005	Universiade	İzmir, Turkey	19th (h)	1500 m	3:50.03
2005	Bolivarian Games	Armenia, Colombia	1st	1500 m	3:44.62 min GR A
2006	South American Cross Country Championships	Mar del Plata, Argentina	3rd	Long course	37:06 min
2006	South American Championships	Tunja, Colombia	3rd	1500 m	3:54.48 min
2006	South American Championships	Tunja, Colombia	2nd	5000 m	15:00.00 min
2007	South American Championships	São Paulo, Brazil	1st	1500 m	3:42.53 min
2007	South American Championships	São Paulo, Brazil	5th	5000 m	14:15.48 min
2007	Pan American Games	Rio de Janeiro, Brazil	12th (h)	800 m	1:48.56 min
2007	Pan American Games	Rio de Janeiro, Brazil	3rd	1500 m	3:37.88 min
2007	World Championships	Osaka, Japan	33rd (h)	1500 m	3:45.59 min
2007	Guayaquil Marathon	Guayaquil, Ecuador	1st	Marathon	2:20:58 hrs
2008	South American Road Mile Championships	Belém, Brazil	3rd	One mile	4:09 min
2008	Ibero-American Championships	Iquique, Chile	2nd	1500m	3:42.65 min
2008	Ibero-American Championships	Iquique, Chile	1st	3000 m	7:54.69 min NR
2008	Olympic Games	Beijing, China	41st (h)	1500 m	3:45.57 min
2008	Guayaquil Marathon	Guayaquil, Ecuador	1st	Marathon	2:20:42 hrs
2009	ALBA Games	Havana, Cuba	2nd	1500 m	3:44.74 min
2009	ALBA Games	Havana, Cuba	1st	5000 m	14:03.13 min
2009	South American Road Mile Championships	Belém, Brazil	1st	One mile	3:57 min
2009	South American Championships	Lima, Peru	1st	1500 m	3:41.81 min
2009	South American Championships	Lima, Peru	1st	5000 m	13:56.93 min
2009	Universiade	Belgrade, Serbia	13th	1500 m	3:50.11 min
2009	Universiade	Belgrade, Serbia	2nd	5000 m	14:07.11 min
2009	World Championships	Berlin, Germany	45th (h)	1500 m	3:49.60 min
2009	Bolivarian Games	Sucre, Bolivia	1st	1500 m	3:50.53 min A
2009	Bolivarian Games	Sucre, Bolivia	1st	5000 m	15:05.1 min A
2009	Bolivarian Games	Sucre, Bolivia	1st	10,000 m	31:07.10 min A
2010	Continental Cup	Split, Croatia	3rd	3000 m	7:55.52 min
2011	World Championships	Daegu, South Korea	–	10,000 m	DNF
2011	Pan American Games	Guadalajara, Mexico	2nd	1500 m	3:53.45 min
2011	Pan American Games	Guadalajara, Mexico	2nd	5000 m	14:15.74 min
2012	Olympic Games	London, United Kingdom	–	10,000 m	DNF
2013	South American Championships	Cartagena, Colombia	1st	5000 m	14:15.35 min
2013	World Championships	Moscow, Russia	22nd (h)	5000 m	13:35.38 min
2013	Bolivarian Games	Trujillo, Peru	2nd	10,000 m	29:01.64 min
2014	South American Games	Santiago, Chile	5th	5000 m	14:15.49 min
2014	South American Games	Santiago, Chile	1st	10,000 m	28:48.31 min
2014	South American Half Marathon Championships	Asunción, Paraguay	1st	Half marathon	1:09:24 hrs
2014	Ibero-American Championships	Huelva, Spain	2nd	3000 m	7:59.55 min
2014	Ibero-American Championships	Huelva, Spain	1st	5000 m	13:50.20 min
2015	Pan American Cross Country Cup	Barranquilla, Colombia	5th	10 km	28:47
2015	Pan American Cross Country Cup	Barranquilla, Colombia	2nd	Team - 10 km	52 pts
2015	World Cross Country Championships	Guiyang, China	54th	12 km	38:25
2015	World Cross Country Championships	Guiyang, China	16th	Team	299 pts
2015	South American Championships	Lima, Peru	3rd	5000 m	14:08.84
2015	South American Championships	Lima, Peru	1st	10,000 m	28:30.80
2016	Olympic Games	Rio de Janeiro, Brazil	18th	Marathon	2:14:12
2017	South American Championships	Asunción, Paraguay	1st	10,000 m	29:03.73
2017	World Championships	London, United Kingdom	21st	10,000 m	28:50.72
2017	Bolivarian Games	Santa Marta, Colombia	10th	Half marathon	1:12:23
2018	South American Games	Cochabamba, Bolivia	1st	5000 m	14:32.47
2018	South American Games	Cochabamba, Bolivia	3rd	10,000 m	30:51.74
2019	South American Championships	Lima, Peru	1st	10,000 m	28:48.13
