= Emad Noor =

Saudi Arabian middle-distance runner

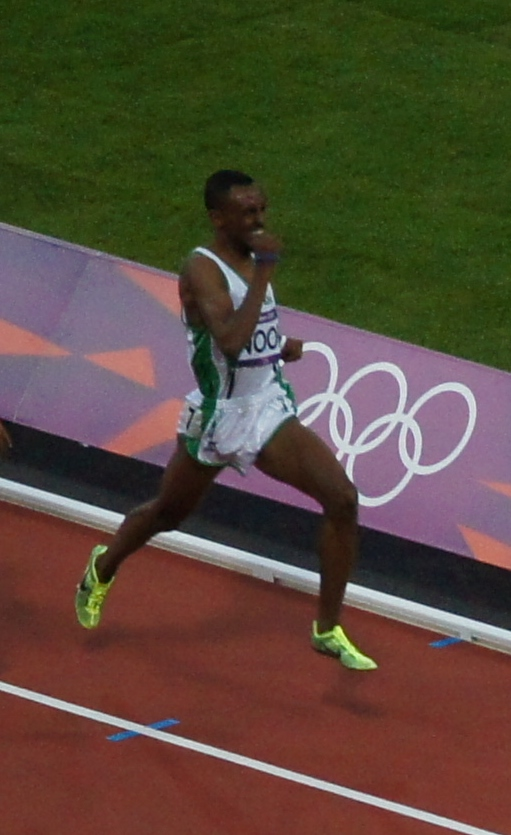
- Noor at the 2012 Summer Olympics

Personal information
- Nationality: Saudi
- Born: April 21, 1990 (age 36) Khamis Mushait, Saudi Arabia

Sport
- Sport: Track
- Event: 1500 metres

Achievements and titles
- Personal best(s): 800 metres: 1:46.85; 1500 metres: 3:34.19
Medal record
Men's athletics
Representing Saudi Arabia
Asian Athletics Championships
Gold medal – first place	2013 Pune	1500 m

Emad Hamed Noor (born 21 April 1990) is a Saudi Arabian middle-distance runner. He represented his country at the 2012 Summer Olympics.

== Running career ==
=== Junior career ===
Noor's first appearance at a major international competition took place when he ran the 1500 metres at the 2007 Pan Arab Games, recording a time of 3:51.34 (min:sec) at the age of 17. At the 2008 Asian Junior Athletics Championships, he finished in second in the 1500 metres with a time of 3:49.47.

=== Senior career ===
In the 1500 metre race at the 2009 Asian Athletics Championships, he finished fourth overall in the final round in a race won by compatriot Mohammed Shaween. In the 1500 metres race at the 2012 Summer Olympics, he did not qualify beyond the preliminaries although he ran a time of 3:42.95. Noor won his first medal at the 2013 Asian Athletics Championships, where he finished in first place in the 1500 metre race.

== See also ==
- Saudi Arabia Track and Field at the 2012 Summer Olympics
