= Sergey Pakura =

Kyrgysztani middle-distance runner

Personal information
- Nationality: Kyrgyzstan
- Born: 3 May 1983 (age 43)
- Height: 1.86 m (6 ft 1 in)
- Weight: 70 kg (154 lb)

Sport
- Sport: Athletics
- Event: Middle distance running

Achievements and titles
- Personal bests: 800 m: 1:46.98 (2008); 1500 m: 3:47.91 (2008)

Sergey Pakura (Russian: Серге́й Пакура, Пакура Сергей; born May 3, 1983) is a Kyrgyzstani middle-distance runner. Pakura represented Kyrgyzstan at the 2008 Summer Olympics in Beijing, where he competed for the men's 800 metres. He ran in the seventh heat, against six other athletes including American middle-distance runner Andrew Wheating, and Robert Lathouwers of the Netherlands. He finished the race in last place by two seconds behind Jamaica's Aldwyn Sappleton, with a time of 1:50.54. Pakura, however, failed to advance into the semi-finals, as he placed fifty-second overall, and was ranked farther below two mandatory slots for the next round.

== Competition record ==
Year	Competition	Venue	Position	Event	Notes
Representing Kyrgyzstan
2006	World Indoor Championships	Moscow, Russia	22nd (h)	1500 m	3:50.86 (iNR)
2006	Asian Games	Guangzhou, China	9th	1500 m	3:48.83
2008	Asian Indoor Championships	Doha, Qatar	6th	1500 m	3:57.63
2008	World Indoor Championships	Valencia, Spain	27th (h)	1500 m	3:57.28
2008	Olympic Games	Beijing, China	52nd (h)	800 m	1:50.54
2009	Asian Championships	Guangzhou, China	16th (h)	1500 m	3:55.13
2010	Asian Indoor Championships	Tehran, Iran	7th	1500 m	4:05.74
2010	Asian Games	Guangzhou, China	6th (h)	800 m	1:51.25
2010	Asian Games	Guangzhou, China	11th	1500 m	3:52.66
