= Isaiah Msibi =

Swazi middle-distance runner

Personal information
- Nationality: Eswatini
- Born: 15 February 1984 (age 42)
- Height: 1.70 m (5 ft 7 in)
- Weight: 62 kg (137 lb)

Sport
- Sport: Athletics
- Event: 1500 m

Achievements and titles
- Personal best: 1500 m – 3:51.35

Isaiah Msibi (born February 15, 1984) is a Swazi middle-distance runner. He represented Swaziland at the 2008 Summer Olympics in Beijing, and competed in the men's 1500 metres. Msibi ran in the second heat of the competition, finishing in twelfth place, with a personal best time of 3:51.35.
