= Hamza Chatholi =

Indian athlete (born 1981)

Hamza Chatoli
Personal information
- Nationality: Indian
- Born: 1 November 1981 (age 44) Kerala, India

Sport
- Coached by: Nikolai Snesarev (2007)

Achievements and titles
- Personal bests: 1500 m (Outdoor): 3:39.9 (Jamshedpur 2007); 200 m (Indoor): 3:41.18 NR (Doha 2008)
Medal record
Men's athletics
Representing India
Asian Championships
Bronze medal – third place	2009 Guangzhou	1500 m
Asian Indoor Games
Gold medal – first place	2007 Macau	1500 m
Asian Indoor Championships
Silver medal – second place	2008 Doha	1500 m
South Asian Games
Gold medal – first place	2006 Colombo	1500 m
Military Games
Bronze medal – third place	2007 Hyderabad	1500 m

Hamza Chatoli (born 1 November 1981) is an Indian athlete who competes in the 1500 metres event. In the 2007 Asian Indoor Games, he won the gold medal in beating defending champion Abubaker Ali Kamal of Qatar and set a new games record.
