= Youssef Baba =

Moroccan middle-distance runner

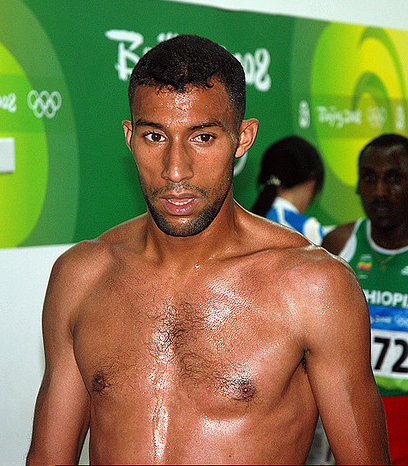
- Baba at the 2008 Olympics

Personal information
- Born: 7 August 1979 (age 46) Khenifra, Morocco
- Height: 176 cm (5 ft 9 in)
- Weight: 58 kg (128 lb)

Sport
- Sport: Athletics
- Events: 1500 m, 3000 m
- Club: Chabab Atlas Khénifra; Club Meknassi
- Coached by: Ayachi Amekdouf

Achievements and titles
- Personal bests: 1500 m – 3:32.13 (2007); 3000 m – 7:52.99 (2006)
Medal record
Men's athletics
Representing Morocco
World Cross Country Championships
Bronze medal – third place	2000 Vilamoura	4.18 km team
African Championships
Gold medal – first place	2000 Algiers	1500 m

Youssef Baba (Arabic: يوسف بابا; born 7 August 1979) is a retired middle-distance runner from Morocco. He competed in the 1500 m event at the 2000, 2004 and 2008 Olympics with the best result of 12th place in 2000.
