= Hari Kumar Rimal =

Nepalese long-distance runner

Personal information
- Born: 13 June 1987 (age 39)

Sport
- Country: Nepal
- Sport: Athletics
Medal record
Men's athletics
Representing Nepal
South Asian Games
Bronze medal – third place	2019 Kathmandu	5000 m

Hari Kumar Rimal (born 13 June 1987) is a Nepalese long-distance runner. He competed at the 2016 Summer Olympics in Rio de Janeiro, in the men's 5000 metres.
