= Daham Najim Bashir =

Kenyan-born Qatari middle-distance runner

Medal record

Men's athletics

Representing Qatar

Asian Games
| Gold medal – first place | 2006 Doha | 1500 metres |

Asian Championships
| Silver medal – second place | 2005 Incheon | 5000 m |

Asian Indoor Championships
| Gold medal – first place | 2006 Pattaya | 1500 m |

Daham Najim Bashir (Arabic: دهام نجم بشير; born David Nyaga on 8 November 1979) is a Kenyan-born middle-distance runner now representing Qatar.

At the 2005 Bislett Games, he set a new Asian record over one mile with 3:47.97 minutes. In 2006, he won a silver medal in 1500 metres at the 2006 Asian Indoor Athletics Championships before taking the gold medal at that distance at the 2006 Asian Games. He represented Qatar in the mens 1500m at the 2005 World Championships in Athletics and the 2008 Summer Olympics, finishing tenth both times.
