= Rashid Ramzi =

Moroccan-born middle distance runner for Bahrain

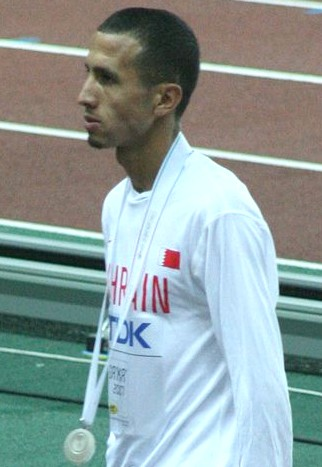
- Rashid Ramzi with his silver medal for the men's 1500 metres at the 2007 World Championships in Athletics

Medal record

Representing Bahrain

Men's athletics

Summer Olympics
Disqualified	2008 Beijing	1500 m

World Championships
Gold medal – first place	2005 Helsinki	800 m
Gold medal – first place	2005 Helsinki	1500 m
Silver medal – second place	2007 Osaka	1500 m

Asian Games
Gold medal – first place	2002 Busan	1500 m
Bronze medal – third place	2006 Doha	1500 m
Silver medal – second place	2014 Incheon	1500 m

Asian Championships
Gold medal – first place	2003 Manila	1500 m
Silver medal – second place	2002 Colombo	1500 m

Asian Indoor Championships
Gold medal – first place	2004 Tehran	800 m
Gold medal – first place	2004 Tehran	1500 m

Rashid Ramzi (Arabic: رشيد رمزي) (born July 17, 1980) is a Moroccan-Bahraini track and field athlete competing internationally for Bahrain in the 800 metres and 1500 metres. Ramzi was investigated by the IAAF after the 2008 Summer Olympics and was stripped of his gold medal for doping.

Ramzi was born in Safi, Morocco. After transferring to Bahrain, he ascended to the top of the Asian scene, winning gold medals at the Asian Athletics Championships and the 2002 Asian Games. He set an Asian indoor record over 800 metres to take the silver at the 2004 IAAF World Indoor Championships—his first global medal—and took part in the 2004 Athens Olympics. He reached the peak of his discipline the following year by becoming both the 800 m and 1500 m champion at the 2005 World Championships in Athletics – the first man to ever do such a double at the competition.

He failed to retain his titles at the 2007 World Championships, but still took the silver medal over 1500 m. At the 2008 Summer Olympics he was the recipient of the first-ever medal for Bahrain at the Olympics – winning the 1500 m gold medal. However, his result did not stand and he was excluded from the sport for two years after his test came back positive for the banned blood-boosting substance CERA.

== Career ==
=== Early competition and transfer ===
Ramzi was raised in Safi, and competed internationally for Morocco, winning the 1500 metres silver medal at the 1999 African Junior Athletics Championships and then winning at the national championships in 2001. until he joined the Bahraini armed forces and gained citizenship in 2002.

Following the nationality transfer, he began competing for Bahrain immediately – he won silver at the 2002 Asian Athletics Championships and then took the 1500 m gold at the 2002 Asian Games. He scored three 1500 m gold medals at regional championships in 2003, winning at the Pan Arab Athletics Championships, the Gulf Cooperation Council Championships, and beating all opposition at the 2003 Asian Athletics Championships.

The 2004 season saw him break through onto the global scene – he won 800 metres and 1500 m golds at the 2004 Asian Indoor Athletics Championships (setting an Asian record at the shorter distance) and then took the silver medal at the 2004 IAAF World Indoor Championships the following month, improving his 800 m area record and just finishing behind Mbulaeni Mulaudzi. Competing on the European circuit, he took his first Golden League win in the 1500 m at the Golden Gala in Rome. Later that year, he represented his adopted country at the 2008 Summer Olympics for the first time and he reached the semi-finals of the 1500 m at the 2004 Athens Olympics.

=== Double world champion ===
At the 2005 World Championships in Athletics, Ramzi repeated the 1964 accomplishment of Peter Snell to win gold medals in the 800 m and 1500 m at the same competition in a global competition (World Championship or Summer Olympics).

He followed this with a bronze medal at the 2006 Asian Games and upgraded his successive medal to the silver medal in the 1500 m at the 2007 World Championships. Ramzi won the gold at the 2008 Beijing Summer Olympics the next year but he was later stripped of the Olympic title.

=== Doping scandal ===
In April 2009, the Bahrain Olympic Committee reported that Ramzi tested positive for doping at the Beijing Games. Ramzi tested positive for CERA, an advanced version of the blood-boosting drug EPO. Ramzi's backup “B” sample was tested on June 18, 2009, and in July 2009, it was announced Ramzi's "B" sample had tested positive as well. In November 2009, Ramzi was stripped of his gold medal.

He spends much of his time in Morocco to train at high altitudes (the highest point in Bahrain is only 440 ft. above sea level).

== Personal bests ==
Distance	Mark	Date	Location
800 m	1:44.05	July 17, 2006	Madrid, Spain
1,500 m	3:29.14	July 14, 2006	Rome, Italy
1 mile	3:51.33	June 4, 2005	Eugene, Oregon, United States

== Achievements ==
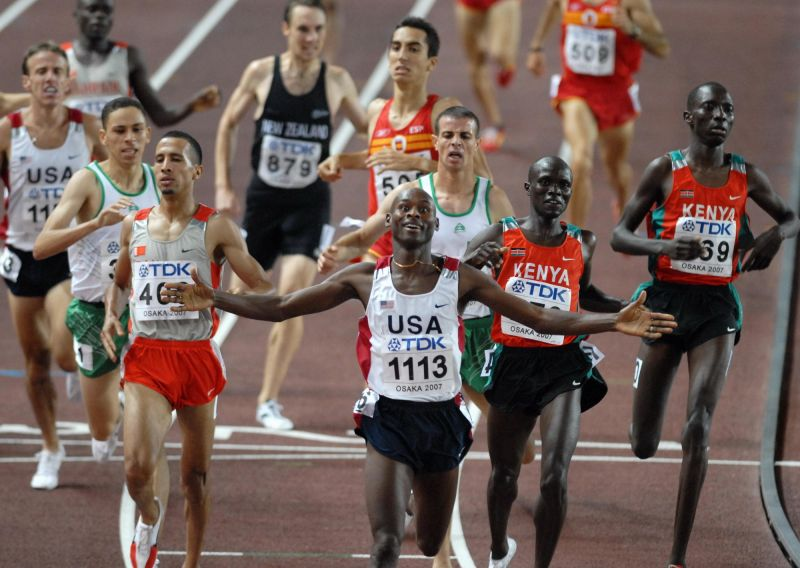
Ramzi (left) taking the silver at the 2007 World Championships

Year	Competition	Venue	Position	Notes
Representing Morocco
1999	African Junior Championships	Tunis, Tunisia	2nd	1500 m
Representing Bahrain
2002	Asian Championships	Colombo, Sri Lanka	2nd	1500 m
2002	Asian Games	Busan, South Korea	1st	1500 m
2003	Gulf Cooperation Council Championships	Kuwait City, Kuwait	1st	1500 m
2003	Asian Championships	Manila, Philippines	1st	1500 m
2003	Pan Arab Championships	Amman, Jordan	1st	1500 m
2004	Asian Indoor Championships	Tehran, Iran	1st	800 m
2004	Asian Indoor Championships	Tehran, Iran	1st	1500 m
2004	World Indoor Championships	Budapest, Hungary	2nd	800 m
2004	Olympic Games	Athens, Greece	11th (semis)	1500 m
2005	World Cross Country Championships	Saint-Galmier, France	32nd	Short race
2005	World Championships	Helsinki, Finland	1st	800 m
2005	World Championships	Helsinki, Finland	1st	1500 m
2005	World Athletics Final	Monte Carlo, Monaco	8th	1500 m
2006	Asian Games	Doha, Qatar	3rd	1500 m
2007	World Championships	Osaka, Japan	8th (semis)	800 m
2007	World Championships	Osaka, Japan	2nd	1500 m
2008	World Indoor Championships	Valencia, Spain	5th	1500 m
2008	Summer Olympics	Beijing, China	1st (DQ)	1500 m
2014	Asian Games	Incheon, South Korea	2nd	1500 m

== See also ==
- List of doping cases in athletics
