= Mohammed Shaween =

Saudi Arabian middle-distance runner

Medal record

Men's athletics

Representing Saudi Arabia

Asian Games
Gold medal – first place	2010 Guangzhou	1500 m

Asian Championships
Gold medal – first place	2007 Amman	1500 m
Gold medal – first place	2007 Amman	4×400 m
Gold medal – first place	2009 Guangzhou	1500 m

Asian Indoor Championships
Gold medal – first place	2012 Hangzhou	1500 m

Mohammed Othman Shaween (born 15 February 1986 in Jeddah) is a Saudi Arabian middle-distance runner who specializes in the 1500 metres. He received a three-year ban from the sport for doping.

He finished eighth at the 2005 Asian Championships (in 800 m), sixth at the 2006 Asian Games and won the gold medal at the 2007 Asian Championships. He also competed in the 1500 metres at the 2007 World Championships and the 2008 Olympic Games without progressing to the second round. He won the gold medal in the 2010 Asian Games.

== Personal bests ==
- 800 metres - 1:48.51 min (2006)
- 1500 metres - 3:31.82 min (2011)
- Mile run - 3:52.00 min (2011)

== Doping ==
In November 2013 the Saudi Arabia Anti-Doping Committee announced that Shaween had received a three-year ban from the sport for doping after his biological passport had shown abnormalities. The ban ended on 12 February 2016.
