= Belal Mansoor Ali =

Bahraini middle-distance runner

Personal information
- Nationality: Bahraini
- Born: John Kipkorir Yego; 17 October 1988 (age 38) Kenya
- Height: 5'7'
- Weight: 58 kg (128 lb)

Sport
- Sport: Track and field
- Events: 800 metres, 1500 metres
- Club: Belal athletics Club
- Team: Gianni demadona

Achievements and titles
- Personal bests: 800 m: 1:44.02 (Rieti 2007); 1000m: 2:15.23 (Stockholm); 1500 m: 3:31.49 (Athens 2007)
Medal record
Representing Bahrain
Men's Athletics
Asian Games
Silver medal – second place	2006 Doha	1500 m
Bronze medal – third place	2010 Guangzhou	1500 m
Continental Cup
Bronze medal – third place	2010 Split	800 m

Belal Mansoor Ali (Arabic: بلال منصور علي; born 17 October 1988) is a middle distance runner now representing Bahrain after changing nationality from Kenya.

== Life and career ==
He was born John Yego on 17 October 1988 in Kenya. A lot of controversy has surrounded his age, starting when he won the 1500 metres race at the 2005 IAAF World Youth Championships in Marrakesh, Morocco, and became suspected for age cheating. In August 2005 the IAAF opened an investigation regarding Belal Mansoor Ali, Tareq Mubarak Taher and Aadam Ismaeel Khamis, all Bahraini athletes born in Kenya.

The same month Ali was competed at the 2005 World Championships. His most successful event was the 800 metres, where he placed seventh in the final. In June he had set a personal best time over 800 metres of 1:44.34 minutes in Conegliano, Italy; at the time, that was a world youth best, equivalent with the World Record for under age 18.

In July 2006 Ali was arrested in Kenya, suspected of age cheating at the 2005 World Youth Championships. The IAAF Council, gathered in Beijing while the 2006 World Junior Championships took place, reported the slow progression of the case. A few days before, Ali had actually won a World Junior bronze medal over 1500 metres and finished seventh over 800 metres on the track. In late 2006 Ali was cleared of all charges, and in December he won a silver medal at the 2006 Asian Games. In November 2010 he won the bronze medal at the Asian Games. He is now focusing on Marathon training and road racing after a couple of years of tendon and hamstring injuries.

Records
Preceded by (Kenya) Benson Marrianyi Esho	Boys' World Youth Best Holder, 800 metres 17 June 2005 – 9 July 2011	Succeeded by (Kenya) Leonard Kirwa Kosencha
