= Algeria at the World Athletics Championships =

- WA code: ALG
- National federation: Algerian Athletics Federation
- Website: www.faa.dz
- Medals Ranked 34th: Gold 6 Silver 3 Bronze 3 Total 12

World Athletics Championships appearances (overview)
- 1983; 1987; 1991; 1993; 1995; 1997; 1999; 2001; 2003; 2005; 2007; 2009; 2011; 2013; 2015; 2017; 2019; 2022; 2023; 2025

Algeria has competed at the World Athletics Championships on eighteen occasions, sending a delegation to every event since the 1983 edition. Its competing country code is ALG. The country has won six gold medals, two silver medals and three bronze medals at the competition. All eleven of its medals come from six athletes in distance track events. Noureddine Morceli won the men's 1500 metres titles in 1991, 1993 and 1995, while his female counterpart Hassiba Boulmerka won two golds and one bronze. Azzedine Brahmi won 1991 bronze in the men's 3000 metres steeplechase. Djabir Saïd-Guerni won the men's 800 metres bronze in 1999 before winning a gold medal in that event in 2003. In 2019, Taoufik Makhloufi won the silver in the men's 1500 metres, and in the subsequent edition, Djamel Sedjati won the silver in the men's 800 meters.

The best rank in the medals table achieved by Algeria in the history of its participation is seventh, achieved in 1991 with two golds and a bronze.

== Medals by World Championships ==
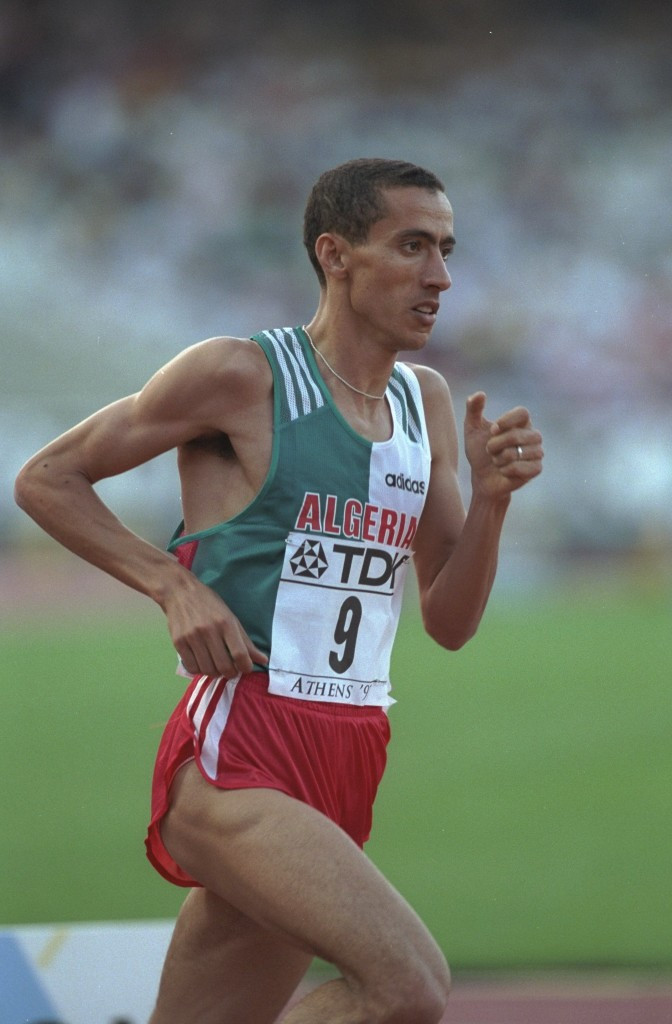
Noureddine Morceli is the most decorated athlete with gold medals (3 gold medals)

Championships	Athletes	Gold	Silver	Bronze	Total	Rank
1983 Helsinki	11	0	0	0	0	–
1987 Rome	4	0	0	0	0	–
1991 Tokyo	11	2	0	1	3	7
1993 Stuttgart	17	1	0	1	2	14
1995 Gothenburg	8	2	0	0	2	10
1997 Athens	14	0	0	0	0	–
1999 Seville	12	0	0	1	1	34
2001 Edmonton	12	0	0	0	0	–
2003 Paris	9	1	0	0	1	14
2005 Helsinki	10	0	0	0	0	–
2007 Osaka	11	0	0	0	0	–
2009 Berlin	6	0	0	0	0	–
2011 Daegu	10	0	0	0	0	–
2013 Moscow	11	0	0	0	0	–
2015 Beijing	14	0	0	0	0	–
2017 London	8	0	0	0	0	–
2019 Doha	6	0	1	0	1	27
2022 Oregon	7	0	1	0	1	33
2023 Budapest	10	0	0	0	0	–
2025 Tokyo	9	0	1	0	1	27
2027 Beijing	To be determined					
2029 Nairobi	To be determined					
2031 Munich	To be determined					
Total		6	3	3	12	34

=== Medalists ===
Medal	Name	Year	Event	Date
Gold	Hassiba Boulmerka	1991 Tokyo	Women's 1500 metres	31 August
Bronze	Azzedine Brahmi	1991 Tokyo	Men's 3000 metres steeplechase	31 August
Gold	Noureddine Morceli	1991 Tokyo	Men's 1500 metres	1 September
Bronze	Hassiba Boulmerka	1993 Stuttgart	Women's 1500 metres	22 August
Gold	Noureddine Morceli	1993 Stuttgart	Men's 1500 metres	22 August
Gold	Hassiba Boulmerka	1995 Gothenburg	Women's 1500 metres	9 August
Gold	Noureddine Morceli	1995 Gothenburg	Men's 1500 metres	13 August
Bronze	Djabir Saïd-Guerni	1999 Seville	Men's 800 metres	29 August
Gold	Djabir Saïd-Guerni	2003 Saint-Denis	Men's 800 metres	31 August
Silver	Taoufik Makhloufi	2019 Doha	Men's 1500 metres	6 October
Silver	Djamel Sedjati	2022 Oregon	Men's 800 metres	23 July
Silver	Djamel Sedjati	2025 Tokyo	Men's 800 metres	20 September

=== By athletes ===
Athlete	Sex	Gold	Silver	Bronze	Total	Editions
Noureddine Morceli	M	3	0	0	3	1991–1995
Hassiba Boulmerka	W	2	0	1	3	1991–1993
Djabir Saïd-Guerni	M	1	0	1	2	1999–2003
Djamel Sedjati	M	0	2	0	1	2022-2025
Taoufik Makhloufi	M	0	1	0	1	2019
Azzedine Brahmi	M	0	0	1	1	1991

=== By events ===
Event	Gold	Silver	Bronze	Total
Middle-distance running	6	3	3	12
Totals (1 entries)	6	3	3	12

=== By gender ===
Gender	Gold	Silver	Bronze	Total
Men	4	3	2	9
Women	2	0	1	3
Totals (2 entries)	6	3	3	12

== By edition ==
=== 1983 ===
Algeria competed at the 1983 World Championships in Athletics in Helsinki, Finland, from August 7 to 14, 1983.

==== Men ====
Track and road events

Athlete	Event	Heat		Semifinal		Final	
Athlete	Event	Result	Rank	Result	Rank	Result	Rank
Mehdi Aidet	1500 metres	did not start		Did not advance			
Amar Brahmia	1500 metres	3:42.75	25	Did not advance			
Abderrahmane Morceli	1500 metres	3:39.77	=10 q	3:39.88	18	Did not advance	
Abderrazak Bounour	5000 metres	13:57.93	10 q	14:00.78	14	Did not advance	
Boualem Rahoui	10,000 metres	29:10.95	26	Did not advance			
Abdelwahab Ferguène	20 km walk	—N/a				1:29:53	35
Benamar Kachkouche	20 km walk	—N/a				1:32:33	45

Field events

Athlete	Event	Qualification		Final	
Athlete	Event	Distance	Position	Distance	Position
Othmane Belfaa	High jump	2.15	20	Did not advance	
Hakim Toumi	Hammer throw	65.54	26	Did not advance	

Combined events – Decathlon

Athlete	Event	100 m	LJ	SP	HJ	400 m	110H	DT	PV	JT	1500 m	Final	Rank
Mourad Mahour Bacha	Result	11.64	6.69	NM	DNS							DNF	DNF
Mourad Mahour Bacha	Points	723	741	0	DNS							DNF	DNF

==== Women ====
Combined events – Heptathlon

Athlete	Event	100H	HJ	SP	200 m	LJ	JT	800 m	Final	Rank
Dalila Tayebi	Result	15.55	1.65	9.95	25.72	5.71	26.46	2:31.55	4759	19
Dalila Tayebi	Points	770	795	526	822	762	410	674	4759	19

=== 1987 ===
Algeria competed at the 1987 World Championships in Athletics in Rome, Italy, from 28 August to 6 September 1987. Algeria participated with 4 athletes.

Men
100 m	Mustapha Kamel Selmi
200 m	Mustapha Kamel Selmi
800 m	Reda Abdenouz
20 km Walk	Abdelwahab Ferguene
High Jump	Othmane Belfaa

==== Men ====
Track and road events

Athlete	Event	Heat		Quarterfinal		Semifinal		Final	
Athlete	Event	Result	Rank	Result	Rank	Result	Rank	Result	Rank
Mustapha Kamel Selmi	100 metres	10.48	6	10.48	7	Did not advance			
Mustapha Kamel Selmi	200 metres	21.14	4	21.26	7	Did not advance			
Reda Abdenouz	800 metres	1:49.22	7	1:48.96	8	Did not advance			
Abdelwahab Ferguene	20 km Walk							1:34.26	35

Field events

Athlete	Event	Qualification		Final	
Athlete	Event	Distance	Position	Distance	Position
Othmane Belfaa	High jump	2.15	26	Did not advance	

=== 1991 ===
Algeria competed at the 1991 World Championships in Athletics in Tokyo, Japan, from 23 August to 1 September 1991. Algeria participated with 11 athletes.

Men
400 m	Amar Hacini
800 m	Reda Abdenouz, Ahmed Belkessam
1500 m	Noureddine Morceli
5000 m	Yahia Azaidj
Marathon	Mohamed Kamel Selmi
3000 m Steepleschase	Azzedine Brahmi
Long Jump	Lotfi Khaida
Triple Jump	Lotfi Khaida
High Jump	Othmane Belfaa

Women
1500 m	Hassiba Boulmerka
100 m Hurdles	Yasmina Azzizi-Kettab
Heptathlon	Yasmina Azzizi-Kettab

==== Medalists ====
Medal	Athlete	Event	Date
Gold	Hassiba Boulmerka	Women's 1500 metres	31 August
Gold	Noureddine Morceli	Men's 1500 metres	1 September
Bronze	Azzedine Brahmi	Men's 3000 metres steeplechase	31 August

==== Men ====
Track and road events

Athlete	Event	Heat		Quarterfinal		Semifinal		Final	
Athlete	Event	Result	Rank	Result	Rank	Result	Rank	Result	Rank
Amar Hacini	400 metres	46.52	5	47.30	7	Did not advance			
Reda Abdenouz	800 metres	1:50.47	4	—N/a		Did not advance			
Ahmed Belkessam	800 metres	1:47.06	3	—N/a		Did not advance			
Noureddine Morceli	1500 metres	3:43.45	1	—N/a		3:39.90	1	3:32.84	1st place, gold medalist(s)
Yahia Azaidj	5000 metres	14:43.49	12	—N/a				Did not advance	
Mohamed Kamel Selmi	Marathon	—N/a						—	DNF
Azzedine Brahmi	3000 m Steepleschase	8:27.95	2	—N/a				8:15.54	3rd place, bronze medalist(s)

Field events

Athlete	Event	Qualification		Final	
Athlete	Event	Distance	Position	Distance	Position
Lotfi Khaida	Long jump	7.68	18	Did not advance	
Lotfi Khaida	Triple jump	16.54	11	Did not advance	
Othmane Belfaa	High jump	2.24	15	Did not advance	

==== Women ====
Track and road events

Athlete	Event	Heat		Semifinal		Final	
Athlete	Event	Result	Rank	Result	Rank	Result	Rank
Hassiba Boulmerka	1500 metres	4:08.20	1	—N/a		4:02.21	1st place, gold medalist(s)
Yasmina Azzizi-Kettab	100 m Hurdles	–	DNS	Did not advance			

Combined events – Heptathlon

Athlete	Event	100H	HJ	SP	200 m	LJ	JT	800 m	Final	Rank
Yasmina Azzizi-Kettab	Result	13.34	1.79	15.40	24.32	6.15	44.62	2:17.17	6392	5
Yasmina Azzizi-Kettab	Points	1074	966	888	950	896	756	862	6392	5

=== 1993 ===
Algeria competed at the 1993 World Championships in Athletics in Stuttgart, Germany, from 13 to 22 August 1993. Algeria participated with 17 athletes.

Men
200 m	Amar Hacini
400 m	Sadek Boumendil
1500 m	Noureddine Morceli
5000 m	Aïssa Belaout
Marathon	Sid-Ali Sakhri, Chaouki Achour, Mohamed Kamel Selmi
110 m Hurdles	Noureddine Tadjine
3000 m Steepleschase	Azzedine Brahmi
20 km Walk	Abdelwahab Ferguene
4 × 400 m Relay	(Amar Hacini, Ismail Mariche, Kamel Talhaodi, Sadek Boumendil)
Long Jump	Lotfi Khaida
Triple Jump	Lotfi Khaida
High Jump	Othmane Belfaa
Hammer Throw	Hakim Toumi

Women
1500 m	Hassiba Boulmerka
10 km Walk	Dounia Kara

==== Medalists ====
Medal	Athlete	Event	Date
Gold	Noureddine Morceli	Men's 1500 metres	22 August
Bronze	Hassiba Boulmerka	Women's 1500 metres	22 August

==== Men ====
Track and road events

Athlete	Event	Heat		Quarterfinal		Semifinal		Final	
Athlete	Event	Result	Rank	Result	Rank	Result	Rank	Result	Rank
Amar Hacini	200 metres	21.36	6	Did not advance					
Sadek Boumendil	400 metres	46.37	4	45.91	6	Did not advance			
Noureddine Morceli	1500 metres	3:37.84	1	—N/a		3:40.07	1	3:34.24	1st place, gold medalist(s)
Aïssa Belaout	5000 metres	13:29.12	4	—N/a				DNF	—
Sid-Ali Sakhri	Marathon	—N/a						2:24:35	23
Chaouki Achour	Marathon	—N/a						DNF	—
Mohamed Kamel Selmi	Marathon	—N/a						DNF	—
Noureddine Tadjine	110 m Hurdles	14.50	8	—N/a		Did not advance			
Azzedine Brahmi	3000 m Steeplechase	8:24.73	2	—N/a				DNF	—
Abdelwahab Ferguene	20 km Walk	—N/a						1:35:48	34
Amar Hacini; Ismail Mariche; Kamel Talhaodi; Sadek Boumendil	4 × 400 m Relay	3:03.63	4	—N/a				Did not advance	

=== 1995 ===
Algeria competed at the 1995 World Championships in Athletics in Gothenburg, Sweden, from 5 to 13 August 1995. Algeria participated with 8 athletes.

Men
400 m	Amar Hacini
1500 m	Noureddine Morceli
5000 m	Reda Benzine, Yahia Azaidj
Marathon	Sid-Ali Sakhri
3000 m Steepleschase	Mohamed Belabbes
Hammer Throw	Hakim Toumi

Women
1500 m	Hassiba Boulmerka

==== Medalists ====
Medal	Athlete	Event	Date
Gold	Hassiba Boulmerka	Women's 1500 metres	9 August
Gold	Noureddine Morceli	Men's 1500 metres	13 August

=== 1997 ===
Algeria competed at the 1997 World Championships in Athletics in Athens, Greece, from 1 to 10 August 1997. Algeria participated with 14 athletes.

==== Men ====
Men
200 m	Malik-Khaled Louahla
400 m	Samir-Adel Louahla
800 m	Adem Hecini
1500 m	Noureddine Morceli, Ahmed Krama, Ali Saïdi-Sief
Marathon	Azzedine Sakhri
400 m Hurdles	Nabil Selmi
3000 m Steepleschase	Abderrahmane Daas
4 × 400 m Relay	(Samir-Adel Louahla, Talhaodi Kamel, Malik-Khaled Louahla, Amar Hacini)
Hammer Throw	Hakim Toumi

==== Women ====
Women
800 m	Nouria Mérah-Benida
1500 m	Nouria Mérah-Benida

=== 1999 ===
Algeria competed at the 1999 World Championships in Athletics in Seville, Spain, from 20 to 29 August 1999. Algeria participated with 12 athletes.

==== Men ====
Men
200 m	Malik Louahla
800 m	Djabir Saïd-Guerni, Adem Hecini
1500 m	Noureddine Morceli, Ali Saïdi-Sief, Miloud Abaoub
10,000 m	Samir Moussaoui
Marathon	Azzedine Sakhri
3000 m Steepleschase	Laïd Bessou
High Jump	Abderrahmane Hammad

==== Women ====
Women
1500 m	Nouria Mérah-Benida
Long Jump	Baya Rahouli
Triple Jump	Baya Rahouli

==== Medalists ====
Medal	Athlete	Event	Date
Bronze	Djabir Saïd-Guerni	Men's 800 metres	29 August

=== 2001 ===
Algeria competed at the 2001 World Championships in Athletics in Edmonton, Canada, from 3 to 12 August 2001. Algeria participated with 12 athletes.

Men
400 m	Malik Louahla
800 m	Adem Hecini
1500 m	Mohamed Khaldi
5000 m	Ali Saïdi-Sief, Khoudir Aggoune, Samir Moussaoui
10,000 m	Kamal Kohil
Marathon	Azzedine Sakhri
3000 m Steepleschase	Laïd Bessou
High Jump	Abderrahmane Hammad

Women
1500 m	Nouria Merah-Benida
5000 m	Nasria Baghdad-Azaïdj

=== 2003 ===
Algeria competed at the 2003 World Championships in Athletics in Saint-Denis, France, from 23 to 31 August 2003. Algeria participated with 9 athletes.

Men
400 m	Malik Louahla
800 m	Djabir Saïd-Guerni
1500 m	Tarek Boukensa
5000 m	Khoudir Aggoune
Marathon	Rachid Ziar
3000 m Steepleschase	Abdelhakim Maazouz
High Jump	Abderrahmane Hammad

Women
5000 m	Souad Aït Salem
Triple Jump	Baya Rahouli

==== Medalists ====
Medal	Athlete	Event	Date
Gold	Djabir Saïd-Guerni	Men's 800 metres	31 August

=== 2005 ===
Algeria competed at the 2005 World Championships in Athletics in Helsinki, Finland, from 6 to 14 August 2005. Algeria participated with 10 athletes.

Men
800 m	Djabir Saïd-Guerni
1500 m	Tarek Boukensa, Antar Zerguelaine, Kamal Boulahfane
5000 m	Ali Saïdi-Sief
Marathon	Saïd Belhout
Long Jump	Issam Nima

Women
800 m	Nahida Touhami
1500 m	Nahida Touhami
3000 m Steeplechase	Fatiha Bahi Azzouhoum
Triple Jump	Baya Rahouli

=== 2007 ===
Algeria competed at the 2007 World Championships in Athletics in Osaka, Japan, from 24 August to 2 September 2007. Algeria participated with 11 athletes.

Men
800 m	Nabil Madi
1500 m	Tarek Boukensa, Kamal Boulahfane, Antar Zerguelaine
3000 m Steepleschase	Rabie Makhloufi
5000 m	Khoudir Aggoune
Marathon	Nabil Benkrama
High Jump	Abderrahmane Hammad
Long Jump	Issam Nima

Women
1500 m	Nahida Touhami
Marathon	Souad Aït Salem

=== 2009 ===
Algeria fielded six competitors at the 2009 World Championships in Athletics in Berlin.

Event	Athletes	
Event	Men	Women
800 metres	Nadjim Manseur	Women did not participate
1500 metres	Tarek Boukensa; Taoufik Makhloufi; Imad Touil; Antar Zerguelaine	Women did not participate
Decathlon	Larbi Bouraada	Women did not participate

==== Men ====
Event	Athletes	Heats		Semifinal		Final	
Event	Athletes	Result	Rank	Result	Rank	Result	Rank
800 m	Nadjim Manseur	DNS		did not advance			
1500 m	Tarek Boukensa	3:45.65	38	did not advance			
1500 m	Taoufik Makhloufi	3:40.04	9 q	3:37.87	17	did not advance	
1500 m	Imad Touil	DNS		did not advance			
1500 m	Antar Zerguelaine	3:42.37	17	did not advance			
Decathlon	Larbi Bouraada	-				8,171	13

=== 2011 ===
Algeria competed at the 2011 World Championships in Athletics from August 27 to September 4 in Daegu, South Korea. The Fédération Algérienne d’Athlétisme announced a team of 10 athletes to represent the country in the event.

==== Men ====
Athlete	Event	Preliminaries		Heats		Semifinals		Final	
Athlete	Event	Time Width Height	Rank	Time Width Height	Rank	Time Width Height	Rank	Time Width Height	Rank
Mahfoud Brahimi	800 metres			1:46.94	21 q	1:46.79	18	Did not advance	
Tarek Boukensa	1500 metres			3:41.87	23 Q	3:36.84	2 Q	3:38.05	11
Taoufik Makhloufi	1500 metres			3:40.15	12 Q	3:50.86	24	Did not Advance	
Rabah Aboud	5000 metres			14:00.34	29			Did not Advance	
Mounir Mihout	5000 metres			DNF	NA			Did not Advance	
Othmane Hadj Lazib	110 m hurdles			13.63	21	Did not advance			
Seif Islam Temacini	Triple jump	NM	–					Did not advance	

Decathlon

Larbi Bouraâda	Decathlon			
Larbi Bouraâda	Event	Results	Points	Rank
	100 m	10.88 (SB)	888	12
	Long jump	7.42 (SB)	915	6
	Shot put	13.11 (SB)	674	25
	High jump	1.96	767	18
	400 m	47.34 (SB)	941	2
	110 m hurdles	14.56 (SB)	903	12
	Discus throw	37.84	621	24
	Pole vault	4.90 (PB)	880	10
	Javelin throw	59.00 (SB)	723	11
	1500 m	4:14.97 (SB)	846	1
Total			8158	10

==== Women ====
Athlete	Event	Preliminaries		Heats		Semifinals		Final	
Athlete	Event	Time Width Height	Rank	Time Width Height	Rank	Time Width Height	Rank	Time Width Height	Rank
Zehra Bouras	800 metres			2:02.77	22 Q	2:12.08	23	Did not advance	
Baya Rahouli	Triple jump	14.30	8 q					14.12	8

=== 2013 ===
Algeria competed at the 2013 World Championships in Athletics in Moscow, Russia, from 10–18 August 2013. A team of 11 athletes was announced to represent the country in the event.

(q – qualified, NM – no mark, SB – season best)

==== Men ====
Track and road events

Athlete	Event	Preliminaries		Heats		Semifinals		Final	
Athlete	Event	Time	Rank	Time	Rank	Time	Rank	Time	Rank
Amine Belferar	800 metres			1:47.17	24	did not advance			
Imed Touil	1500 metres			DNS	DNS	did not advance			
Miloud Rahmani	400 metres hurdles			50.79	30	did not advance			
Hicham Bouchicha	3000 metres steeplechase			8.28.56	20			did not advance	
Abdelmadjed Touil	3000 metres steeplechase			8:25.89	17			did not advance	
Abdelhamid Zerrifi	3000 metres steeplechase			DQ	DQ			did not advance	
Tayeb Filali	Marathon							DNF	-

==== Women ====
Track and road events

Athlete	Event	Preliminaries		Heats		Semifinals		Final	
Athlete	Event	Time	Rank	Time	Rank	Time	Rank	Time	Rank
Amina Bettiche	3000 metres steeplechase			9:45.50	17			did not advance	

Field events

Athlete	Event	Preliminaries		Final	
Athlete	Event	Width Height	Rank	Width Height	Rank
Baya Rahouli	Triple jump	13.41	17	did not advance	

Heptathlon

Heptathlon
Athlete	Event	Results	Points	Rank
Yasmina Omrani	100 m hurdles	13.57 PB	1040	11
Yasmina Omrani	High jump	1.77 SB	941	15
Yasmina Omrani	Shot put	13.32	749	14
Yasmina Omrani	200 m	24.75 SB	910	12
Yasmina Omrani	Long jump	5.82	795	22
Yasmina Omrani	Javelin throw	39.26	653	24
Yasmina Omrani	800 m	2:14.81 SB	895	15
Yasmina Omrani	Total		5983 PB	19

=== 2015 ===
Algeria competed at the 2015 World Championships in Athletics in Beijing, China, from 22 to 30 August 2015.

(q – qualified, NM – no mark, SB – season best)

==== Men ====
Track and road events

Athlete	Event	Heat		Semifinal		Final	
Athlete	Event	Result	Rank	Result	Rank	Result	Rank
Khalid Benmahdi	800 metres	1:49.61	40	Did not advance			
Yassine Hathat	1500 metres	3:40.16	20	Did not advance			
Taoufik Makhloufi	1500 metres	3:42.72	24 Q	3:35.05	2 Q	3:34.76	4
Salim Keddar	1500 metres	3:44.81	34	Did not advance			
Saber Boukemouche	400 m hurdles	51.54	38	Did not advance			
Abdelmalik Lahoulou	400 m hurdles	49.33	19 q	48.87 NR	14	Did not advance	
Miloud Rahmani	400 m hurdles	50.21	35	Did not advance			
Hicham Bouchicha	3000 m steeplechase	8:30.07	12 q	—N/a		8:33.79	14
Bilal Tabti	3000 m steeplechase	8:26.99	8 Q	—N/a		8:29.04	13
Abdelhamid Zerrifi	3000 m steeplechase	8:51.89	28	—N/a		Did not advance	

Combined events – Decathlon

Athlete	Event	100 m	LJ	SP	HJ	400 m	110H	DT	PV	JT	1500 m	Final	Rank
Larbi Bourrada	Result	10.83 SB	7.51 SB	13.73 SB	2.07 SB	47.60 SB	14.26 PB	41.53 PB	4.80 SB	63.82 SB	4:16.61 SB	8461 AR	5
Larbi Bourrada	Points	899	937	712	868	929	941	696	849	795	835	8461 AR	5

==== Women ====
Track and road events

Athlete	Event	Heat		Semifinal		Final	
Athlete	Event	Result	Rank	Result	Rank	Result	Rank
Souad Aït Salem	Marathon	—N/a				DNF	
Barkahoum Drici	Marathon	—N/a				DNF	
Amina Bettiche	3000 m steeplechase	9:36.10 SB	18	—N/a		Did not advance	

=== 2017 ===
Algeria competed at the 2017 World Championships in Athletics in London, United Kingdom, from 4–13 August 2017.

(q – qualified, NM – no mark, SB – season best)

==== Men ====
Track and road events

Athlete	Event	Heat		Semifinal		Final	
Athlete	Event	Result	Rank	Result	Rank	Result	Rank
Amine Belferar	800 metres	DNF	–	Did not advance			
Abderrahmane Anou	1500 metres	3:47.38	35	Did not advance			
Hicham Bouchicha	3000 m steeplechase	8:30.01	20	—N/a		Did not advance	
Bilal Tabti	3000 m steeplechase	8:23.28	9 q	—N/a		DQ	–
Abdelmalik Lahoulou	400 metres hurdles	49.78	17 Q	49.33	10	Did not advance	

Combined events – Decathlon

Athlete	Event	100 m	LJ	SP	HJ	400 m	110H	DT	PV	JT	1500 m	Final	Rank
Larbi Bourrada	Result	10.80 SB	7.22	13.41 SB	1.90	DNS	–	–	–	–	–	DNF	–
Larbi Bourrada	Points	906	866	692	714	0						DNF	–

==== Women ====
Track and road events

Athlete	Event	Heat		Semifinal		Final	
Athlete	Event	Result	Rank	Result	Rank	Result	Rank
Amina Bettiche	3000 m steeplechase	9:53.06	28	—N/a		Did not advance	
Kenza Dahmani	Marathon	—N/a				DNF	–

=== 2019 ===
Algeria competed at the 2019 World Athletics Championships in Doha, Qatar, from 27 September to 6 October 2019. Six athletes represented Algeria at the event.

==== Men ====
Track and road events

Athlete	Event	Heat		Semifinal		Final	
Athlete	Event	Result	Rank	Result	Rank	Result	Rank
Mohamed Belbachir	800 metres	1:46.52	25	Did not advance			
Yassine Hethat	800 metres	1:45.67	7 q	1:46.15	17	Did not advance	
Taoufik Makhloufi	1500 metres	3:36.18	2 Q	3:36.69	6 Q	3:31.38 SB	2nd place, silver medalist(s)
Abdelmalik Lahoulou	400 metres hurdles	49.54	8 Q	48.39 NR	4 Q	49.46	8
Bilal Tabti	3000 metres steeplechase	8:35.15	34	—N/a		Did not advance	

Field events

Athlete	Event	Qualification		Final	
Athlete	Event	Result	Rank	Result	Rank
Yasser Mohamed Triki	Triple jump	16.62	20	Did not advance	

=== 2022 ===
Algeria competed at the 2022 World Athletics Championships in Eugene, United States, from 15 to 24 July 2022. Algeria has entered 8 athletes (Yasser Triki did not participate due to injury).

- including alternates

==== Men ====
Track and road events

Athlete	Event	Heat		Semi-final		Final	
Athlete	Event	Result	Rank	Result	Rank	Result	Rank
Yassine Hethat	800 metres	1:46.05	16	did not advance			
Slimane Moula	800 metres	1:44.90	5 Q	1:44.89	1 Q	1:44.85	5
Djamel Sedjati	800 metres	1:46.39	20 Q	1:45.44	5 Q	1:44.14	2nd place, silver medalist(s)
Amine Bouanani	110 metres hurdles	13.44	10 Q	13.37 NR	12	did not advance	
Abdelmalik Lahoulou	400 metres hurdles	49.58	12 Q	48.90	10	did not advance	
Hichem Bouchicha	3000 metres steeplechase	8:27.39	25	—N/a		did not advance	
Bilal Tabti	3000 metres steeplechase	8:38.45	34	—N/a		did not advance	
