= Algeria at the 2023 World Athletics Championships =

- Flag of Algeria
- WA code: ALG

in Budapest, Hungary 19 August 2023 – 27 August 2023
- Competitors: 10 (9 men and 1 woman) in 8 events
- Medals: Gold 0 Silver 0 Bronze 0 Total 0

World Athletics Championships appearances (overview)
- 1983; 1987; 1991; 1993; 1995; 1997; 1999; 2001; 2003; 2005; 2007; 2009; 2011; 2013; 2015; 2017; 2019; 2022; 2023; 2025

Algeria competed at the 2023 World Athletics Championships in Budapest, Hungary, from 19 to 27 August 2023.

== Results ==
Algeria entered 10 athletes.

Key

- Q = Qualified for the next round
- q = Qualified for the next round as a fastest loser or, in field events, by position without achieving the qualifying target
- NR = National record
- PB = Personal best
- SB = Season best
- N/A = Round not applicable for the event

=== Men ===
Track and road events

Athlete	Event	Heat		Semifinal		Final	
Athlete	Event	Result	Rank	Result	Rank	Result	Rank
Mohamed Ali Gouaned	800 metres	1:49.16	6	Did not advance			
Slimane Moula	800 metres	1:45.76	3 Q	1:43.93	1 Q	1:44.95	5
Djamel Sedjati	800 metres	1:47.87	2 Q	1:44.49	2 Q	DQ	
Salim Keddar	1500 metres	3:35.17	8	Did not advance			
Amine Bouanani	110 metres hurdles	13.90	8	Did not advance			
Abdelmalik Lahoulou	400 metres hurdles	DNF		Did not advance			

Field events

Athlete	Event	Qualification		Final	
Athlete	Event	Distance	Position	Distance	Position
Hichem Bouhanoun	High jump	2.14	32	Did not advance	
Yasser Triki	Triple jump	16.95	6 q	17.01	5

Combined events – Decathlon

Athlete	Event	100 m	LJ	SP	HJ	400 m	110H	DT	PV	JT	1500 m	Final	Rank
Larbi Bourrada	Result	11.01 SB	7.09	12.44 SB	DNF								
Larbi Bourrada	Points	858	835	633	DNF								

=== Women ===
Track and road events

Athlete	Event	Final	
Athlete	Event	Result	Rank
Amina Bettiche	Marathon	DNF	
