= Athletics at the 2011 Summer Universiade – Men's 1500 metres =

The men's 1500 metres event at the 2011 Summer Universiade was held on 16–18 August.

== Medalists ==
Gold	Silver	Bronze
Imad Touil; Algeria	Abdelmadjed Touil; Algeria	Valentin Smirnov; Russia

== Results ==
=== Heats ===
Qualification: First 3 in each heat (Q) and the next 3 fastest (q) qualified for the final.

Rank	Heat	Name	Nationality	Time	Notes
1	3	Abdelmadjed Touil	Algeria	3:42.68	Q
2	3	Teng Haining	China	3:42.93	Q, PB
3	3	Valentin Smirnov	Russia	3:43.18	Q
4	3	Diego Borrego	Mexico	3:43.25	q
5	3	Hamish Carson	New Zealand	3:43.55	q
6	3	Dmitrijs Jurkevičs	Latvia	3:43.72	q
7	3	Brenton Rowe	Austria	3:44.30	
8	3	James Nipperess	Australia	3:47.24	
9	3	Roman Fosti	Estonia	3:47.34	
10	3	Moslem Niadoost	Iran	3:48.93	PB
11	2	Artur Ostrowski	Poland	3:49.26	Q
12	2	David Bishop	Great Britain	3:49.40	Q
13	2	Pharson Magagane	South Africa	3:49.61	Q
14	2	Anthony Berkis	Canada	3:49.64	
15	3	Zouhir Sadden	Morocco	3:49.89	
16	3	Jironi Riduan	Malaysia	3:50.33	
17	2	Ivan Obezchik	Kazakhstan	3:50.43	
18	2	Malcolm Hicks	New Zealand	3:50.76	
19	2	Liu Huawei	China	3:52.46	
20	2	Merab Kinidze	Georgia	3:52.54	
21	1	Imad Touil	Algeria	3:53.29	Q
22	1	Vyacheslav Sokolov	Russia	3:53.63	Q
23	1	Kris Gauson	Great Britain	3:53.68	Q
24	1	Szymon Krawczyk	Poland	3:53.72	
25	1	Nikolai Vedehin	Estonia	3:54.69	
26	1	Cihat Ulus	Turkey	3:54.97	
27	1	Mitja Krevs	Slovenia	3:55.34	
28	1	Alex Ngouari Mouissi	Republic of the Congo	3:57.62	
29	2	Benjamin Njia	Uganda	3:58.16	
30	1	Mervin Guarte	Philippines	3:59.39	
31	2	Ali Hulayyil Alboqami	Saudi Arabia	4:12.68	
32	3	Pjeter Ndoj	Albania	4:19.30	
33	1	Charlton Sunter	Netherlands Antilles	4:22.92	
34	1	Rachid Idriss	Lebanon	4:46.71	
	2	Sajjad Moradi	Iran	DNF	
	2	Oleksandr Osmolovych	Ukraine	DNF	
	1	Johan Hyden	Sweden	DNS	
	2	Stephon Josiah	Guyana	DNS	

=== Final ===
Official Video

Rank	Name	Nationality	Time	Notes
1st place, gold medalist(s)	Imad Touil	Algeria	3:48.13	
2nd place, silver medalist(s)	Abdelmadjed Touil	Algeria	3:48.24	
3rd place, bronze medalist(s)	Valentin Smirnov	Russia	3:48.45	
4	Teng Haining	China	3:48.71	
5	Artur Ostrowski	Poland	3:48.81	
6	Dmitrijs Jurkevičs	Latvia	3:49.35	
7	David Bishop	Great Britain	3:49.61	
8	Kris Gauson	Great Britain	3:49.84	
9	Vyacheslav Sokolov	Russia	3:50.51	
10	Hamish Carson	New Zealand	3:50.56	
11	Diego Borrego	Mexico	3:52.33	
12	Pharson Magagane	South Africa	3:53.81	
