= Athletics at the 2013 Mediterranean Games =

- Dates: 26 – 29 June
- Host city: Mersin, Turkey
- Venue: Nevin Yanıt Athletics Complex
- Events: 43 + 1 disability
- Participation: 319 (+disability) athletes from 23 nations

The athletics competitions at the 2013 Mediterranean Games in Mersin took place between 26 June and 29 June at the Nevin Yanıt Athletics Complex while half marathons were held at the Adnan Menderes Boulevard.

Athletes competed in 43 events and 1 paralympic event. Men's 20 km walk, men's decathlon, women's shot put and women's 1500m T54 were cancelled.

== Medal table ==
* Host nation (Turkey)

Rank	Nation	Gold	Silver	Bronze	Total
1	Italy	13	5	9	27
2	Greece	6	4	6	16
3	Turkey*	5	7	7	19
4	France	4	2	5	11
5	Algeria	4	2	4	10
6	Morocco	3	7	4	14
7	Croatia	3	1	0	4
8	Cyprus	2	1	1	4
9	Spain	1	5	2	8
10	Egypt	1	3	1	5
11	Slovenia	1	2	1	4
12	Serbia	1	2	0	3
13	Tunisia	1	1	1	3
14	Albania	0	1	0	1
15	Bosnia and Herzegovina	0	0	1	1
15	Montenegro	0	0	1	1
Totals (16 entries)		45	43	43	131

== Medal summary ==
=== Men's events ===
Event	Gold		Silver		Bronze	
100 metres	Emmanuel Biron; France	10.22	Ramil Guliyev; Turkey	10.23	Michael Tumi; Italy	10.25
200 metres	Lykourgos Tsakonas; Greece	20.45	Ramil Guliyev; Turkey	20.46	Sergio Ruiz Serrano; Spain	20.74
400 metres	Matteo Galvan; Italy	45.59	Anas Beshr; Egypt	45.79	Mame-Ibra Anne; France	45.81
800 metres	İlham Tanui Özbilen; Turkey	1:44.00 GR	Samir Jamaa; Morocco	1:45.47	Mohamed Ahmed Hamada; Egypt	1:45.71
1500 metres	İlham Tanui Özbilen; Turkey	3:35.09	Yassine Bensghir; Morocco	3:36.49	Imad Touil; Algeria	3:36.71
5000 metres	Rabah Aboud; Algeria	13:38.01	Othmane El Goumri; Morocco	13:38.24	Aziz Lahbabi; Morocco	13:40.33
10,000 metres	Polat Kemboi Arıkan; Turkey	28:17.26	Aziz Lahbabi; Morocco	28:55.24	Soufiyan Bouqantar; Morocco	28:57.22
110 metres hurdles	Konstadinos Douvalidis; Greece	13.45 GR	Thomas Martinot-Lagarde; France	13.48	Othmane Hadj Lazib; Algeria	13.61
400 metres hurdles	Emir Bekrić; Serbia	48.83 GR	Miloud Rahmani; Algeria	49.34	Hugo Grillas; France	49.92
3000 metres steeplechase	Amor Ben Yahia; Tunisia	8:14.05	Tarık Langat Akdağ; Turkey	8:20.08	Hamid Ezzine; Morocco	8:21.03
4×100 metres relay	Italy (ITA); Simone Collio; Davide Manenti; Jacques Riparelli; Michael Tumi	39.06	Greece (GRE); Efthymios Stergioulis; Christos Kalamaras; Emmanouil Paterakis; Panagiotis Andreadis	40.22	Turkey (TUR); Ismail Aslan; Ferhat Altunkalem; İzzet Safer; Umutcan Emektas	40.82
4×400 metres relay	Italy (ITA); Lorenzo Valentini; Isalbet Juarez; Michele Tricca; Matteo Galvan	3:04.61	Turkey (TUR); Mehmet Guzel; Bugrahan Kocebeyoglu; Halit Kiliç; Yavuz Can	3:05.28	Greece (GRE); Dimitrios Gravalos; Petros Kyriakidis; Periklis Iakovakis; Konstantinos Nakopoulos	3:07.36
Half marathon	Ruggero Pertile; Italy	1:07:07	Wissem Hosni; Tunisia	1:08:32	Muzaffer Bayram; Turkey	1:09:40
High jump	Konstadinos Baniotis; Greece	2.34 m GR	Silvano Chesani; Italy	2.28 m	Fabrice Saint-Jean; France	2.24 m
Pole vault	Giuseppe Gibilisco; Italy	5.70 m GR	Kévin Menaldo; France	5.60 m	Giorgio Piantella; Italy	5.50 m
Long jump	Louis Tsatoumas; Greece	8.14 m	Georgios Tsakonas; Greece	7.97 m	Emanuele Catania; Italy	7.92 m
Triple jump	Daniele Greco; Italy	17.13 m	Dimitrios Tsiamis; Greece	17.00 m	Fabrizio Schembri; Italy	16.62 m
Shot put	Borja Vivas; Spain	19.99 m	Marin Premeru; Croatia	19.72 m	Hamza Alić; Bosnia and Herzegovina	19.69 m
Discus throw	Martin Marić; Croatia	61.46 m	Ercüment Olgundeniz; Turkey	61.46 m	Danijel Furtula; Montenegro	61.44 m
Hammer throw	Mostafa El Gamel; Egypt	76.68 m	Hassan Mohamed Mahmoud; Egypt	74.96 m	Nicola Vizzoni; Italy	74.86 m
Javelin throw	Fatih Avan; Turkey	83.84 m	Ihab Abdelrahman; Egypt	82.45 m	Spyridon Lebesis; Greece	78.53 m

=== Women's events ===
Event	Gold		Silver		Bronze	
100 metres	Ilenia Draisci; Italy	11.53	Estela García; Spain	11.53	Eleni Artymata; Cyprus	11.55
200 metres	Eleni Artymata; Cyprus	23.18	Libania Grenot; Italy	23.20	Nimet Karakuş; Turkey	23.40
400 metres	Chiara Bazzoni; Italy	52.06	Maria Benedicta Chigbolu; Italy	52.66	Agnès Raharolahy; France	52.90
800 metres	Malika Akkaoui; Morocco	2:00.72	Siham Hilali; Morocco	2:00.79	Tuğba Karakaya; Turkey	2:01.74
1500 metres	Siham Hilali; Morocco	4:04.06	Luiza Gega; Albania	4:05.63	Tuğba Karakaya; Turkey	4:06.22
5000 metres	Christine Bardelle; France	15:39.64	Silvia Weissteiner; Italy	15:44.53	Elena Romagnolo; Italy	16:11.17
10,000 metres	Kenza Dahmani; Algeria	32:42.47	Elvan Abeylegesse; Turkey	32:59.30	Souad Aït Salem; Algeria	33:19.34
100 metres hurdles	Marzia Caravelli; Italy	12.92	Veronica Borsi; Italy	13.05	Marina Tomić; Slovenia	13.11
400 metres hurdles	Hayat Lambarki; Morocco	55.27	Lamiae Lhabze; Morocco	55.51	Manuela Gentili; Italy	55.89
3000 metres steeplechase	Amina Bettiche; Algeria	9:40.71 GR	Salima El Ouali Alami; Morocco	9:43.71	[[]] Morocco	-
4×100 metres relay	Italy (ITA); Audrey Alloh; Ilenia Draisci; Jessica Paoletta; Micol Cattaneo	44.66	Cyprus (CYP); Paraskevi Andreou; Ramona Papaioannou; Dimitra Kyriakidou; Eleni Artymata	44.79	Greece (GRE); Maria Gatou; Agni Derveni; Olympia Petsoudi; Grigoria Keramida	45.12
4×400 metres relay	Italy (ITA); Maria Enrica Spacca; Elena Maria Bonfanti; Maria Benedicta Chigbolu; Chiara Bazzoni	3:32.44	Turkey (TUR); Saliha Ozyurt; Birsen Engin; Sema Apak; Derya Yildirim	3:43.61		
Half marathon	Valeria Straneo; Italy	1:11:00 GR	Souad Aït Salem; Algeria	1:13:54	Ümmü Kiraz; Turkey	1:16:51
20 kilometres walk	Eleonora Giorgi; Italy	1:39:13	Raquel González Campos; Spain	1:41:08	Antigoni Drisbioti; Greece	1:41:53
High jump	Ana Šimić; Croatia; Burcu Ayhan Yüksel; Turkey	1.92 m			Antonia Stergiou; Greece	1.90 m
Pole vault	Stella-Iro Ledaki; Greece	4.50 m =GR	Naroa Agirre; Spain	4.40 m	Marion Buisson; France	4.40 m
Long jump	Nektaria Panagi; Cyprus	6.51 m	Nina Kolarič; Slovenia	6.49 m	Tania Vicenzino; Italy	6.38 m
Triple jump	Athanasia Perra; Greece	14.48 m	Snežana Rodič; Slovenia	14.36 m	Baya Rahouli; Algeria	14.04 m
Discus throw	Sandra Perković; Croatia	66.21 m	Dragana Tomašević; Serbia	61.88 m	Chrysoula Anagnostopoulou; Greece	55.01 m
Hammer throw	Jessika Guehaseim; France	67.14 m	Berta Castells; Spain	66.16 m	Silvia Salis; Italy	62.52 m
Javelin throw	Martina Ratej; Slovenia	60.28 m	Tatjana Jelača; Serbia	57.88 m	Nora Aída Bicet; Spain	57.65 m
Heptathlon	Yasmina Omrani; Algeria	5802 pts	Sofia Yfantidou; Greece	5752 pts	Serpil Kocak; Turkey	5158 pts

=== Paralympic events ===
Event	Gold		Silver		Bronze	
Men's 1500 metres T54	Julien Casoli; France	3:26.66	Roger Puigbò; Spain	3:26.70	Yassine Gharbi; Tunisia	3:26.81

== Participating nations ==
- Albania (2)
- Algeria (17)
- Andorra (2)
- Bosnia and Herzegovina (5)
- Croatia (4)
- Cyprus (12)
- Egypt (8)
- France (36)
- Greece (34)
- Italy (57)
- Lebanon (2)
- Libya (4)
- Macedonia (2)
- Monaco (1)
- Montenegro (2)
- Morocco (26)
- San Marino (1)
- Serbia (8)
- Slovenia (12)
- Spain (19)
- Syria (1)
- Tunisia (3)
- Turkey (60)

== Doping cases ==
On 6 March 2015 IAAF announced that Moroccan Ahmed Baday who originally won gold medal in half marathon event had been suspended for two years for a biological passport anti-doping rule violation. His results from 26 March 2010 and onwards were annulled and get back his gold medal.

== Men's results ==
=== 100 metres ===
Heats – 27 June
Wind:
Heat 1: +0.2 m/s, Heat 2: +0.4 m/s

Rank	Heat	Name	Nationality	Time	Notes
1	2	Emmanuel Biron	France	10.30	Q, SB
2	2	Jacques Riparelli	Italy	10.38	Q
3	2	Aziz Ouhadi	Morocco	10.41	Q
4	2	Ramil Guliyev	Turkey	10.43	q, SB
5	1	Michael Tumi	Italy	10.49	Q
6	2	Amr Seoud	Egypt	10.50	q
7	1	Bemba Kaba	France	10.52	Q
8	1	Efthimios Steryioulis	Greece	10.63	Q
9	2	Panagiotis Andreadis	Greece	10.67	
10	1	Umutcan Emektas	Turkey	10.68	
11	1	Panagiotis Ioannou	Cyprus	10.77	
12	1	Miloš Savić	Serbia	10.79	
13	1	Riste Pandev	Macedonia	10.93	
14	1	Mohamed Elshoushan	Libya	11.03	
15	2	Mikel de Sa	Andorra	11.46	

Final – 27 June
Wind:
+0.2 m/s

Rank	Lane	Name	Nationality	Time	Notes
1st place, gold medalist(s)	5	Emmanuel Biron	France	10.22	PB
2nd place, silver medalist(s)	7	Ramil Guliyev	Turkey	10.23	SB
3rd place, bronze medalist(s)	6	Michael Tumi	Italy	10.25	
4	2	Aziz Ouhadi	Morocco	10.27	SB
5	4	Jacques Riparelli	Italy	10.29	
6	1	Amr Seoud	Egypt	10.40	
7	3	Bemba Kaba	France	10.47	
8	8	Efthimios Steryioulis	Greece	10.52	

=== 200 metres ===
Heats – 26 June
Wind:
Heat 1: -0.4 m/s, Heat 2: -0.9 m/s

Rank	Heat	Name	Nationality	Time	Notes
1	2	Lykourgos-Stefanos Tsakonas	Greece	20.70	Q, SB
2	2	Amr Seoud	Egypt	20.71	Q
3	2	Davide Manenti	Italy	20.90	Q
4	1	Diego Marani	Italy	20.92	Q
5	1	Sergio Ruiz	Spain	20.94	Q
6	2	Ramil Guliyev	Turkey	20.97	q
7	1	Aziz Ouhadi	Morocco	21.09	Q
8	2	Pierre-Alexis Pessonneaux	France	21.20	q
9	1	Teddy Tinmar	France	21.26	
10	1	Emmanouil Paterakis	Greece	21.52	
11	2	Abdulfatah Elez	Libya	21.89	
12	1	Riste Pandev	Macedonia	22.04	PB

Final – 26 June
Wind:
-0.7 m/s

Rank	Lane	Name	Nationality	Time	Notes
1st place, gold medalist(s)	6	Lykourgos-Stefanos Tsakonas	Greece	20.45	PB
2nd place, silver medalist(s)	7	Ramil Guliyev	Turkey	20.46	SB
3rd place, bronze medalist(s)	3	Sergio Ruiz	Spain	20.74	
4	4	Diego Marani	Italy	20.78	
5	1	Aziz Ouhadi	Morocco	20.81	SB
6	5	Amr Seoud	Egypt	20.84	
7	2	Davide Manenti	Italy	20.86	
8	8	Pierre-Alexis Pessonneaux	France	21.30	

=== 400 metres ===
Heats – 27 June

Rank	Heat	Name	Nationality	Time	Notes
1	1	Mame-Ibra Anne	France	45.78	Q, PB
2	2	Anas Beshr	Egypt	46.25	Q
3	1	Yavuz Can	Turkey	46.53	Q, SB
4	1	Petros Kyriakidis	Greece	46.69	Q, SB
5	2	Matteo Galvan	Italy	46.73	Q
6	2	Mark Ujakpor	Spain	46.77	Q
7	1	Lorenzo Valentini	Italy	47.03	q
8	2	Dimitrios Gravalos	Greece	47.14	q, SB
9	2	Halit Kiliç	Turkey	48.15	
10	1	Kristijan Efremov	Macedonia	48.87	
	1	Abdulsalam Torkia	Libya	DQ	

Final – 28 June

Rank	Lane	Name	Nationality	Time	Notes
1st place, gold medalist(s)	6	Matteo Galvan	Italy	45.59	PB
2nd place, silver medalist(s)	5	Anas Beshr	Egypt	45.79	
3rd place, bronze medalist(s)	4	Mame-Ibra Anne	France	45.81	
4	7	Petros Kyriakidis	Greece	46.26	SB
5	2	Mark Ujakpor	Spain	46.53	
6	3	Yavuz Can	Turkey	46.70	
7	8	Dimitrios Gravalos	Greece	46.76	SB
8	1	Lorenzo Valentini	Italy	47.37	

=== 800 metres ===
Heats – 28 June

Rank	Heat	Name	Nationality	Time	Notes
1	2	İlham Tanui Özbilen	Turkey	1:46.50	Q
2	2	Amine El Manaoui	Morocco	1:46.66	Q
3	2	Hamada Mohamed	Egypt	1:46.88	Q, SB
4	2	Yassine Hathat	Algeria	1:47.33	q
5	1	Samir Jamaa	Morocco	1:47.55	Q
6	2	Azzedine Boudjemaa	France	1:47.63	q
7	1	Paul Renaudie	France	1:48.40	Q
8	1	Mohamed Benferrar	Algeria	1:48.53	Q
9	2	Konstantinos Nakopoulos	Greece	1:48.59	
10	1	Francisco Roldán	Spain	1:49.00	
11	1	Nemanja Kojić	Serbia	1:49.10	PB
12	1	Levent Ates	Turkey	1:50.17	
13	2	Brice Etès	Monaco	1:50.55	
14	1	Dušan Babić	Bosnia and Herzegovina	1:52.59	
15	1	Giordano Benedetti	Italy	1:53.60	

Final – 29 June

Rank	Name	Nationality	Time	Notes
1st place, gold medalist(s)	İlham Tanui Özbilen	Turkey	1:44.00	GR
2nd place, silver medalist(s)	Samir Jamaa	Morocco	1:45.47	PB
3rd place, bronze medalist(s)	Hamada Mohamed	Egypt	1:45.71	SB
4	Yassine Hathat	Algeria	1:46.26	PB
5	Paul Renaudie	France	1:46.84	
6	Mohamed Benferrar	Algeria	1:47.23	
7	Azzedine Boudjemaa	France	1:47.76	
	Amine El Manaoui	Morocco	DNF	

=== 1500 metres ===
27 June

Rank	Name	Nationality	Time	Notes
1st place, gold medalist(s)	İlham Tanui Özbilen	Turkey	3:35.09	SB
2nd place, silver medalist(s)	Yassine Bensghir	Morocco	3:36.42	
3rd place, bronze medalist(s)	Imad Touil	Algeria	3:36.71	
4	Abderrahmane Anou	Algeria	3:36.93	
5	Fouad Elkaam	Morocco	3:37.67	
6	Francisco Javier Abad	Spain	3:40.06	
7	Andreas Dimitrakis	Greece	3:40.15	PB
8	Bryan Cantero	France	3:40.77	
9	Merihun Crespi	Italy	3:41.19	SB
10	Levent Ates	Turkey	3:41.43	PB
	Mohamed Ahmed Hamada	Egypt	DNF	

=== 5000 metres ===
29 June

Rank	Name	Nationality	Time	Notes
1st place, gold medalist(s)	Rabah Aboud	Algeria	13:38.01	
2nd place, silver medalist(s)	Othmane El Goumri	Morocco	13:38.24	
3rd place, bronze medalist(s)	Aziz Lahbabi	Morocco	13:40.33	
4	Daniele Meucci	Italy	13:45.12	SB
5	Kemal Koyuncu	Turkey	14:29.75	
6	Mirko Petrović	Serbia	14:55.70	
	Stefano La Rosa	Italy	DNF	
	Halil Akkaş	Turkey	DNS	
	Ilir Kellezi	Albania	DNS	

=== 10,000 metres ===
29 June

Rank	Name	Nationality	Time	Notes
1st place, gold medalist(s)	Polat Kemboi Arıkan	Turkey	28:17.26	
2nd place, silver medalist(s)	Aziz Lahbabi	Morocco	28:55.24	
3rd place, bronze medalist(s)	Soufiyan Bouqantar	Morocco	28:57.82	
4	Ahmed El Mazoury	Italy	29:59.28	
5	Riad Guerfi	France	31:04.03	
6	Ilir Kellezi	Albania	33:29.09	
	Halil Akkaş	Turkey	DNF	

=== Half marathon ===
29 June

Rank	Name	Nationality	Time	Notes
1st place, gold medalist(s)	Ahmed Baday	Morocco	1:06:54	DQ on 1/09/15
2nd place, silver medalist(s)	Ruggero Pertile	Italy	1:07:07	
3rd place, bronze medalist(s)	Wissam Hosni	Tunisia	1:08:32	
4	Muzaffer Bayram	Turkey	1:09:40	
5	Ahmed Medjaher	Algeria	1:10:02	
6	Andrea Lalli	Italy	1:10:11	
7	Slimane Moulay	Algeria	1:11:37	
8	Mehmet Çağlayan	Turkey	1:11:54	
	Hicham Bellani	Morocco	DNF	
	Mitja Kosovelj	Slovenia	DNF	
	Hasan Pak	Turkey	DNF	

=== 110 metres hurdles ===
Heats – 26 June
Wind:
Heat 1: -0.6 m/s, Heat 2: -1.5 m/s

Rank	Heat	Name	Nationality	Time	Notes
1	1	Konstadinos Douvalidis	Greece	13.52	Q, CR
2	1	Thomas Martinot-Lagarde	France	13.53	Q
3	2	Dimitri Bascou	France	13.78	Q
4	1	Jackson Quiñónez	Spain	13.99	Q
5	2	Othmane Hadj Lazib	Algeria	14.10	Q
6	1	Ahmad Hazer	Lebanon	14.19	q
7	1	Mustafa Güneş	Turkey	14.23	q
8	2	Milan Ristić	Serbia	14.41	Q
	2	Emanuele Abate	Italy	DNS	

Final – 26 June
Wind:
-0.8 m/s

Rank	Lane	Name	Nationality	Time	Notes
1st place, gold medalist(s)	6	Konstadinos Douvalidis	Greece	13.45	GR
2nd place, silver medalist(s)	5	Thomas Martinot-Lagarde	France	13.48	
3rd place, bronze medalist(s)	4	Othmane Hadj Lazib	Algeria	13.61	
4	3	Dimitri Bascou	France	13.93	
5	1	Ahmad Hazer	Lebanon	14.13	
6	7	Milan Ristić	Serbia	14.13	
7	8	Mustafa Güneş	Turkey	14.19	
	2	Jackson Quiñónez	Spain	DNS	

=== 400 metres hurdles ===
Heats – 28 June

Rank	Heat	Name	Nationality	Time	Notes
1	1	Hugo Grillas	France	49.96	Q, SB
2	2	Diego Cabello	Spain	50.15	Q
3	1	Emir Bekrić	Serbia	50.25	Q
4	2	Ludovic Dubois	France	50.32	Q
5	1	Miloud Rahmani	Algeria	50.83	Q
6	1	Eusebio Haliti	Italy	50.95	q, SB
7	2	Abdelmalik Lahoulou	Algeria	51.56	Q
8	1	Enis Ünsal	Turkey	52.71	q
9	2	Tuncay Örs	Turkey	54.82	

Final – 29 June

Rank	Lane	Name	Nationality	Time	Notes
1st place, gold medalist(s)	4	Emir Bekrić	Serbia	48.83	GR, NR
2nd place, silver medalist(s)	7	Miloud Rahmani	Algeria	49.34	NR
3rd place, bronze medalist(s)	6	Hugo Grillas	France	49.92	SB
4	3	Diego Cabello	Spain	50.17	
5	8	Eusebio Haliti	Italy	50.51	SB
6	5	Ludovic Dubois	France	50.57	
7	2	Abdelmalik Lahoulou	Algeria	51.09	PB
8	1	Enis Ünsal	Turkey	52.27	

=== 3000 metres steeplechase ===
28 June

Rank	Name	Nationality	Time	Notes
1st place, gold medalist(s)	Amor Ben Yahia	Tunisia	8:14.05	NR
2nd place, silver medalist(s)	Tarık Langat Akdağ	Turkey	8:20.08	SB
3rd place, bronze medalist(s)	Hamid Ezzine	Morocco	8:21.03	
4	Abdelmadjed Touil	Algeria	8:22.62	
5	Jaouad Chemlal	Morocco	8:24.77	
6	Patrick Nasti	Italy	8:32.46	
7	Hichem Bouchicha	Algeria	8:33.38	
8	Roberto Aláiz	Spain	8:42.61	
9	Timothee Bommier	France	8:44.30	
10	Hakan Duvar	Turkey	8:58.40	
11	Pep Sansa	Andorra	9:44.69	

=== 4 × 100 metres relay ===
28 June

Rank	Lane	Nation	Competitors	Time	Notes
1st place, gold medalist(s)	3	Italy	Simone Collio, Davide Manenti, Jacques Riparelli, Michael Tumi	39.06	
2nd place, silver medalist(s)	5	Greece	Efthimios Steryioulis, Christos Kalamaras, Emmanouil Paterakis, Panagiotis Andreadis	40.22	SB
3rd place, bronze medalist(s)	4	Turkey	İsmail Aslan, Ferhat Altunkalem, İzzet Safer, Umutcan Emektas	42.82	
	6	France		DNS	

=== 4 × 400 metres relay ===
29 June

Rank	Nation	Competitors	Time	Notes
1st place, gold medalist(s)	Italy	Lorenzo Valentini, Isalbet Juarez, Michele Tricca, Matteo Galvan	3:04.61	SB
2nd place, silver medalist(s)	Turkey	Mehmet Güzel, Buğrahan Kocebeyoğlu, Halit Kiliç, Yavuz Can	3:05.28	SB
3rd place, bronze medalist(s)	Greece	Dimitrios Gravalos, Petros Kyriakidis, Periklis Iakovakis, Konstantinos Nakopoulos	3:07.36	SB
4	Algeria	Abdelmalik Lahoulou, Mohamed Benferrar, Yassine Hathat, Miloud Rahmani	3:08.27	

=== High jump ===
June 27

Rank	Athlete	Nationality	2.00	2.05	2.10	2.15	2.18	2.21	2.24	2.28	2.30	2.32	2.34	2.37	Result	Notes
1st place, gold medalist(s)	Konstadinos Baniotis	Greece	–	–	–	o	–	o	xo	o	o	o	xo	xxx	2.34	GR
2nd place, silver medalist(s)	Silvano Chesani	Italy	–	–	–	o	–	xo	xxo	xo	–	–	xxx		2.28	
3rd place, bronze medalist(s)	Fabrice Saint-Jean	France	–	–	–	o	o	o	o	xxx					2.24	SB
4	Serhat Birinci	Turkey	–	–	–	o	–	o	xxx						2.21	
5	Antonios Mastoras	Greece	–	–	o	o	o	xo	xxx						2.21	
6	Gianmarco Tamberi	Italy	–	–	–	o	–	xxo	xxx						2.21	
7	Rožle Prezelj	Slovenia	–	o	o	o	xo	xxo	xxx						2.21	
8	Majd Eddin Ghazal	Syria	–	o	o	xo	o	xxx							2.18	
9	Simón Siverio	Spain	–	o	o	o	xxx								2.15	
10	Sahabettin Karabulut	Turkey	–	o	o	xxo	xxx								2.15	SB
11	Eugenio Rossi	San Marino	o	xo	xo	xxx									2.10	
	Vasilios Konstantinou	Cyprus													DNS	

=== Pole vault ===
June 28

Rank	Athlete	Nationality	5.10	5.20	5.30	5.40	5.50	5.60	5.70	5.80	Result	Notes
1st place, gold medalist(s)	Giuseppe Gibilisco	Italy	–	–	–	–	o	–	xxo	xxx	5.70	=GR
2nd place, silver medalist(s)	Kévin Ménaldo	France	–	xo	–	xo	–	xxo	xxx		5.60	PB
3rd place, bronze medalist(s)	Giorgio Piantella	Italy	o	o	–	–	xo	xxx			5.50	
4	Dimitrios Patsoukakis	Greece	–	o	x–	o	xx–	x			5.40	
5	Valentin Lavillenie	France	–	–	o	xxx					5.40	
	Nikandros Stylianou	Cyprus	xxx								NM	

=== Long jump ===
June 29

Rank	Athlete	Nationality	#1	#2	#3	#4	#5	#6	Result	Notes
1st place, gold medalist(s)	Louis Tsatoumas	Greece	8.14	x	x	8.04	–	x	8.14	
2nd place, silver medalist(s)	Georgios Tsakonas	Greece	7.97	x	x	7.91	x	x	7.97	
3rd place, bronze medalist(s)	Emanuele Catania	Italy	7.79	x	7.90	x	7.92	x	7.92	
4	Nicolas Gomont	France	x	7.87	x	7.84	7.88	7.89	7.89	
5	Hicham Douiri	Morocco	7.37	x	7.63	7.48	7.63	x	7.63	
6	Alper Kulaksiz	Turkey	7.61	7.61	7.06	x	7.48	7.60	7.61	
7	Mohamed Fathallah Dhifallah	Egypt	7.49	x	x	x	x	x	7.49	

=== Triple jump ===
June 26

Rank	Athlete	Nationality	#1	#2	#3	#4	#5	#6	Result	Notes
1st place, gold medalist(s)	Daniele Greco	Italy	x	16.57	17.13	–	–	–	17.13	=GR
2nd place, silver medalist(s)	Dimitrios Tsiamis	Greece	16.79w	16.53	17.00	16.75	16.80	x	17.00	
3rd place, bronze medalist(s)	Fabrizio Schembri	Italy	x	16.58	16.62	16.58	16.51	16.61	16.62	
4	Karl Taillepierre	France	x	x	16.26	x	x	x	16.26	
5	Aşkın Karaca	Turkey	16.21	x	15.87	x	x	16.12	16.21	
6	José Emilio Bellido	Spain	15.87	x	x	15.63	–	15.53	15.87	
7	Mikail Yalçın	Turkey	15.21	x	x	15.12	15.27	14.77	15.27	

=== Shot put ===
June 29

Rank	Athlete	Nationality	#1	#2	#3	#4	#5	#6	Result	Notes
1st place, gold medalist(s)	Borja Vivas	Spain	19.44	19.51	19.60	x	19.99	x	19.99	
2nd place, silver medalist(s)	Marin Premeru	Croatia	19.15	19.51	19.69	19.72	19.44	x	19.72	
3rd place, bronze medalist(s)	Hamza Alić	Bosnia and Herzegovina	19.60	x	x	18.95	x	19.69	19.69	
4	Kemal Mešić	Bosnia and Herzegovina	x	x	19.33	19.33	x	19.60	19.60	
5	Hüseyin Atıcı	Turkey	18.80	19.25	19.53	x	19.07	19.41	19.53	
6	Yasser Ibrahim Farag	Egypt	18.81	18.89	18.50	19.25	18.87	x	19.25	
7	Tumatai Dauphin	France	18.02	18.78	x	18.92	18.70	18.53	18.92	
8	Murat Gündüz	Turkey	17.49	17.42	17.66	17.43	x	17.19	17.66	
	Gaëtan Bucki	France							DNS	
	Danijel Furtula	Montenegro							DNS	
	Michalis Stamatogiannis	Greece							DNS	

=== Discus throw ===
June 27

Rank	Athlete	Nationality	#1	#2	#3	#4	#5	#6	Result	Notes
1st place, gold medalist(s)	Martin Marić	Croatia	59.88	60.78	61.46	60.18	61.12	60.21	61.46	
2nd place, silver medalist(s)	Ercüment Olgundeniz	Turkey	61.46	x	x	60.78	61.02	x	61.46	
3rd place, bronze medalist(s)	Danijel Furtula	Montenegro	59.70	x	61.44	x	x	59.47	61.44	
4	Irfan Yildirim	Turkey	60.28	61.15	x	x	61.21	60.42	61.21	
5	Giovanni Faloci	Italy	56.32	x	59.23	x	x	60.21	60.21	
6	Yasser Ibrahim Farag	Egypt	52.28	55.24	58.26	57.50	59.72	58.40	59.72	
7	Apostolos Parellis	Cyprus	56.07	59.40	57.41	58.40	57.45	58.91	59.40	
8	Yeoryios Tremos	Greece	54.41	54.29	x	54.41	55.93	55.47	55.93	
9	Jean-François Aurokiom	France	x	52.46	53.69				53.69	
10	Ali Khelifa Maaloul	Libya	50.87	x	53.67				53.67	

=== Hammer throw ===
June 28

Rank	Athlete	Nationality	#1	#2	#3	#4	#5	#6	Result	Notes
1st place, gold medalist(s)	Mostafa Al-Gamel	Egypt	73.82	74.32	76.68	76.02	x	x	76.68	
2nd place, silver medalist(s)	Hassan Mohamed Mahmoud	Egypt	73.16	72.41	73.48	73.93	74.96	74.28	74.96	
3rd place, bronze medalist(s)	Nicola Vizzoni	Italy	74.18	72.96	73.70	74.86	74.10	x	74.86	
4	Quentin Bigot	France	69.98	72.93	73.30	72.75	72.00	73.83	73.83	
5	Jérôme Bortoluzzi	France	69.09	72.98	71.56	x	71.32	x	72.98	
6	Lorenzo Povegliano	Italy	71.41	x	x	x	x	x	71.41	
7	Konstantinos Stathelakos	Cyprus	x	x	65.16	66.29	65.40	67.26	67.26	

=== Javelin throw ===
June 26

Rank	Athlete	Nationality	#1	#2	#3	#4	#5	#6	Result	Notes
1st place, gold medalist(s)	Fatih Avan	Turkey	82.39	83.84	–	–	–	x	83.84	
2nd place, silver medalist(s)	Ihab Abdelrahman El Sayed	Egypt	82.45	x	x	73.32	76.76	78.42	82.45	NR
3rd place, bronze medalist(s)	Spyridon Lebesis	Greece	71.51	76.64	73.76	74.07	78.53	74.67	78.53	
4	Dejan Mileusnić	Bosnia and Herzegovina	75.58	76.74	77.27	76.23	73.49	71.73	77.27	
5	Matija Kranjc	Slovenia	67.32	76.23	71.79	72.65	72.74	69.95	76.23	
6	Norbert Bonvecchio	Italy	x	62.88	x	67.29	x	72.55	72.55	
7	Mustafa Tan	Turkey	70.29	x	70.49	x	68.84	70.13	70.49	
	Jérôme Haeffler	France							DNS	

== Women's results ==
=== 100 metres ===
Heats – 27 June
Wind:
Heat 1: +0.2 m/s, Heat 2: +0.4 m/s

Rank	Heat	Name	Nationality	Time	Notes
1	1	Eleni Artymata	Cyprus	11.68	Q
1	2	Ilenia Draisci	Italy	11.68	Q
3	1	Estela García	Spain	11.69	Q
4	1	Audrey Alloh	Italy	11.69	Q, SB
5	2	Maria Gatou	Greece	11.73	Q, SB
6	2	Carima Louami	France	11.74	Q
7	2	Anna Ramona Papaioannou	Cyprus	11.76	q
8	2	Sara Strajnar	Slovenia	11.87	q
9	1	Kristina Žumer	Slovenia	11.89	
10	2	Hatice Öztürk	Turkey	12.20	
	1	Nimet Karakuş	Turkey	DNF	
	2	Souheir Bouali	Algeria	DNS	

Final – 27 June
Wind:
-0.7 m/s

Rank	Lane	Name	Nationality	Time	Notes
1st place, gold medalist(s)	5	Ilenia Draisci	Italy	11.53	
2nd place, silver medalist(s)	6	Estela García	Spain	11.53	
3rd place, bronze medalist(s)	4	Eleni Artymata	Cyprus	11.55	
4	7	Carima Louami	France	11.61	SB
5	2	Audrey Alloh	Italy	11.67	SB
6	1	Sara Strajnar	Slovenia	11.74	
7	8	Anna Ramona Papaioannou	Cyprus	11.89	
	3	Maria Gatou	Greece	DQ	FS

=== 200 metres ===
Heats – 26 June
Wind:
Heat 1: -1.4 m/s, Heat 2: -1.3 m/s

Rank	Heat	Name	Nationality	Time	Notes
1	1	Libania Grenot	Italy	23.59	Q
1	2	Eleni Artymata	Cyprus	23.59	Q
3	1	Nimet Karakuş	Turkey	23.71	Q
4	1	Anna Ramona Papaioannou	Cyprus	23.77	Q, PB
5	2	Grigoria-Emmanouela Keramida	Greece	23.95	Q
6	1	Kristina Žumer	Slovenia	23.96	q
7	1	Estela García	Spain	24.05	q
8	2	Sabina Veit	Slovenia	24.09	Q
9	2	Carima Louami	France	24.14	
	2	Souheir Bouali	Algeria	DNS	

Final – 26 June
Wind:
-1.8 m/s

Rank	Lane	Name	Nationality	Time	Notes
1st place, gold medalist(s)	4	Eleni Artymata	Cyprus	23.18	
2nd place, silver medalist(s)	4	Libania Grenot	Italy	23.20	SB
3rd place, bronze medalist(s)	5	Nimet Karakuş	Turkey	23.40	PB
4	1	Estela García	Spain	23.65	PB
5	2	Anna Ramona Papaioannou	Cyprus	23.66	PB
6	8	Sabina Veit	Slovenia	23.75	SB
7	7	Kristina Žumer	Slovenia	23.75	SB
8	3	Grigoria-Emmanouela Keramida	Greece	23.99	

=== 400 metres ===
28 June

Rank	Lane	Name	Nationality	Time	Notes
1st place, gold medalist(s)	3	Chiara Bazzoni	Italy	52.06	PB
2nd place, silver medalist(s)	4	Maria Benedicta Chigbolu	Italy	52.66	PB
3rd place, bronze medalist(s)	5	Agnès Raharolahy	France	52.90	PB
4	8	Birsen Engin	Turkey	53.37	SB
5	6	Agni Derveni	Greece	54.05	
6	2	Derya Yildirim	Turkey	55.25	
	7	Gretta Taslakian	Lebanon	DQ	

=== 800 metres ===
29 June

Rank	Name	Nationality	Time	Notes
1st place, gold medalist(s)	Malika Akkaoui	Morocco	2:00.72	SB
2nd place, silver medalist(s)	Siham Hilali	Morocco	2:00.79	
3rd place, bronze medalist(s)	Tuğba Koyuncu	Turkey	2:01.74	
4	Luiza Gega	Albania	2:01.96	NR
5	Marta Milani	Italy	2:04.01	
6	Elif Karabulut	Turkey	2:08.58	

=== 1500 metres ===
26 June

Rank	Name	Nationality	Time	Notes
1st place, gold medalist(s)	Siham Hilali	Morocco	4:04.06	GR
2nd place, silver medalist(s)	Luiza Gega	Albania	4:05.63	
3rd place, bronze medalist(s)	Tuğba Koyuncu	Turkey	4:06.22	SB
4	Margherita Magnani	Italy	4:06.34	PB
5	Esma Aydemir	Turkey	4:09.06	SB
6	Giulia Viola	Italy	4:10.00	PB
7	Elena García	Spain	4:15.00	
8	Lauranne Picoche	France	4:16.68	
	Rababe Arrafi	Morocco	DNF	

=== 5000 metres ===
28 June

Rank	Name	Nationality	Time	Notes
1st place, gold medalist(s)	Christine Bardelle	France	15:39.54	
2nd place, silver medalist(s)	Silvia Weissteiner	Italy	15:44.53	
3rd place, bronze medalist(s)	Elena Romagnolo	Italy	16:11.17	
4	Ourania Rebouli	Greece	16:21.45	
	Esma Aydemir	Turkey	DNF	
	Nadia Noujani	Morocco	DNF	

=== 10,000 metres ===
June 26

Rank	Name	Nationality	Time	Note
1st place, gold medalist(s)	Kenza Dahmani	Algeria	31:44.75	PB
2nd place, silver medalist(s)	Elvan Abeylegesse	Turkey	31:49.03	
3rd place, bronze medalist(s)	Souad Aït Salem	Algeria	31:51.32	
4	Ourania Rebouli	Greece	32:05.54	SB
5	Bahar Dogan	Turkey	32:16.55	
	Sladjana Perunovic	Montenegro	DNF	

=== Half marathon ===
June 29

Rank	Name	Nationality	Time	Note
1st place, gold medalist(s)	Valeria Straneo	Italy	1:11:00	
2nd place, silver medalist(s)	Souad Aït Salem	Algeria	1:13:54	
3rd place, bronze medalist(s)	Ümmü Kiraz	Turkey	1:16:51	
4	Sultan Haydar	Turkey	1:18:01	
5	Magdalini Gazea	Greece	1:21:24	
	Fatima Ayachi	Morocco	DNF	
	Kenza Dahmani	Algeria	DNF	
	Hanane Janat	Morocco	DNF	
	Elvan Abeylegesse	Turkey	DNS	
	Slađana Perunović	Montenegro	DNS	

=== 100 metres hurdles ===
June 28
Wind: -0.3 m/s

Rank	Lane	Name	Nationality	Time	Note
1st place, gold medalist(s)	6	Marzia Caravelli	Italy	12.98	
2nd place, silver medalist(s)	5	Veronica Borsi	Italy	13.05	
3rd place, bronze medalist(s)	4	Marina Tomić	Slovenia	13.11	SB
4	3	Aisseta Diawara	France	13.34	SB
5	7	Olympia Petsoudi	Greece	13.51	
6	1	Yamina Hajjaji	Morocco	13.85	
	2	Ivana Lončarek	Croatia	DNS	
	8	Kübra Sesli	Turkey	DNS	

=== 400 metres hurdles ===
June 27

Rank	Lane	Name	Nationality	Time	Note
1st place, gold medalist(s)	4	Hayat Lambarki	Morocco	55.27	PB
2nd place, silver medalist(s)	3	Lamia Lhabz	Morocco	55.51	PB
3rd place, bronze medalist(s)	6	Manuela Gentili	Italy	55.89	SB
4	7	Francesca Doveri	Italy	56.65	PB
5	5	Birsen Engin	Turkey	57.72	
6	2	Özge Akın	Turkey	58.13	
7	1	Mila Andrić	Serbia	1:01.33	

=== 3000 metres steeplechase ===
June 28

Rank	Name	Nationality	Time	Note
1st place, gold medalist(s)	Amina Bettiche	Algeria	9:40.71	GR
2nd place, silver medalist(s)	Salima Elouali Alami	Morocco	9:43.71	
3rd place, bronze medalist(s)	Gülcan Mıngır	Turkey	9:46.08	
4	Kaltoum Bouaasayriya	Morocco	9:49.16	
5	Türkan Özata	Turkey	9:52.04	
6	Tauria Samiri	Italy	10:01.23	PB
7	Claire Navez-Perraux	France	10:06.36	
8	Biljana Cvijanović	Bosnia and Herzegovina	10:16.80	NR
	Giulia Martinelli	Italy	DNF	
	Teresa Urbina	Spain	DNF	

=== 4 × 100 metres relay ===
28 June

Rank	Lane	Nation	Competitors	Time	Notes
1st place, gold medalist(s)	4	Italy	Audrey Alloh, Ilenia Draisci, Jessica Paoletta, Micol Cattaneo	44.66	
2nd place, silver medalist(s)	6	Cyprus	Paraskevi Andreou, Anna Ramona Papaioannou, Dimitra Kyriakidou, Eleni Artymata	44.79	NR
3rd place, bronze medalist(s)	3	Greece	Maria Gatou, Agni Derveni, Olympia Petsoudi, Grigoria-Emmanouela Keramida	45.12	SB
4	7	Slovenia	Marina Tomić, Sara Strajnar, Sabina Velt, Nina Kolarič	45.71	
5	5	Turkey	Aksel Demirtaş-Gürcan, Saliha Özyurt, Hatice Öztürk, Sema Apak	46.24	

=== 4 × 400 metres relay ===
29 June

Rank	Nation	Competitors	Time	Notes
1st place, gold medalist(s)	Italy	Maria Enrica Spacca, Elena Maria Bonfanti, Maria Benedicta Chigbolu, Chiara Bazzoni	3:32.44	SB
2nd place, silver medalist(s)	Turkey	Saliha Özyurt, Birsen Engin, Sema Apak, Derya Yildirim	3:43.61	
	Morocco	Lamia Lhabz, Rababe Arrafi, Hayat Lambarki, Malika Akkaoui	DQ	

=== 20 kilometres walk ===
June 27

Rank	Name	Nationality	Time	Note
1st place, gold medalist(s)	Eleonora Anna Giorgi	Italy	1:39:13	
2nd place, silver medalist(s)	Raquel González	Spain	1:41:08	
3rd place, bronze medalist(s)	Antigoni Drisbioti	Greece	1:41:53	
4	Corinne Baudouin	France	1:45:28	
5	Olfa Lafi	Tunisia	1:52:45	
6	Anne-Gaëlle Retout	France	1:53:16	
	Gamze Özgör	Turkey	DNF	
	Narin Sağlam	Turkey	DNS	

=== High jump ===
June 29

Rank	Athlete	Nationality	1.70	1.75	1.78	1.81	1.84	1.87	1.90	1.92	1.94	1.94	1.92	1.90	Result	Notes
1st place, gold medalist(s)	Burcu Ayhan	Turkey	–	-	o	o	o	o	o	o	xxx	x	x	x	1.92	SB
1st place, gold medalist(s)	Ana Šimić	Croatia	–	-	-	o	o	o	o	o	xxx	x	x	x	1.92	
3rd place, bronze medalist(s)	Antonia Stergiou	Greece	–	o	-	o	o	o	o	xxx					1.90	SB
4	Leontia Kallenou	Cyprus	–	o	o	o	o	o	xxx						1.87	PB
5	Sibel Çinar	Turkey	o	o	xxo	xxx									1.78	

=== Pole vault ===
June 26

Rank	Athlete	Nationality	3.65	3.80	3.95	4.10	4.20	4.30	4.40	4.50	4.61	Result	Notes
1st place, gold medalist(s)	Stella-Iro Ledaki	Greece	–	-	–	o	o	o	o	o	xxx	4.50	=GR
2nd place, silver medalist(s)	Naroa Agirre	Spain	–	-	o	o	o	o	xo	xxx		4.40	SB
3rd place, bronze medalist(s)	Marion Buisson	France	–	-	o	xo	o	o	xo	xxx		4.40	SB
4	Lorela Manou	Greece	–	–	-	o	o	o	xxx			4.30	
5	Giorgia Benecchi	Italy	–	-	o	o	xo	xo	xxx			4.30	
5	Tina Šutej	Slovenia	–	-	o	o	xo	xo	xxx			4.30	
7	Elmas Seda Firtina	Turkey	–	–	o	xxx						3.95	
8	Buse Arikazan	Turkey	–	o	xxo	xxx						3.95	

=== Long jump ===
June 27

Rank	Athlete	Nationality	#1	#2	#3	#4	#5	#6	Result	Notes
1st place, gold medalist(s)	Nektaria Panagi	Cyprus	6.44	x	6.33	6.22	6.51	6.48	6.51	
2nd place, silver medalist(s)	Nina Kolarič	Slovenia	x	6.42	6.13	x	6.31	6.49	6.49	
3rd place, bronze medalist(s)	Tania Vicenzino	Italy	6.01	6.32	x	6.27	6.05	6.38	6.38	
4	Evaggelia Galeni	Greece	x	6.04	x	5.90	6.32	x	6.32	
5	Juliet Itoya	Spain	x	x	6.23	4.73	x	x	6.23	
6	Jamaa Chnaik	Morocco	x	5.98	6.01	6.13	x	x	6.13	
7	Yamina Hajjaji	Morocco	6.03	x	5.98	5.76	6.01	5.95	6.03	
8	Eleftheria Christofi	Cyprus	x	6.02	5.90	x	x	5.98	6.02	
9	Serpil Koçak	Turkey	x	5.92	5.92				5.92	
10	Sevim Sinmez Serbest	Turkey	x	x	5.61				5.61	
	Rebecca Camilleri	Malta							DNS	

=== Triple jump ===
June 28

Rank	Athlete	Nationality	#1	#2	#3	#4	#5	#6	Result	Notes
1st place, gold medalist(s)	Athanasia Perra	Greece	14.10	x	14.48	x	–	x	14.48	
2nd place, silver medalist(s)	Snežana Rodić	Slovenia	14.16	14.22	x	14.36	14.16	x	14.36	
3rd place, bronze medalist(s)	Baya Rahouli	Algeria	x	13.75	14.04	x	13.66	14.00	14.04	
4	Simona La Mantia	Italy	13.87	13.88	13.97	13.76	x	13.70	13.97	
5	Sevim Sinmez Serbest	Turkey	13.61	x	13.56	13.27	13.75	13.67	13.75	
6	Niki Panetta	Greece	13.69	13.64	x	x	13.42	x	13.69	
7	Teresa Nzola Meso Ba	France	x	13.09	13.36	x	13.16	x	13.36	
8	Jihad Bakhchi	Morocco	x	13.02	x	12.61	12.84	12.86	13.02	
9	Eleftheria Christofi	Cyprus	12.50	12.10	12.91				12.91	
10	Jamaa Chnaik	Morocco	12.90	x	x				12.90	

=== Discus throw ===
June 29

Rank	Athlete	Nationality	#1	#2	#3	#4	#5	#6	Result	Notes
1st place, gold medalist(s)	Sandra Perković	Croatia	63.78	x	62.93	66.21	65.30	x	66.21	
2nd place, silver medalist(s)	Dragana Tomašević	Serbia	58.73	60.40	59.83	60.94	61.88	x	61.88	
3rd place, bronze medalist(s)	Chrysoula Anagnostopoulou	Greece	52.10	52.03	51.24	54.60	51.93	55.01	55.01	
4	Pauline Pousse	France	53.37	x	51.95	52.85	x	x	53.37	
5	Sabina Asenjo	Spain	51.40	52.35	52.78	x	53.10	53.25	53.25	
6	Androniki Lada	Cyprus	48.48	x	x	52.02	x	51.84	52.02	
7	Laura Bordignon	Italy	x	50.24	49.50	49.90	50.43	51.35	51.35	

=== Hammer throw ===
June 26

Rank	Athlete	Nationality	#1	#2	#3	#4	#5	#6	Result	Notes
1st place, gold medalist(s)	Jessika Guehaseim	France	66.69	67.14	64.91	66.31	x	66.17	67.14	
2nd place, silver medalist(s)	Berta Castells	Spain	x	65.95	64.67	61.92	65.52	66.16	66.16	
3rd place, bronze medalist(s)	Silvia Salis	Italy	62.52	x	x	x	x	x	62.52	
4	Ayşegül Alniaçik	Turkey	x	x	60.18	61.25	62.23	x	62.23	

=== Javelin throw ===
June 28

Rank	Athlete	Nationality	#1	#2	#3	#4	#5	#6	Result	Notes
1st place, gold medalist(s)	Martina Ratej	Slovenia	59.15	x	x	x	x	60.28	60.28	
2nd place, silver medalist(s)	Tatjana Jelača	Serbia	56.40	55.70	57.88	57.70	53.00	57.81	57.88	
3rd place, bronze medalist(s)	Noraida Bicet	Spain	52.54	52.26	55.80	55.59	57.44	57.65	57.65	
4	Mathilde Andraud	France	52.20	x	x	x	x	x	52.20	
5	Berivan Şakır	Turkey	45.54	49.35	49.70	x	x	49.70	49.70	
6	Eva Vivod	Slovenia	46.72	48.56	49.44	46.66	48.83	x	49.44	
7	Eda Tuğsuz	Turkey	x	44.60	x	44.37	47.82	48.87	48.87	

=== Heptathlon ===
June 28–29

The highest mark recorded in each event is highlighted in yellow

Rank	Athlete	Nationality	100m H	HJ	SP	200m	LJ	JT	800m	Points	Notes
1st place, gold medalist(s)	Yasmina Omrani	Algeria	13.89	1.72	13.66	25.25	5.90	39.58	2:20.55	5802	
2nd place, silver medalist(s)	Sofia Yfantidou	Greece	14.20	1.66	13.16	26.52	5.65	54.37	2:20.50	5752	
3rd place, bronze medalist(s)	Serpil Koçak	Turkey	14.44	1.60	11.98	25.55	5.87	35.17	2:35.75	5158	
4	Pinar Aday	Turkey	14.53	1.75	9.07	27.49	5.75	29.04	2:23.46	4971	
