= Algeria at the 2007 World Championships in Athletics =

- Flag of Algeria
- WA code: ALG

in Osaka, Japan 25 August 2007 – 2 September 2007
- Competitors: 10 (8 men and 2 women)
- Medals: Gold 0 Silver 0 Bronze 0 Total 0

World Championships in Athletics appearances (overview)
- 1983; 1987; 1991; 1993; 1995; 1997; 1999; 2001; 2003; 2005; 2007; 2009; 2011; 2013; 2015; 2017; 2019; 2022; 2023; 2025

Algeria competed at the 2007 World Championships in Athletics in Osaka, Japan, from 25 August to 2 September 2007.

== Results ==
Algeria entered 10 athletes.

Key

- Q = Qualified for the next round
- q = Qualified for the next round as a fastest loser or, in field events, by position without achieving the qualifying target
- NR = National record
- PB = Personal best
- SB = Season best
- N/A = Round not applicable for the event

=== Men ===
Track and road events

Athlete	Event	Heat		Semifinal		Final		Final Rank
Athlete	Event	Result	Rank	Result	Rank	Result	Rank	Final Rank
Nabil Madi	800 metres	1:46.02 Q	2	1:45.59	4	Did not advance		12
Tarek Boukensa	1500 metres	3:41.71 Q	4	3:42.88 Q	2	3:35.26	5	5
Kamal Boulahfane	1500 metres	3:43.88	12	Did not advance				32
Antar Zerguelaïne	1500 metres	3:40.97 Q	5	3:40.79 Q	2	3:35.29	6	6
Khoudir Aggoune	5000 metres	13:47.36	6	—		Did not advance		17
Rabia Makhloufi	3000 metres s'chase	8:33.88	7	—		Did not advance		23

Field events

Athlete	Event	Qualification		Final		Final Rank
Athlete	Event	Result	Rank	Result	Rank	Final Rank
Abderrahmane Hammad	High jump	2.14	19	Did not advance		36
Issam Nima	Long jump	7.88	7	Did not advance		17

=== Women ===
Track and road events

Athlete	Event	Heat		Semifinal		Final		Final Rank
Athlete	Event	Result	Rank	Result	Rank	Result	Rank	Final Rank
Nahida Touhami	1500 metres	4:14.38	8	Did not advance				28
Souad Aït Salem	Marathon	—				2:35:29	16	16
