= Aziz Lahbabi =

Moroccan long-distance runner

Medal record

Men's Athletics

Representing Morocco

Mediterranean Games
Silver medal – second place	Mersin 2013	10,000 m
Bronze medal – third place	Mersin 2013	5000 m

Aziz Lahbabi (born 3 February 1991, in Khenifra) is a Moroccan long-distance runner. At the 2012 Summer Olympics, he competed in the Men's 5000 metres, finishing 31st overall in Round 1, failing to qualify for the final.

He won his first international medal at the 2010 World Junior Championships in Athletics, taking third place in the 5000 metres. He placed 13th at the senior race for the 2011 African Cross Country Championships, which was enough for a team bronze medal. He set a 5000 m best of 13:13.68 minutes that June, but was caught doping shortly afterwards, receiving a six-month ban for methylhexanamine.

Lahbabi was a double medallist at the 2013 Mediterranean Games, taking 5000 m bronze and a 10,000 metres silver medal. He won his national championship in the 5000 m and was selected for the 2013 World Championships in Athletics, where he ran in the heats only. He won the Roma-Ostia Half Marathon in 2014 with a significant personal best of 59:25 minutes – a Moroccan record and the fastest by a non-East African runner.
