= Algeria at the 2025 World Athletics Championships =

- Flag of Algeria
- WA code: ALG

in Tokyo, Japan 13 September 2025 – 21 September 2025
- Competitors: 9 (8 men and 1 woman) in 6 events
- Medals Ranked 27th: Gold 0 Silver 1 Bronze 0 Total 1

World Athletics Championships appearances (overview)
- 1983; 1987; 1991; 1993; 1995; 1997; 1999; 2001; 2003; 2005; 2007; 2009; 2011; 2013; 2015; 2017; 2019; 2022; 2023; 2025

Algeria competed at the 2025 World Athletics Championships in Tokyo, Japan, from 13 to 21 September 2025.

== Medallists ==
Medal	Athlete	Event	Date
Silver	Djamel Sedjati	Men's 800 metres	September 20

== Results ==
Algeria entered 10 athletes to the championships: 8 men and 1 woman.

Key

- Q = Qualified for the next round
- q = Qualified for the next round as a fastest loser or, in field events, by position without achieving the qualifying target
- NR = National record
- PB = Personal best
- SB = Season best
- N/A = Round not applicable for the event

=== Men ===
Track and road events

Athlete	Event	Heat		Semifinal		Final	
Athlete	Event	Result	Rank	Result	Rank	Result	Rank
Mohamed Ali Gouaned	800 metres	1:45.49	5	Did not advance			
Slimane Moula	800 metres	1:44.77	2 Q	1:46.82	8	Did not advance	
Djamel Sedjati	800 metres	1:45.01	2 Q	1:45.09	2 Q	1:41.90 SB	2nd place, silver medalist(s)
Heithem Chenitef	1500 metres	3:45.13	13	Did not advance			
Mohammed Benyettou	Marathon	—N/a				2:20:51 SB	47
Abderrazak Charik	Marathon	—N/a				2:13:06 SB	18
Amine Bouanani	110 metres hurdles	13.75	7	Did not advance			

Field events

Athlete	Event	Qualification		Final	
Athlete	Event	Distance	Position	Distance	Position
Yasser Triki	Triple jump	17.26	1 Q	17.25	4

=== Women ===
Field events

Athlete	Event	Qualification		Final	
Athlete	Event	Distance	Position	Distance	Position
Zahra Tatar	Hammer throw	65.86	33	Did not advance	
