= Athletics at the 2011 All-Africa Games – Men's 400 metres hurdles =

The Men's 400 meters hurdles at the 2011 All-Africa Games took place on 12 and 13 September at the Estádio Nacional do Zimpeto.

== Medalists ==
Gold	Abderahmane Hamadi (ALG)
Silver	Kurt Couto (MOZ)
Bronze	Julius Rotich (KEN)

== Records ==
Prior to the competition, the following records were as follows.

World record	Kevin Young (USA)	46.78	Barcelona, Spain	6 August 1992
World leading	Louis van Zyl (RSA)	47.66	Pretoria, South Africa	25 February 2011
World leading	Louis van Zyl (RSA)	47.66	Ostrava, Czech Republic	31 May 2011
African record	Samuel Matete (ZAM)	47.10	Zürich, Switzerland	7 August 1991

== Schedule ==
Date	Time	Round
September 13, 2011	17:25	Semi-Final
September 14, 2011	17:20	Final

KEY:	q	Fastest non-qualifiers	Q	Qualified	NR	National record	PB	Personal best	SB	Seasonal best

=== Semifinals ===
Qualification: First 3 in each heat (Q) and the next 2 fastest (q) advance to the Final.

Rank	Heat	Name	Nationality	Time	Notes
1	2	Julius Rotich	Kenya	50.87	Q
2	1	Daniel Lagamang	Botswana	50.88	Q, NR
3	1	Hardus Maritz	Namibia	51.40	Q
4	2	Kurt Couto	Mozambique	51.40	Q
5	2	Miloud Rahmani	Algeria	51.58	Q
6	1	Abderahmane Hamadi	Algeria	51.89	Q
7	2	Hafiz Mohamed	Sudan	52.02	q
8	1	Abdelgadir Idriss	Sudan	52.76	q
9	1	Titos Januario Dlalice	Mozambique	56.06	
	2	Chérif Issa Abdoulaye	Benin	DQ	

=== Final ===
Rank	Name	Nationality	Time	Notes
1st place, gold medalist(s)	Abderahmane Hamadi	Algeria	50.48	
2nd place, silver medalist(s)	Kurt Couto	Mozambique	51.04	
3rd place, bronze medalist(s)	Julius Rotich	Kenya	51.15	
4	Daniel Lagamang	Botswana	51.44	
5	Hafiz Mohamed	Sudan	51.44	
6	Miloud Rahmani	Algeria	52.00	
7	Hardus Maritz	Namibia	52.29	
8	Abdelgadir Idriss	Sudan	53.45	
