= Anas Beshr =

Egyptian sprinter

Personal information
- Born: 19 July 1993 (age 32)

Sport
- Country: Egypt
- Sport: Track and field
- Event: 400m

Anas Beshr (born 19 July 1993) is an Egyptian sprinter specializing in the 400 meters.

== 2013 season ==
Beshr won silver at the 2013 Mediterranean Games in the 400 meters.

== 2014 season ==
He set a national record in 2014 (later broken).

== 2015 season ==
In 2015 he won silver at the 2015 Arab Athletics Championships.

== 2016 season ==
In 2016, at a meet in Montverde, Florida, Beshr reached the Olympic qualifying standard in the 400 meters setting a new national record. He competed at the 2016 Summer Olympics.
