= Maria Gatou =

Greek sprinter (born 1989)

Personal information
- Nationality: Greek
- Born: 16 August 1989 (age 36) Thessaloniki, Greece

Sport
- Sport: Athletics
- Event(s): 60m, 100m, 200m

Achievements and titles
- Personal best(s): 7.29 sec, 11.44 sec

Maria Gatou (born 16 August 1989) is a Greek sprinter who competes in 100m and 200m in open track and 60m in indoor track. She competed in the 60 metres event at the 2014 IAAF World Indoor Championships.

Her personal best in 60m is 7.29 from 2014.

== Honours ==
Year	Competition	Venue	Position	Event	Notes
Representing Greece
2009	Mediterranean Games	Pescara, Italy	3rd	4 × 100 m	45.45
2011	European U23 Championships	Ostrava, Czech Republic	22nd (h)	100m	12.06 (wind: -0.3 m/s)
2013	Mediterranean Games	Mersin, Turkey	3rd	4 × 100 m	45.12
2016	European Championships	Amsterdam, Netherlands	14th (h)	4 × 100 m	44.58
2021	European Indoor Championships	Toruń, Poland	28th (h)	60 m	7.40
