= Abdelmadjed Touil =

Algerian middle-distance runner

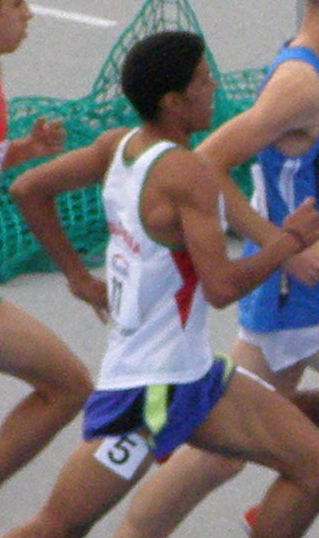
- Abdelmadjed Touil in 2008

Personal information
- Nationality: Algerian
- Born: 11 February 1989 (age 37)

Sport
- Sport: Track and field
- Event(s): 1500 m and 3000 m steeplechase

Achievements and titles
- Personal best(s): 1500 m: 3:39.87 (2009); 3000 m steeplechase: 8:15.93 (2013)
Medal record
Men's athletics
Representing (Algeria)
Universiade
Silver medal – second place	2011 Shenzhen	1500 m
Arab Championships
Gold medal – first place	2013 Doha	3000 m steeplechase

Abdelmadjed Touil (born 11 February 1989 in El Oued) is an Algerian distance runner who specialises in the 1500 metres and 3000 metres steeplechase. He won the silver medal at the 2011 Summer Universiade. In addition, he represented his country at the 2013 World Championships, narrowly missing the final.

He has a twin brother, Imad, who is also a runner.

== Competition record ==
Year	Competition	Venue	Position	Event	Notes
Representing Algeria
2008	World Junior Championships	Bydgoszcz, Poland	11th	1500 m	3:51.82
2011	Universiade	Shenzhen, China	15th (sf)	800 m	1:48.92
2011	Universiade	Shenzhen, China	2nd	1500 m	3:48.24
2013	Arab Championships	Doha, Qatar	1st	3000 m s'chase	8:57.09
2013	Mediterranean Games	Mersin, Turkey	4th	3000 m s'chase	8:22.62
2013	World Championships	Moscow, Russia	17th (h)	3000 m s'chase	8:25.89

== Personal bests ==
Outdoor

- 1500 metres – 3:39.87 (Villeneuve-d'Ascq 2009)
- 3000 metres steeplechase – 8:15.93 (Rabat 2013)
