= Manolis Paterakis =

WWII Cretan resistance fighter

Manolis or Emmanouil Paterakis (Greek: Εμμανουήλ (Μανώλης) Πατεράκης) was a member of the Cretan resistance during World War II, who lived in the village of Koustogerako in the then-province of Selino. In English language sources, he also appears as Manoli Paterakis.

== Life ==
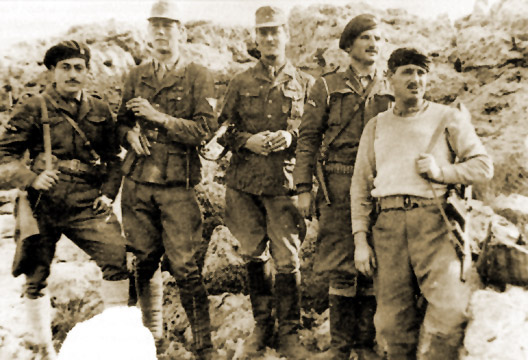
Kreipe's abduction team; Paterakis is second from right.

At the outbreak of World War II, Paterakis was a young gendarme on the island of Crete. After the Battle of Crete he evacuated to the Middle East, where he trained with the British Commandos in sabotage. He was returned to Crete, along with Georgios Tyrakis, as the permanent partners of Patrick Leigh Fermor and W. Stanley Moss on a mission to capture German general Heinrich Kreipe. They arrested the general and drove him to the mountains, continuing south to a bay codenamed "X75" near Rodakino, from which Kreipe was embarked on a British motor launch destined for Cairo.

As the war continued, the Germans murdered Paterakis's father and his two brothers. After the war, he found himself without work. Considerably later on, the Germans, ignorant of the part which he had played in taking Kreipe prisoner, employed him as a guard at the Maleme German military cemetery.
