= Imad Touil =

Algerian middle-distance runner

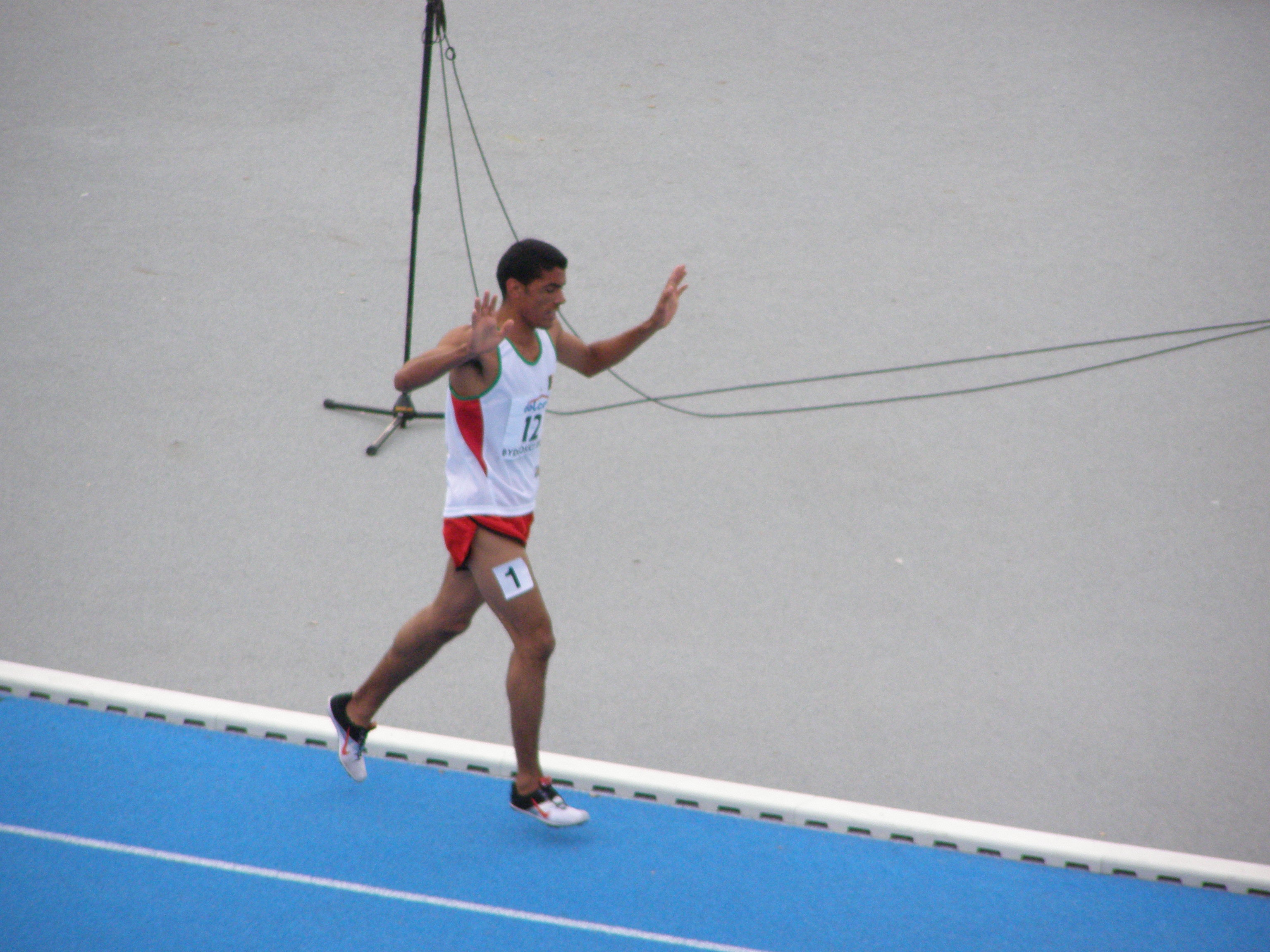
- Touil in Bydgoszcz, 2008.

Personal information
- Nationality: Algeria
- Born: 11 February 1989 (age 37) El Oued

Sport
- Sport: Running
- Event: 1500 metres

Achievements and titles
- Personal best(s): 1000 m: 2:18.52 m (Tomblaine 2009); 1500 m: 3:35.82 m (Heusden-Zolder 2009)
Medal record
Representing Algeria
Men's athletics
World Junior Championships
Gold medal – first place	2008 Bydgoszcz	1500 m
Universiade
Gold medal – first place	2011 Shenzhen	1500 m
Mediterranean Games
Bronze medal – third place	2013 Mersin	1500 m

Imad Touil (born 11 February 1989) is an Algerian middle-distance runner who specialises in the 1500 metres.

At the 2008 World Junior Championships in Athletics in Bydgoszcz, Poland, Touil won a gold medal over 1500 metres. Touil was also part of the Algerian team at the 2009 World Championships.

He has a twin brother, Abdelmadjed, who is also a runner.

== Personal best ==
Distance	Time	venue
1000 m	2:18.52 m	Tomblaine, France (26 June 2009)
1500 m	3:35.82 m	Rabat, Morocco (27 May 2012)
