= Mohamed Kamel Selmi =

Algerian long-distance runner

Personal information
- Born: 14 September 1963 (age 62)

Sport
- Sport: Marathon running

Mohamed Kamel Salmi (born 14 September 1963) is a retired Algerian long-distance runner specializing in the marathon.

He finished 59th in the 1992 Olympic marathon. He also competed at the 1991 World Championships and the 1993 World Championships but failed to finish the race on both occasions. He also won the silver medal in the 10,000 metres at the 1990 Maghreb Championships, behind Khalid Boulami.

His best time was 2.12.47 hours, achieved in the 1993 Eindhoven Marathon, a competition he won.

== Achievements ==
- All results regarding marathon, unless stated otherwise

Year	Competition	Venue	Position	Notes
Representing Algeria
1991	World Championships	Tokyo, Japan	—	DNF
1992	Olympic Games	Barcelona, Spain	59th	2:26:56
1993	World Championships	Stuttgart, Germany	—	DNF
1993	Eindhoven Marathon	Eindhoven, Netherlands	1st	2:12:47
