= Miloud Rahmani =

Algerian hurdler (born 1982)

Personal information
- Nationality: Algeria
- Born: 30 December 1982 (age 43)
- Height: 1.78 m (5 ft 10 in)
- Weight: 62 kg (137 lb)

Sport
- Sport: Athletics
- Event: 400 m hurdles
Medal record
Men's Athletics
Representing Algeria
African Games
Silver medal – second place	2015 Brazzaville	400 m hurdles
Bronze medal – third place	2015 Brazzaville	4x400 m relay
- Updated on 26 August 2016

Miloud Rahmani (born 30 December 1982) is an Algerian athlete specialsing in the 400 metres hurdles. He represented his country at the 2016 Olympic Games as well as the 2013 and 2015 World Championships without qualifying for the semifinals.

His personal best in the event is 49.34 seconds set in Mersin in 2013. His personal best over the flat 400 metres is 46.57 seconds set in Algiers in 2007.

== Competition record ==
Year	Competition	Venue	Position	Event	Notes
Representing Algeria
2007	All-Africa Games	Algiers, Algeria	12th (sf)	400 m	46.57
2007	All-Africa Games	Algiers, Algeria	5th	4 × 400 m relay	3:12.71
2007	Pan Arab Games	Cairo, Egypt	4th	400 m	46.99
2007	Pan Arab Games	Cairo, Egypt	4th	4 × 400 m relay	46.99
2009	Universiade	Belgrade, Serbia	15th (sf)	400 m	47.26
2009	Universiade	Belgrade, Serbia	8th	4 × 400 m relay	3:12.94
2011	All-Africa Games	Maputo, Mozambique	6th	400 m hurdles	52.00
2011	Pan Arab Games	Doha, Qatar	2nd	400 m hurdles	49.34
2013	Arab Championships	Doha, Qatar	1st	400 m hurdles	50.52
2013	Arab Championships	Doha, Qatar	3rd	4 × 400 m relay	3:11.02
2013	Mediterranean Games	Mersin, Turkey	2nd	400 m hurdles	49.34
2013	Mediterranean Games	Mersin, Turkey	4th	4 × 400 m relay	3:08.27
2013	World Championships	Moscow, Russia	30th (h)	400 m hurdles	50.79
2015	Arab Championships	Isa Town, Bahrain	3rd	400 m hurdles	50.52
2015	World Championships	Beijing, China	35th (h)	400 m hurdles	50.21
2015	African Games	Brazzaville, Republic of the Congo	2nd	400 m hurdles	49.27
2015	African Games	Brazzaville, Republic of the Congo	3rd	4 × 400 m relay	3:03.07
2016	Olympic Games	Rio de Janeiro, Brazil	27th (h)	400 m hurdles	49.73
2017	Arab Championships	Radès, Tunisia	2nd	400 m hurdles	49.56
2017	Arab Championships	Radès, Tunisia	1st	4 × 400 m relay	3:05.49
