= Abdelhamid Zerrifi =

Algerian steeplechase runner

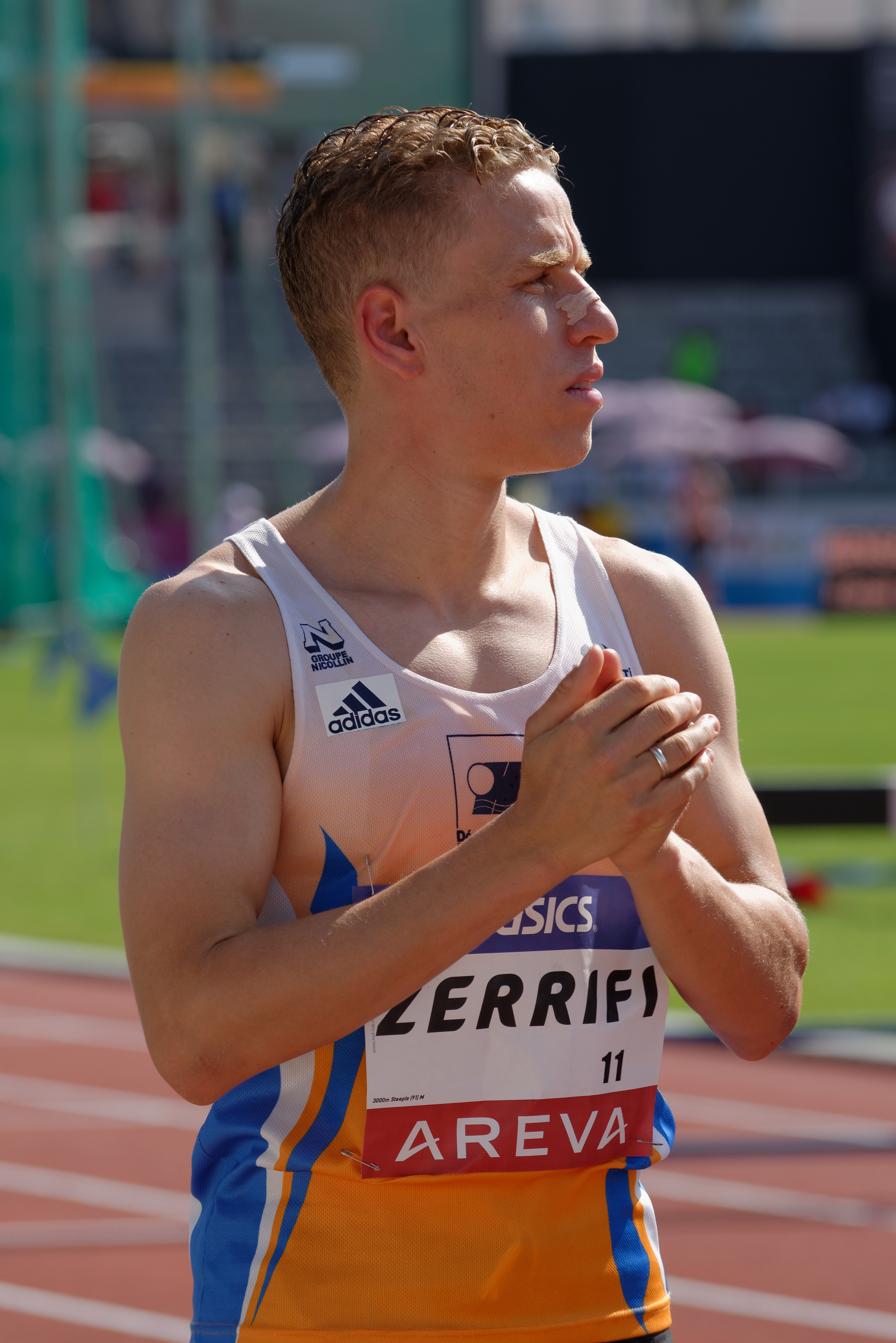
- Abdelhamid Zerrifi in 2013

Personal information
- Born: 20 June 1986 (age 39)

Sport
- Sport: Athletics
- Event: 3000 m steeplechase

Abdelhamid Zerrifi (born 20 June 1986) is an Algerian athlete specialising in the 3000 metres steeplechase. He represented his country at the 2013 and 2015 World Championships without qualifying for the final. His personal best in the event is 8:25.96 set in Paris Saint-Denis in 2013.

== Competition record ==
Year	Competition	Venue	Position	Event	Notes
Representing Algeria
2013	World Championships	Moscow, Russia	–	3000 m s'chase	DQ
2015	World Championships	Beijing, China	28th (h)	3000 m s'chase	8:51.89
