= Amina Bettiche =

Algerian steeplechase runner

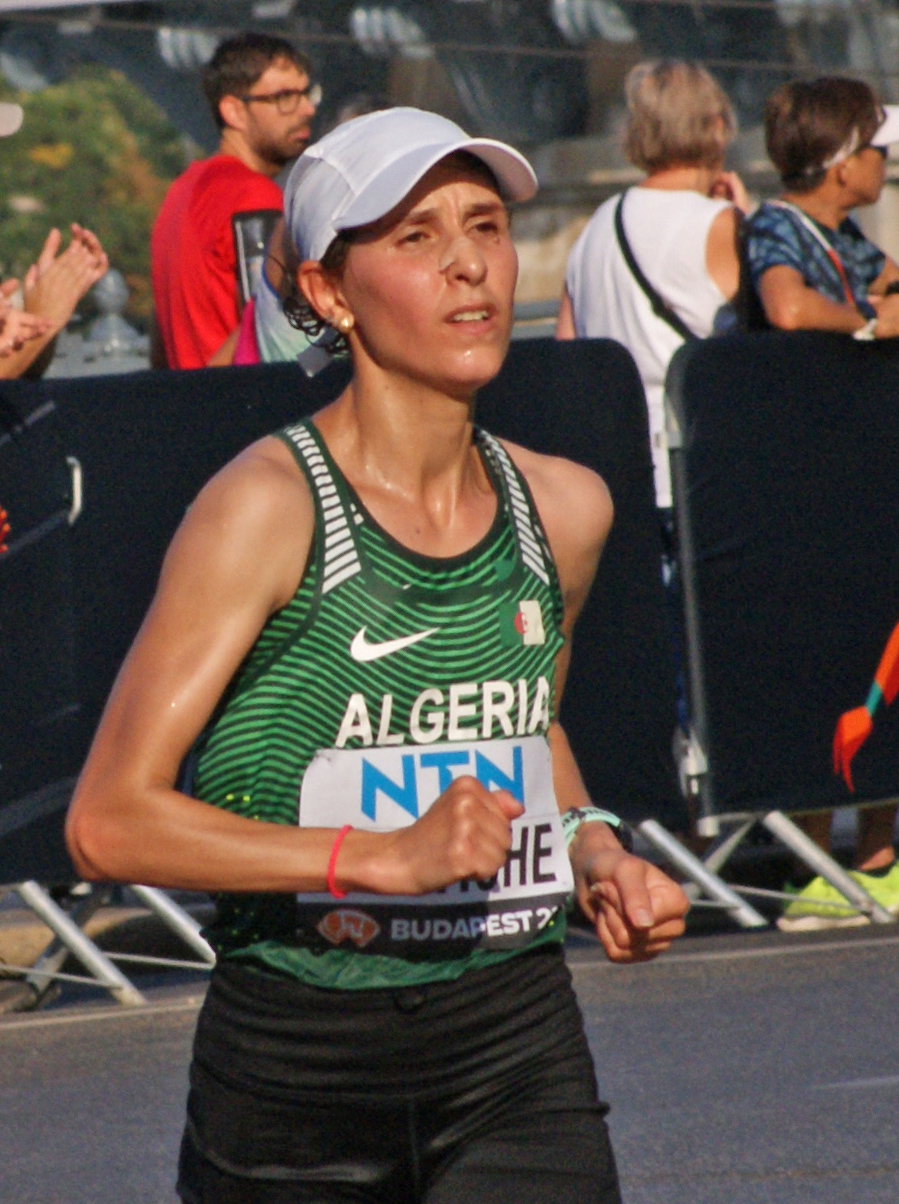

Personal information
- Nationality: Algerian
- Born: 14 November 1987 (age 38) Algeria
- Height: 1.65 m (5 ft 5 in)
- Weight: 55 kg (121 lb)

Sport
- Country: Algeria
- Sport: Athletics
- Event: 3000 meters steeplechase

Achievements and titles
- Personal bests: 3000 m st: 9:25.90 (2017) NR
Medal record
Mediterranean Games
Gold medal – first place	2013 Mersin	3000 m steeplechase
Islamic Solidarity Games
Silver medal – second place	2017 Baku	3000 m steeplechase

Amina Bettiche (born 14 December 1987) is an Algerian steeplechase runner. Bettiche won the gold medal at the 2013 Mediterranean Games. In 2017, she competed in the women's 3000 metres steeplechase event at the 2017 World Championships in Athletics held in London, United Kingdom. She did not advance to compete in the final.

== International competitions ==
Year	Competition	Venue	Position	Event	Notes
2013	Mediterranean Games	Mersin, Turkey	1st	3000 m steeplechase	9:40.71 GR
2017	Islamic Solidarity Games	Baku, Azerbaijan	2nd	3000 m steeplechase	9:25.90 NR
2022	Mediterranean Games	Oran, Algeria	9th	1500 m	4:18.55
2022	Mediterranean Games	Oran, Algeria	4th	3000 m steeplechase	9:37.18
2022	Islamic Solidarity Games	Konya, Turkey	4th	3000 m steeplechase	10:22:32
2023	World Championships	Budapest, Hungary	–	Marathon	DNF

== See also ==
- Algeria at the 2013 Mediterranean Games
