= Rabia Makhloufi =

Algerian steeplechase runner

Personal information
- Nationality: Algeria
- Born: 11 November 1986 (age 39) Ras El Oued, Algeria
- Height: 1.78 m (5 ft 10 in)
- Weight: 68 kg (150 lb)

Sport
- Sport: Athletics
- Event: Steeplechase

Achievements and titles
- Personal bests: 3000 m steeplechase: 9:47.88 (2008); 5000 m: 14:04.85 (2007)

Rabia Makhloufi (Arabic: ربيع مخلوف; born November 11, 1986) is an Algerian steeplechase runner. Makhloufi represented Algeria at the 2008 Summer Olympics in Beijing, where he competed for the men's 3000 metres steeplechase. He ran in the first heat against twelve other athletes, including France's Bouabdellah Tahri and Kenya's Brimin Kipruto, who eventually won the gold medal in the final. He finished the race in eighth place by six hundredths of a second (0.06) ahead of Japan's Yoshitaka Iwamizu, with a time of 8:29.74. Makhloufi, however, failed to advance into the final, as he placed twenty-fifth overall and was ranked farther below four mandatory slots for the next round.
