= List of Taiwanese records in athletics =

The following are the national records in athletics by Taiwan, competing as Chinese Taipei, maintained by Taiwan's national athletics federation: Chinese Taipei Athletics Association (CTAA).

== Outdoor ==
Key to tables: Awaiting ratification Record not kept by CTTFA

=== Men ===
Event	Record	Athlete	Date	Meet	Place	Ref.
100 m	10.11 (+0.2 m/s)	Yang Chun-han	16 June 2018	Japan University Games	Hiratsuka, Japan	
200 m	20.23 (+0.7 m/s)	Yang Chun-han	29 August 2018	Asian Games	Jakarta, Indonesia	
400 m	46.31	Wu Zheng-yan	7 June 2025	Taiwan Open	Taipei, Taiwan	
800 m	1:47.24	Wang Jung-hua	3 May 1980		Westwood, United States	
1500 m	3:45.26	Chien Tzu-Chieh	25 July 2025	All Japan High School Field Championships	Hiroshima, Japan	
3000 m	8:35.40	Hsu Li-hung	27 April 2024	Asian U20 Championships	Dubai, United Arab Emirates	
5000 m	13:54.42	Wu Wen-chien	10 October 2002	Asian Games	Busan, South Korea	
10,000 m	29:12.1 h	Hsu Gi-sheng	28 November 1993		Hachioji, Japan	
Half marathon	1:03:46	Chiang Chieh-wen	1 February 2015	Kagawa Marugame Half Marathon	Marugame, Japan	
Marathon	2:14:35	Hsu Gi-sheng	5 February 1995	Beppu-Ōita Marathon	Beppu–Ōita, Japan	
110 m hurdles	13.34 (+0.1 m/s)	Chen Kuei-ru	25 May 2019	Taiwan Athletics Open	Taipei City, Taiwan	
400 m hurdles	48.62	Peng Ming-yang	4 August 2023	Summer World University Games	Chengdu, China	
2000 m steeplechase	5:58.21	Zeng Ting-wei	21 August 2014	Youth Olympics	Nanjing, China	
3000 m steeplechase	8:34.76	Wu Wen-chien	9 October 2002	Asian Games	Busan, South Korea	
High jump	2.30 m	Yeh Po-ting	7 May 2024	National Intercollegiate Games	Taichung, Taiwan	
Pole vault	5.38 m	Lin Chih-cheng	24 September 2023	New Taipei City Cup Championships	New Taipei City, Taiwan	
Long jump	8.40 m (+0.3 m/s)	Lin Yu-tang	15 July 2023	Asian Championships	Bangkok, Thailand	
Triple jump	16.65 m NWI	Nai Hui-fang	18 November 1989	Asian Championships	New Delhi, India	
Shot put	20.58 m	Chang Ming-huang	19 August 2011	2nd High Performance Center Shot Put Competition	Athens, United States	
Discus throw	58.10 m	Wang Yao-hui	20 June 2010		Hiratsuka, Japan	
Hammer throw	69.68 m	Ho Chin-hsieng	26 May 2002		Taipei City, Taiwan	
Javelin throw	91.36 m	Cheng Chao-tsun	26 August 2017	Universiade	Taipei, Taiwan	
Decathlon	8010 pts h	Yang Chuan-kwang	27–28 April 1963	Mt. SAC Relays	Walnut, United States	
Decathlon	100m (wind) / Long jump (wind) / Shot put / High jump / 400m / 110m H (wind) / Discus / Pole vault / Javelin / 1500m; 10.7 / 7.17 m / 13.22 m / 1.92 m / 47.7 / 14.0 / 40.99 m / 4.84 m / 71.75 m / 5:02.4					
5 km walk (road)	21:45+	Hsu Chia-wei	19 March 2023	Asian Race Walking Championships	Nomi, Japan	
10,000 m walk (track)	41:45.90	Hsu Chia-wei	8 May 2023	National College Games	Taoyuan, Taiwan	
10 km walk (road)	42:16	Lo Sheng-chin	1 January 2025	New Year Race Walk	Tokyo, Japan	
15 km walk (road)	1:06:46+	Hsu Chia-wei	19 March 2023	Asian Race Walking Championships	Nomi, Japan	
20 km walk (road)	1:25:01	Hsu Chia-wei	1 January 2025	New Year Race Walk	Tokyo, Japan	
50 km walk (road)	4:10:13 (Note: not ratified by CTTFA but recognised by World Athletics)	Chang Wei-lin	5 May 2018	World Race Walking Team Championships	Taicang, China	
4 × 100 m relay	38.41	Chinese Taipei; Po-Hsiang Lai; Wen-Pu Chen; Zuo-Jyun Huang; Wu-Yen-Ming Ke	21 June 2026	Asian Relay Championships	Shaoxing, China	
4 × 100 m relay	38.32	Chinese Taipei; Po-Hsiang Lai; Wen-Pu Chen; Zuo-Jyun Huang; Chun-Han Yang	28 September 2026	Asian Games	Nagoya, Japan	
4 × 400 m relay	3:06.51	Chinese Taipei; Wang Wei-hsu; Yang Lung-hsiang; Yu Chen-Yi; Chen Chieh	9 July 2017	Asian Championships	Bhubaneswar, India	

=== Women ===
Event	Record	Athlete	Date	Meet	Place	Ref.
100 y	10.0 h NWI	Chi Cheng	13 June 1970		Portland, United States	
100 m	11.22 (+1.9 m/s)	Chi Cheng	18 July 1970		Vienna, Austria	
200 m	22.56 (−0.3 m/s)	Wang Huei-chen	30 October 1992		Yilan City, Taiwan	
400 m	52.74	Chi Cheng	29 July 1970	DN Galan	Stockholm, Sweden	
800 m	2:04.74	Li Ya-hui	21 July 1998	Asian Championships	Fukuoka, Japan	
1500 m	4:22.8 h	Lee Chiu-hsia	17 May 1975		Bakersfield, United States	
3000 m	9:37.68	Lee Su-mei	24 June 1979		Bloomington, United States	
5000 m	16:10.20	Hsieh Chien-ho	1 June 2019		Yokohama, Japan	
5 km (road)	16:58+	Hsieh Chien-ho	28 January 2018	Osaka Half Marathon	Osaka, Japan	
10,000 m	33:39.90	Xie Qianhe	9 March 2021	National Youth Cup	New Taipei City, Taiwan	
10 km (road)	34:01+	Hsieh Chien-ho	28 January 2018	Osaka Half Marathon	Osaka, Japan	
15 km (road)	51:21+	Hsieh Chien-ho	28 January 2018	Osaka Half Marathon	Osaka, Japan	
20 km (road)	1:08:35+	Hsieh Chien-ho	28 January 2018	Osaka Half Marathon	Osaka, Japan	
Half marathon	1:12:19	Hsieh Chien-ho	28 January 2018	Osaka Half Marathon	Osaka, Japan	
25 km (road)	1:31:40+	Tsao Chun-yu	3 March 2019	Tokyo Marathon	Tokyo, Japan	
30 km (road)	1:50:02+	Tsao Chun-yu	3 March 2019	Tokyo Marathon	Tokyo, Japan	
Marathon	2:32:41	Tsao Chun-yu	20 December 2020	Taipei Marathon	Taipei City, Taiwan	
100 m hurdles	12.93 (+1.1 m/s)	Chi Cheng	12 July 1970		Munich, West Germany	
400 m hurdles	55.71	Hsu Pei-chin	17 December 1998	Asian Games	Bangkok, Thailand	
3000 m steeplechase	10:33.02	Chen Chao-chun	22 October 2019	National Games	Taoyuan, Taiwan	
High jump	1.90 m	Li Ching-ching	18 October 2021	National Games	New Taipei City, Taiwan	
Pole vault	4.20 m	Wu Chia-ju	6 May 2018	Thailand Open	Bangkok, Thailand	
Long jump	6.56 m (+0.4 m/s)	Wang Kuo-huei	5 November 1997		Bangkok, Thailand	
Triple jump	13.63 m (+1.3 m/s)	Wang Kuo-huei	26 December 1999		Taoyuan City, Taiwan	
Shot put	17.48 m	Lin Chia-ying	27 September 2014	Asian Games	Incheon, South Korea	
Discus throw	60.23 m	Li Wen-hua	25 May 2012		Taipei, Taiwan	
Hammer throw	67.32 m	Yu Ya-chien	14 April 2023	Beach Invitational	Long Beach, United States	
Javelin throw	57.15 m	Li Huei-chun	18 February 2019		Kaohsiung, Taiwan	
Heptathlon	5786 pts	Ma Chun-ping	10–11 October 1994	Asian Games	Hiroshima, Japan	
Heptathlon	100m H (wind) / High jump / Shot put / 200m (wind) / Long jump (wind) / Javelin / 800m; 14.32 / 1.84 m / 12.57 m / 25.42 / 5.86 m / 41.78 m / 2:24.19					
5 km walk (road)	23:04	Chiang Chia-jou	1 January 2020	U20 New Year Race Walk	Tokyo, Japan	
10,000 m walk (track)	48:00.72	Huang Kuan-ling	8 May 2023	National College Games	Taoyuan, Taiwan	
10 km walk (road)	48:05+	Chang Chia-feng	20 March 2016	Asian Race Walking Championships	Nomi, Japan	
15 km walk (road)	1:13:44+	Chang Chia-feng	20 March 2016	Asian Race Walking Championships	Nomi, Japan	
20,000 m walk (track)	1:40:44.9 h	Chang Chia-feng	20 October 2013	National Games	Taipei, Taiwan	
20 km walk (road)	1:39:32	Chiang Chia-jou	20 October 2019	National Games	Taoyuan, Taiwan	
50 km walk (road)						
4 × 100 m relay	44.53	Chinese Taipei; Zheng Xin-ying; Hu Chun-wei; Liu Li-lin; Zhang Bo-ya	7 June 2025	Taiwan Open	New Taipei City, Taiwan	
4 × 400 m relay	3:39.88	Chinese Taipei; Hsu Yi-ling; Shen Su-feng; Jen Fen-ruu; Lai Lee-chiao	29 September 1985	Asian Championships	Jakarta, Indonesia	

=== Mixed ===
Event	Record	Athlete	Date	Meet	Place	Ref.
4 × 400 m relay	3:25.73		24 October 2023	National Games	Tainan, Taiwan	

== Indoor ==
=== Men ===
Event	Record	Athlete	Date	Meet	Place	Ref.
60 m	6.60	Chen Wen-pu	6 February 2026	Asian Championships	Tianjin, China	
200 m	21.66	Yang Chun-han	16 February 2019		Winston-Salem, United States	
200 m	21.56	Landen Cheng-Hsin Liu	11 March 2023	NCAA Division 3 Championships	Birmingham, United States	
400 m	49.39	Chen Chih-hsuan	10 February 2006	Asian Championships	Pattaya, Thailand	
800 m	2:01.31	Chen Fu-pin	10 February 2006	Asian Championships	Pattaya, Thailand	
1500 m	4:02.68	Chen Fu-pin	8 February 2004	Asian Championships	Tehran, Iran	
3000 m	8:14.61 (Note: outdoor mark ratified as absolute record)	Wu Wen-chien	14 March 2003	World Championships	Birmingham, United Kingdom	
60 m hurdles	7.67	Chen Kuei-ju	20 March 2022	World Championships	Belgrade, Serbia	
High jump	2.15 m	Fu Chao-hsuan	6 February 2026	Asian Championships	Tianjin, China	
Pole vault	5.30 m A	Hsieh Chia-han	18 January 2014		Reno, United States	
Long jump	8.02 m	Lin Yu-tang	12 February 2023	Asian Championships	Astana, Kazakhstan	
Triple jump	15.69 m	Nai Hui-fang	11 February 1989		Osaka, Japan	
Shot put	19.55 m	Chang Ming-huang	2 November 2009	Asian Indoor Games	Hanoi, Vietnam	
Heptathlon	5563 pts	Hsiao Szu-pin	12 February 2006	Asian Championships	Pattaya, Thailand	
Heptathlon	60m / Long jump / Shot put / High jump / 60m H / Pole vault / 1000m; 7.12 / 6.82 m / 13.94 m / 2.01 m / 8.40 / 4.70 m / 2:55.26					
5000 m walk						
4 × 400 m relay						

=== Women ===
Event	Record	Athlete	Date	Meet	Place	Ref.
60 m	7.30	Liao Yan-chun	7 February 2026	Asian Championships	Tianjin, China	
200 m	23.81	Wang Huei-chen	9 March 1991	World Championships	Seville, Spain	
400 m	57.38 A	Renee Yang	28 January 2023	New Mexico Team Open	Albuquerque, United States	
800 m	2:35.15	Chu Chia-ling	23 March 2018		Beijing, China	
1500 m						
3000 m						
60 m hurdles	8.07	Zhang Bo-ya	8 March 2026	National Grand Prix 1	Xi'an, China	
High jump	1.84 m	Su Chun-yueh	4 March 1989	World Championships	Budapest, Hungary	
Pole vault	4.05 m	Wu Chia-ju	21 March 2018		Caotun, Taiwan	
Long jump	6.42 m	Chi Cheng	27 February 1970		New York City, United States	
Triple jump	12.61 m	Wang Kuo-huei	8 February 2004	Asian Championships	Tehran, Iran	
Shot put	16.52 m	Lin Chia-ying	15 February 2014	Asian Championships	Hangzhou, China	
Pentathlon	3739 pts	Chu Chia-ling	23 March 2018		Beijing, China	
Pentathlon	60m H / High jump / Shot put / Long jump / 800m; 8.72 / 1.66 m / 11.41 m / 5.54 m / 2:35.15					
3000 m walk						
4 × 400 m relay						
