= 2003 World Championships in Athletics – Men's 5000 metres =

The Men's 5000 metres event at the 2003 IAAF World Championships in Paris, France on Sunday 31 August 2003 at 18:40h. There were a total number of 29 participating athletes, with two qualifying heats held prior to the final. Eliud Kipchoge won the race, followed by the Hicham El Guerrouj and Kenenisa Bekele. The race has received enduring attention because the three medalists–– Kipchoge, El Guerrouj, and Bekele–– are often considered among the greatest runners in history.

The winning margin was 0.04 seconds which as of 2024 remains the only time the men's 5,000 metres was won by less than 0.1 seconds at these championships.

== Summary ==
The competitors for the race included the 1500 meter champion/world record holder, Hicham El Guerrouj and the 10,000 meter champion Kenenisa Bekele. This was considered a meeting ground half way. From the start, Bekele took the race out to let his endurance burn off the faster opponent. El Guerrouj immediately marked his move. Also along for the ride were two more Ethiopians and a pack of four Kenyans, including defending champion Richard Limo. While the group broke away from the field, the fast early pace slowed. With two laps to go, it was El Guerrouj who took out the lead. The next lap burnt off a couple of Ethiopians but the Kenyans were all there with Bekele, still in contact with El Guerrouj.

As the final lap quickened, world junior record holder, eighteen year old Eliud Kipchoge rode on El Guerrouj's shoulder, with Bekele chasing in third. El Guerrouj opened up a gap of 3 metres down the back stretch, with Bekele gaining on Kipchoge, the rest of the Kenyan team strung out behind. Challenged by Bekele, Kipchoge accelerated through the turn, moving up to El Guerrouj's shoulder. With Bekele moving onto Kipchoge's shoulder, it was three abreast coming off the turn and John Kibowen tailing closely behind. El Guerrouj accelerated again but Kipchoge didn't go away. On the outside Bekele made up some ground, the three separated by a metre. But El Guerrouj and Kipchoge were dead even. As Bekele couldn't make up any more ground, Kipchoge gained a few inches on El Guerrouj. Over the last few steps, El Guerrouj struggled and lost his form, trying to make a desperate dive at the line, but it was too little too late. The final lap was 53 seconds.

By this point in time, none of the three medalists had achieved an Olympic gold medal, though ultimately all three would. The same three would match up the following year in the 2004 Olympics with El Guerrouj taking gold, Bekele silver, and Kipchoge bronze.

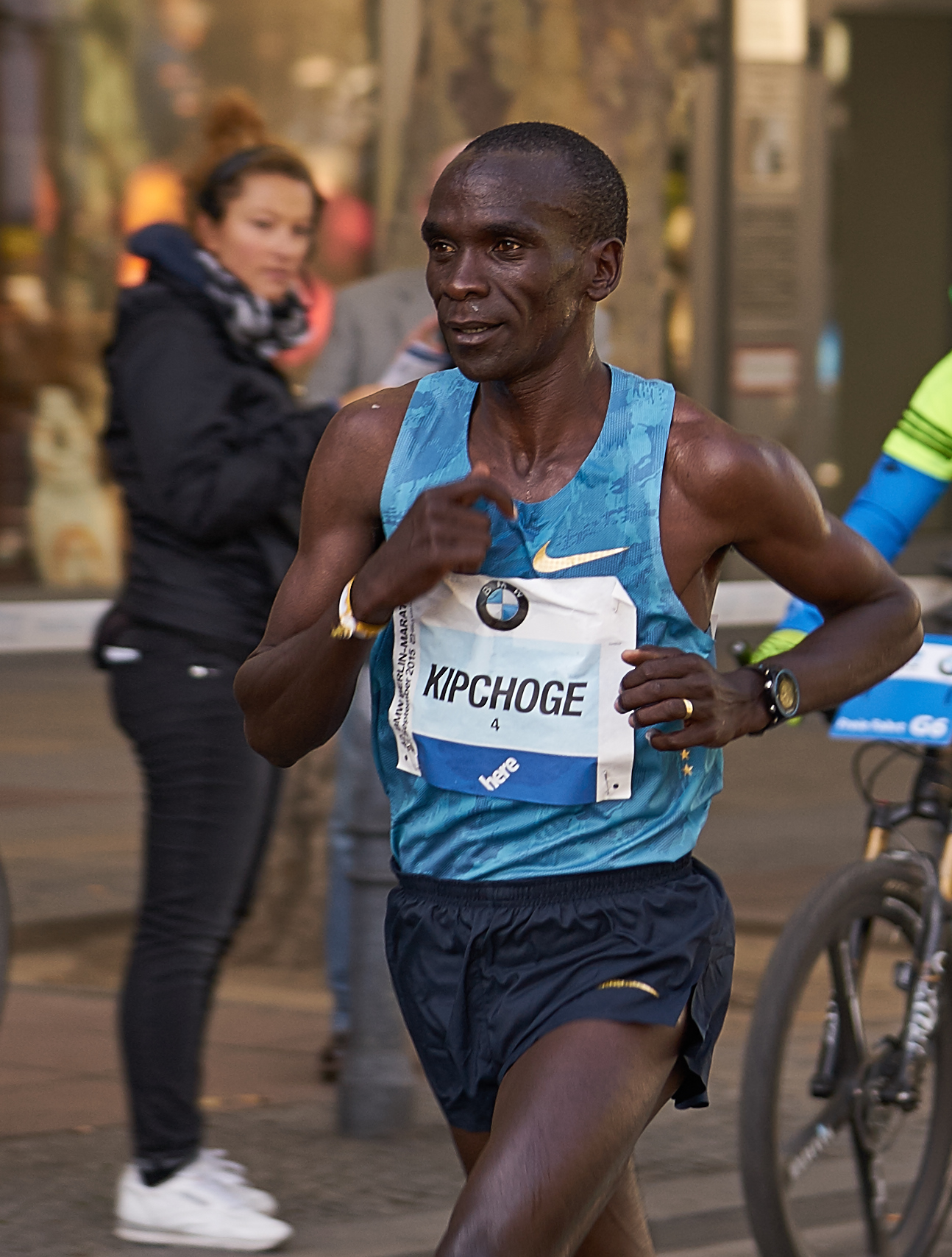
Eliud Kipchoge

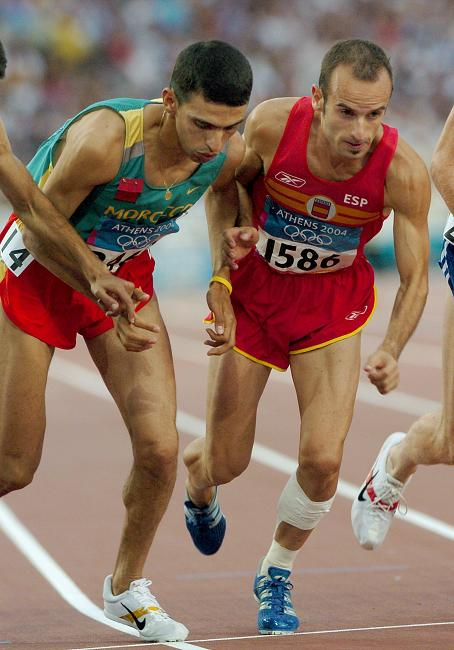
Hicham El Guerrouj

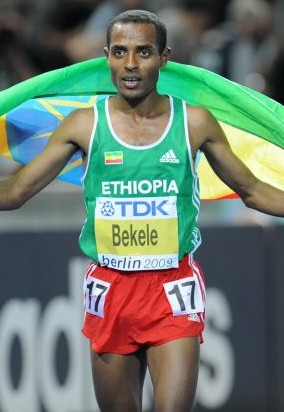
Kenenisa Bekele

== Analysis ==
The race has captured the attention of many fans of Track and Field because it featured a matchup between athletes who had set or would go on to set world records in multiple distances. The first-place finisher in the race, Eliud Kipchoge, went on to hold the world record in the marathon from 2018 to 2023 and to win two Olympic gold medalists in the marathon. Hicham El Guerrouj, the second-place finisher, set world records in the 1500 metres and mile, while the third-place finisher, Kenenisa Bekele, set world records in the 5000 metres and 10000 metres.

The three legends — one present, two future — battled for 50 meters, El Guerrouj in lane 1, Kipchoge in lane 2, and Bekele a little further removed in lane 3. It became evident midway down the home straight that [Bekele] was outmatched in this kick.

— Johnathon Gault, writing for LetsRun.com

== Final ==
RANK	FINAL	TIME
	Eliud Kipchoge (KEN)	12:52.79
	Hicham El Guerrouj (MAR)	12:52.83
	Kenenisa Bekele (ETH)	12:53.12
4.	John Kibowen (KEN)	12:54.07
5.	Abraham Chebii (KEN)	12:57.74
6.	Gebregziabher Gebremariam (ETH)	12:58.08
7.	Richard Limo (KEN)	13:01.13
8.	Zersenay Tadese (ERI)	13:05.57
9.	Juan Carlos de la Ossa (ESP)	13:21.04
10.	Abderrahim Goumri (MAR)	13:23.67
11.	Abiyote Abate (ETH)	13:23.81
12.	Alejandro Suárez (MEX)	13:24.51
13.	Christian Belz (SUI)	13:26.02
14.	Moukheld Al-Outaibi (KSA)	13:38.92
15.	Jorge Torres (USA)	13:43.37

== Heats ==
- Held on Thursday 28 August 2003

RANK	HEAT 1	TIME
1.	Kenenisa Bekele (ETH)	13:38.03
2.	Eliud Kipchoge (KEN)	13:38.73
3.	John Kibowen (KEN)	13:40.72
4.	Abderrahim Goumri (MAR)	13:42.09
5.	Juan Carlos de la Ossa (ESP)	13:42.23
6.	Zersenay Tadese (ERI)	13:42.41
7.	Boniface Kiprop (UGA)	13:42.88
8.	Salah Hissou (MAR)	13:44.27
9.	Erik Sjöqvist (SWE)	13:55.89
10.	Khoudir Aggoune (ALG)	13:56.41
11.	Yawo Kloutse (TOG)	14:45.85
—	Fabiano Joseph Naasi (TAN)	DNS
—	Michael Aish (NZL)	DNS
—	Cathal Lombard (IRL)	DNS

RANK	HEAT 2	TIME
1.	Gebregziabher Gebremariam (ETH)	13:32.46
2.	Abraham Chebii (KEN)	13:32.54
3.	Richard Limo (KEN)	13:32.82
4.	Hicham El Guerrouj (MAR)	13:32.88
5.	Abiyote Abate (ETH)	13:33.24
6.	Moukheld Al-Outaibi (KSA)	13:33.91
7.	Christian Belz (SUI)	13:36.54
8.	Alejandro Suárez (MEX)	13:41.97
9.	Jorge Torres (USA)	13:42.42
10.	Abdulhak Elgorche Zakaria (BHR)	13:44.15
11.	Hassan Mourhit (BEL)	14:09.14
12.	Eduardo Buenavista (PHI)	14:12.55
—	Ahmad Hassan Abdullah (QAT)	DNS
—	Kamiel Maase (NED)	DNS
—	John Yuda Msuri (TAN)	DNS

== See also ==
- Athletics at the 2003 Pan American Games - Men's 5000 metres
