= Athletics at the 2002 Asian Games – Men's 10,000 metres =

Men's 10,000 metres at the 2002 Asian Games
- Venue: Busan Asiad Main Stadium
- Dates: 7 October 2002
- Competitors: 13 from 9 nations

Medalists
gold medal	Mukhlid Al-Otaibi	Saudi Arabia
silver medal	Ahmed Ibrahim Warsama	Qatar
bronze medal	Abdelhak Zakaria	Bahrain

The men's 10,000 metres competition at the 2002 Asian Games in Busan, South Korea was held on 7 October at the Busan Asiad Main Stadium.

== Schedule ==
All times are Korea Standard Time (UTC+09:00)

Date	Time	Event
Monday, 7 October 2002	15:50	Final

== Records ==
Prior to this competition, the existing world, Asian and Games records were as follows.

World Record	Haile Gebrselassie (ETH)	26:22.75	Hengelo, Netherlands	1 June 1998
Asian Record	Toshinari Takaoka (JPN)	27:35.09	Palo Alto, United States	4 May 2001
Games Record	Toshinari Takaoka (JPN)	28:15.48	Hiroshima, Japan	10 October 1994

== Results ==
Legend

- DNF — Did not finish
- DNS — Did not start

Rank	Athlete	Time	Notes
1st place, gold medalist(s)	Mukhlid Al-Otaibi (KSA)	28:41.89	
2nd place, silver medalist(s)	Ahmed Ibrahim Warsama (QAT)	28:43.53	
3rd place, bronze medalist(s)	Abdelhak Zakaria (BRN)	28:46.11	
4	Alyan Al-Qahtani (KSA)	28:50.39	
5	Awad Aman Majid (QAT)	28:50.84	
6	Atsushi Sato (JPN)	28:58.57	
7	Tomoo Tsubota (JPN)	28:59.83	
8	Eduardo Buenavista (PHI)	29:02.36	
9	Ji Young-jun (KOR)	29:15.03	
10	Esam Salah Juaim (YEM)	31:06.19	
11	Cho Keun-hyung (KOR)	31:45.70	
—	Gulab Chand (IND)	DNF	
—	Bat-Ochiryn Ser-Od (MGL)	DNS	
