= 2011 Asian Athletics Championships – Men's 3000 metres steeplechase =

The men's 3000 metres steeplechase at the 2011 Asian Athletics Championships was held at the Kobe Universiade Memorial Stadium on the 8 of July.

== Medalists ==
Gold	Abubaker Ali Kamal; Qatar
Silver	Artem Kossinov; Kazakhstan
Bronze	Tareq Mubarak Taher; Bahrain

== Records ==
2011 Asian Athletics Championships
World record	Saif Saaeed Shaheen (QAT)	7:53.63	Brussels, Belgium	3 September 2004
Asian record	Saif Saaeed Shaheen (QAT)	7:53.63	Brussels, Belgium	3 September 2004
Championship record	Khamis Abdullah Saifeldin (QAT)	8:16.0	Colombo, Sri Lanka	2002

=== Final ===
Rank	Name	Nationality	Time	Notes
1st place, gold medalist(s)	Abubaker Ali Kamal	Qatar	8:30.23	
2nd place, silver medalist(s)	Artem Kossinov	Kazakhstan	8:35.11	
3rd place, bronze medalist(s)	Tareq Mubarak Taher	Bahrain	8:45.47	
4	Ramachandran Ramdas	India	8:46.08	
5	Tsuyoshi Takeda	Japan	8:48.21	
6	Hiroyoshi Umegae	Japan	8:55.01	
7	Hossein Keyhani	Iran	9:04.23	
8	Rene Herrera	Philippines	9:12.34	
9	Aoi Matsumoto	Japan	9:25.65	
	Muhammad Al Quraisy	Indonesia	DQ	
	Edwin Chibii Kimurer	Brunei	DQ	
