= Yasunori Uchitomi =

Japanese long-distance runner

Personal information
- Born: 29 October 1972 (age 53)

Sport
- Sport: Track and field
Medal record
Representing Japan
Asian Games
Bronze medal – third place	1994 Hiroshima	3000 m steeplechase
Gold medal – first place	1998 Bangkok	3000 m steeplechase
Asian Championships
Silver medal – second place	1998 Fukuoka	3000 m steeplechase
Bronze medal – third place	2003 Manila	3000 m steeplechase
East Asian Games
Gold medal – first place	1997 Busan	3000 m steeplechase
Gold medal – first place	2001 Osaka	3000 m steeplechase
Silver medal – second place	2005 Macau	3000 m steeplechase

Yasunori Uchitomi (Japanese: 内冨 恭則; born 29 October 1972), is a Japanese former long-distance runner who specialized in the 3000 meters steeplechase. His personal best for the event is 8:26.48 minutes, set in 1997.

He was one of Japan's top steeplechasers during his career, taking three titles at the Japan Championships in Athletics and six at the Japanese National Games. His greatest achievement was a gold medal at the 1998 Asian Games, having won bronze four years earlier. He was twice a medalist at the Asian Athletics Championships (silver in 1998, bronze in 2003). He had much success at the East Asian Games, winning back-to-back titles in 1997 to 2001 with games record times before finally taking silver in 2005 (his last international performance).

Uchitomi also represented Japan at the IAAF World Cross Country Championships in 1999 and was a corporate team runner for Chugoku Electric Power Company, winning several Japan corporate titles.

== Career ==
Uchitomi established himself at the national level in 1993 when he won the 1500 metres title at the Japanese National Games. He had his first successes in the 3000 meters steeplechase during the 1994 track season. He set a personal best of 8:33.04 minutes at the Japan Championships in Athletics, then went on to take his first major medal at the 1994 Asian Games, held in Hiroshima. He won the national title in the steeplechase for the first time in 1995. He retained that title the following year with a personal best run of 8:30.16 minutes and also took the Japanese Games title that year.

Uchitomi reached his athletic peak in 1997 and set lifetime bests of 3:43.13 minutes for the 1500 m and 8:26.48 minutes for the steeplechase (the latter mark coming as part of another National Games win). A steeplechase gold medal at the 1997 East Asian Games in a games record marked his first international title in the sport. His run of success in the steeplechase continued into 1998. First, he took the silver medal at the 1998 Asian Athletics Championships in Fukuoka, finishing behind Saudi Arabia's Saad Al-Asmari. At the FBK Games in Hengelo he ran the second-fastest time of his career at 8:28.04 minutes. His form maintained until December, he took the highest accolade of his career at the 1998 Asian Games with a gold medal-winning performance.

He made his international debut on grass at the 1999 IAAF World Cross Country Championships, but was outside of the top 100 of the men's short race. He was runner-up at the Japanese Championships that year, but returned to the fore in 2000 with wins at both the national championships and games. The emergence of Yoshitaka Iwamizu at the 2001 Japanese Championships marked a generational change. Although Uchitomi ran a time of 8:29.63 minutes (third best in his career), he was beaten by Iwamizu, who would go on to win five consecutive titles. Uchitomi defended his title at the 2001 East Asian Games and improved his own games record to 8:33.98 minutes, beating compatriot Wataru Izumi into second place as he had in 1997. He also took the steeplechase title for the Chugoku Electric Power Company at the All-Japan Corporate Track and Field Championships.

Running for his corporate team, helped Chugoku Electric to second place at the New Year Ekiden in January 2002. He won the corporate steeplechase title for a second year running but was again runner-up at the national championships. He aimed to defend his title at the 2002 Asian Games but finished outside the medals in fifth place – his time of 8:41.02 minutes being his fastest that year. He showed strong form at the 2002 Japanese Championships with a run of 8:30.52 minutes behind Iwamizu. He was back within the major medals at the 2003 Asian Athletics Championships, where he took bronze in a tactic race as Japan's sole representative. He ended the year with victories at the corporate championships and the Japanese Games.

His 2004 season did not feature any major competitions and he placed in the top three nationally. He had his last international outings the year after, coming fourth at the 2005 Asian Athletics Championships and taking the silver medal at the 2005 East Asian Games, missing out on a third straight title due to his national rival Iwamizu. He won his sixth, and final, steeplechase title at the Japanese National Games that October. Reaching his mid-thirties, he had his last season in 2006 after finishing out of the top ten at the national championships.

== International competitions ==
Year	Competition	Venue	Position	Event	Notes
1994	Asian Games	Hiroshima, Japan	3rd	3000 m s'chase	
1995	Universiade	Fukuoka, Japan	14th	3000 m s'chase	8:50.84
1997	East Asian Games	Busan, South Korea	1st	3000 m chase	
1998	Asian Championships	Fukuoka, Japan	2nd	3000 m s'chase	
1998	Asian Games	Bangkok, Thailand	1st	3000 m s'chase	
1999	World Cross Country Championships	Belfast, United Kingdom	113th	Short race	
2001	East Asian Games	Osaka, Japan	1st	3000 m s'chase	8:33.98 GR
2002	Asian Games	Busan, South Korea	5th	3000 m s'chase	
2003	Asian Championships	Manila, Philippines	3rd	3000 m s'chase	
2005	Asian Championships	Incheon, South Korea	4th	3000 m s'chase	
2005	East Asian Games	Macau, China	2nd	3000 m s'chase	

== National titles ==
- Japanese National Games (6 titles): 1996, 1997, 2000, 2001, 2003, 2005
- Japan Championships in Athletics (4 titles)
  - 1500 metres: 1993
  - 3000 m steeplechase: 1995, 1996, 2000

== Personal bests ==
- 1500 metres – 3:43.13 min (1997)
- 3000 metres – 7:56.53 min (1998)
- 5000 metres – 13:37.80 min (2001)
- 10,000 metres – 28:55.00 min (2000)
- Half marathon – 62:52 min (2003)
- 3000 metres steeplechase – 8:26.48 min (1997)
