= Athletics at the 2002 Asian Games – Men's 3000 metres steeplechase =

Men's 3000 metres steeplechase at the 2002 Asian Games
- Venue: Busan Asiad Main Stadium
- Dates: 9 October 2002
- Competitors: 10 from 8 nations

Medalists
| gold medal | Khamis Abdullah Saifeldin | Qatar |
| silver medal | Yoshitaka Iwamizu | Japan |
| silver medal | Abubaker Ali Kamal | Qatar |

The men's 3000 metres steeplechase competition at the 2002 Asian Games in Busan, South Korea was held on 9 October at the Busan Asiad Main Stadium.

== Schedule ==
All times are Korea Standard Time (UTC+09:00)

| Date | Time | Event |
|---|---|---|
| Wednesday, 9 October 2002 | 14:00 | Final |

== Records ==
Prior to this competition, the existing world, Asian and Games records were as follows.

| World Record | ~~Brahim Boulami (MAR)~~; Brahim Boulami (MAR) | ~~7:53.17~~; 7:55.28 | ~~Stockholm, Sweden~~; Brussels, Belgium | ~~16 August 2002~~; 24 August 2001 |
| Asian Record | Saad Al-Asmari (KSA) | 8:08.14 | Stockholm, Sweden | 16 July 2002 |
| Games Record | Sun Ripeng (CHN) | 8:31.73 | Hiroshima, Japan | 14 October 1994 |

- Brahim Boulami's world record was rescinded in 2003.

== Results ==
Legend

- DNS — Did not start

| Rank | Athlete | Time | Notes |
|---|---|---|---|
| 1st place, gold medalist(s) | Khamis Abdullah Saifeldin (QAT) | 8:30.52 | GR |
| 2nd place, silver medalist(s) | Yoshitaka Iwamizu (JPN) | 8:31.75 | |
| 2nd place, silver medalist(s) | Abubaker Ali Kamal (QAT) | 8:31.75 | |
| 4 | Wu Wen-chien (TPE) | 8:34.76 | |
| 5 | Yasunori Uchitomi (JPN) | 8:41.02 | |
| 6 | Huh In-ku (KOR) | 8:58.91 | |
| 7 | Hassan Al-Asmari (KSA) | 9:00.75 | |
| 8 | Madan Raj Giri (NEP) | 9:22.17 | |
| 9 | Nozimjon Irmatov (TJK) | 10:00.48 | |
| — | Eduardo Buenavista (PHI) | DNS | |
