= 2002 Asian Athletics Championships – Men's 5000 metres =

The men's 5000 metres event at the 2002 Asian Athletics Championships was held in Colombo, Sri Lanka on 12 August.

== Results ==
Rank	Name	Nationality	Time	Notes
1st place, gold medalist(s)	Khamis Abdullah Saifeldin	Qatar	14:16.81	
2nd place, silver medalist(s)	Abdelhak Zakaria	Bahrain	14:19.92	
3rd place, bronze medalist(s)	Nasser Suleiman	Qatar	14:19.97	
4	Mukhlid Al-Otaibi	Saudi Arabia	14:21.36	
5	Wu Wen-Chien	Chinese Taipei	14:25.16	
6	Eduardo Buenavista	Philippines	14:36.84	
7	Gojen Singh	India	14:37.90	
8	Mehdi Zarenezhad	Iran	14:48.61	PB
	Shivananda Alagawadi	India	DNF	
