= 2000 Asian Athletics Championships – Men's 3000 metres steeplechase =

The men's 3000 metres steeplechase event at the 2000 Asian Athletics Championships was held in Jakarta, Indonesia on 29 August.

== Results ==
Rank	Name	Nationality	Time	Notes
1st place, gold medalist(s)	Khamis Abdullah Saifeldin	Qatar	8:47.33	
2nd place, silver medalist(s)	Hassan Ali Al-Asmari	Saudi Arabia	8:52.85	
3rd place, bronze medalist(s)	Hamid Sadjadi	Iran	8:54.07	
4	Eduardo Buenavista	Philippines	8:54.99	
5	Takeshi Yamamoto	Japan	8:55.21	
6	Wu Wen-Chien	Chinese Taipei	8:56.74	
7	Abolfazl Mhmoudian	Iran	9:08.53	
8	Sun Wenli	China	9:11.86	
9	Ganesan Elangovan	Singapore	9:26.55	
10	Faturachman	Indonesia	9:34.26	
11	Djamshed Rasulov	Tajikistan	9:34.36	
