= Hsu Chia-wei =

Taiwanese race walker (born 2000)

Hsu Chia-wei 許嘉維
Personal information
- Nationality: Republic of China (Taiwan)
- Born: 12 September 2000 (age 25) Hsinchu, Taiwan
- Education: National Taiwan Sport University

Sport
- Sport: Athletics
- Event: Racewalking
- Coached by: Hsu Gi-sheng

Achievements and titles
- Personal best: 20km RaceWalk: 1:26:47 NR 10000m Racewalk: 41:45.90 NR
Medal record
Men's Athletics
Representing Chinese Taipei

Hsu Chia-wei (Chinese: 許嘉維; born 12 September 2000) is a Taiwanese race walker. He holds the national record of 10,000 metres racewalk and 20km racewalk of Taiwan; he graduated from the National Taiwan University of Sport in 2023.

== Competitions ==
Year	Competition	Venue	Position	Event	Notes
Representing Chinese Taipei
2023	47th All Japan Race Walking in Nomi, Nomi - Asian Race Walking Ch.	Nomi, Japan	7th	20km race walk	1:29:59
2023	Asian Athletics Championships, Supachalasai National Stadium, Bangkok	Bangkok, Thailand	6th	20km race walk	1:31:30
2023	19th Asian Games, Qiantang River Green Belt, Hangzhou	Hangzhou, China	7th	20km race walk	1:31:19
2024	2024 World Athletics Race Walking Team Championships, Antalya	Antalya, Turkey	56th	20km race walk	1:27:13
Representing Hsinchu Guangwu Junior High School
2015	2015 National Middle School Athletic Games	New Taipei City, Taiwan	3rd	3000 metres race walk	13:44.25
Representing Hsinchu Cheng De High School
2019	2019 National Middle School Athletic Games	Kaohsiung, Taiwan	1st	10,000 metres race walk	46:24.39
Representing NTUS
2020	2020 National University and College Athletic Games	Kaohsiung, Taiwan	1st	10,000 metres race walk	47:15.87
2020	2020 Wind City Racewalking Championship Cup	Hsinchu, Taiwan	1st	20km race walk	1:35:41
2021	2021 National Intercollegiate Athletic Open	New Taipei City, Taiwan	1st	10,000 metres race walk	43:28.86
2021	2021 National University and College Athletic Games	Tainan, Taiwan	1st	10,000 metres race walk	44:20.59
2022	2022 Tainan Half Marathon	Tainan, Taiwan	Male 33th	Half Marathon	1:35:14
2022	2022 National Intercollegiate Athletic Open	New Taipei City, Taiwan	1st	10,000 metres race walk	42:50.23
2022	2022 National University and College Athletic Games	Taoyuan, Taiwan	1st	10,000 metres race walk	43:17.78
2023	2023 National University and College Athletic Games	Taoyuan City, Taiwan	1st	10000 m race walk	41:45.90 NR
Representing Hsinchu
2017	2017 National Games	Yilan County, Taiwan	5th	20 km race walk	1:43:25
2018	66th New Year Race Walk	Tokyo, Japan	20th	10,000 metres race walk	46:47
2019	2019 National Games	Taoyuan, Taiwan	3rd	20,000 metres race walk	1:36:24
2020	2020 National Athletic Open	New Taipei City, Taiwan	1st	10,000 metres race walk	43:44.19
2021	2021 National Games	New Taipei City, Taiwan	1st	20,000 metres race walk	1:29:42
Representing ATH Biomedical
2022	2022 Taipei Master Athletics Open	Taipei, Taiwan	1st	5000 metres race walk	20:48.40
Individual
2021	2021 Taipei Marathon	Taipei, Taiwan	Male 399th	Half marathon	1:36:56
2023	71st New Year Race Walk, Tokyo	Tokyo, Japan	10th	20km race walk	1:26:47 NR
