= 2000 Asian Athletics Championships – Men's 5000 metres =

The men's 5000 metres event at the 2000 Asian Athletics Championships was held in Jakarta, Indonesia on 31 August.

== Results ==
Rank	Name	Nationality	Time	Notes
1st place, gold medalist(s)	Ahmed Ibrahim Warsama	Qatar	13:53.10	
2nd place, silver medalist(s)	Gong Ke	China	14:04.61	
3rd place, bronze medalist(s)	Mohamed Suleiman	Qatar	14:10.79	
4	Wu Wen-Chien	Chinese Taipei	14:12.26	
5	Jaafar Babakhani	Iran	14:18.51	
6	Abdullah Essam Abdin	Bahrain	14:18.93	
7	Gulab Chand	India	14:25.69	
8	Gojen Singh	India	14:27.77	
9	Michitane Noda	Japan	14:28.22	
10	Eduardo Buenavista	Philippines	14:34.53	
11	Rajendra Bahadur Bhandari	Nepal	14:48.72	
12	Cho Keun-Hyung	South Korea	14:53.43	
13	Gede Karang Asem	Indonesia	14:54.69	
14	Muhamad Abu Jamus	Palestine	14:59.80	
15	Ahmed Said Al-Rawahi	Oman	15:00.52	
16	Nader Abed Allah	Palestine	15:46.30	
17	Mok Bun Thoeun	Cambodia	17:07.16	
18	Han Samnang	Cambodia	17:58.26	
