= Athletics at the 2002 Asian Games – Men's 5000 metres =

Men's 5000 metres at the 2002 Asian Games
- Venue: Busan Asiad Main Stadium
- Dates: 10 October 2002
- Competitors: 14 from 11 nations

Medalists
gold medal	Mukhlid Al-Otaibi	Saudi Arabia
silver medal	Abdelhak Zakaria	Bahrain
bronze medal	Khamis Abdullah Saifeldin	Qatar

The men's 5000 metres competition at the 2002 Asian Games in Busan, South Korea was held on 10 October at the Busan Asiad Main Stadium.

== Schedule ==
All times are Korea Standard Time (UTC+09:00)

Date	Time	Event
Thursday, 10 October 2002	14:30	Final

== Records ==
Prior to this competition, the existing world, Asian and Games records were as follows.

World Record	Haile Gebrselassie (ETH)	12:39.36	Helsinki, Finland	13 June 1998
Asian Record	Toshinari Takaoka (JPN)	13:13.40	Hechtel-Eksel, Belgium	1 August 1998
Games Record	Toshinari Takaoka (JPN)	13:38.37	Hiroshima, Japan	16 October 1994

== Results ==
Legend

- DNF — Did not finish

Rank	Athlete	Time	Notes
1st place, gold medalist(s)	Mukhlid Al-Otaibi (KSA)	13:41.48	
2nd place, silver medalist(s)	Abdelhak Zakaria (BRN)	13:43.82	
3rd place, bronze medalist(s)	Khamis Abdullah Saifeldin (QAT)	13:44.42	
4	Toshihiro Iwasa (JPN)	13:48.24	
5	Dou Zhaobo (CHN)	13:51.34	
6	Wu Wen-chien (TPE)	13:54.42	
7	Ji Young-jun (KOR)	13:56.00	
8	Tomohiro Seto (JPN)	13:58.33	
9	Eduardo Buenavista (PHI)	13:58.43	
10	Cho Keun-hyung (KOR)	14:12.61	
11	Rajendra Bahadur Bhandari (NEP)	14:34.50	
12	Esam Salah Juaim (YEM)	14:59.57	
13	Nader Al-Masri (PLE)	15:05.97	
—	Nasir Ahmed Taib (QAT)	DNF	
