= 2002 Asian Athletics Championships – Men's 10,000 metres =

The men's 10,000 metres event at the 2002 Asian Athletics Championships was held in Colombo, Sri Lanka on 9 August.

== Results ==
Rank	Name	Nationality	Time	Notes
1st place, gold medalist(s)	Ahmed Ibrahim Warsama	Qatar	30:19.62	
2nd place, silver medalist(s)	Aman Majid Awadh	Qatar	30:21.65	
3rd place, bronze medalist(s)	Jagan Nath Lakade	India	30:39.44	PB
4	Anuradha Indrajith Cooray	Sri Lanka	31:03.17	
5	Ajith Bandara	Sri Lanka	31:06.74	SB
6	Ajith Bandara	Sri Lanka	31:22.57	
7	Alian Baliester	Philippines	32:13.86	PB
8	Aung Thi Ha	Myanmar	32:20.77	SB
9	Mohamed Said Salama	Palestine	32:29.09	PB
	Abdelhak Zakaria	Bahrain	DNF	
	Gojen Singh	India	DNF	
	Mehdi Zarenezhad	Iran	DNF	
	Ali Siati	Jordan	DNF	
	Roy Vence	Philippines	DNF	
	Djamched Rasulov	Tajikistan	DNF	
