= Abubaker Ali Kamal =

Qatari runner (born 1983)

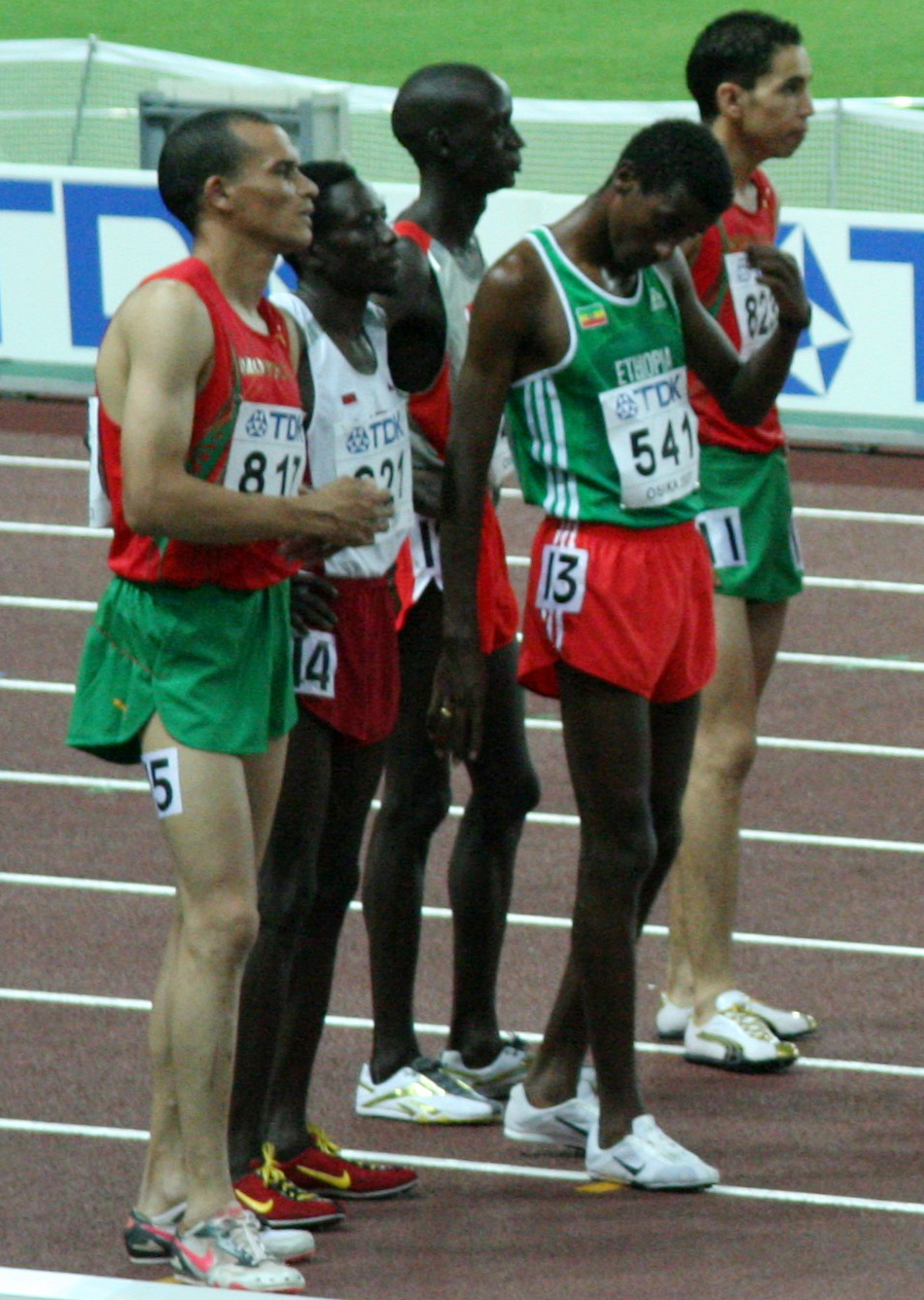
- Abubaker Ali Kamal (second from left) at the 2007 World Championships

Medal record

Men's athletics

Representing Qatar

Asian Games
Gold medal – first place	2014 Incheon	3000 m st.
Silver medal – second place	2002 Busan	3000 m st.

Asian Championships
Gold medal – first place	2005 Incheon	1500 m
Silver medal – second place	2000 Jakarta	1500 m
Bronze medal – third place	2002 Colombo	3000 m st.
Bronze medal – third place	2007 Amman	800 m
Bronze medal – third place	2007 Amman	1500 m
Bronze medal – third place	2009 Guangzhou	3000 m st.

Asian Indoor Championships
Silver medal – second place	2014 Hangzhou	3000 m
Bronze medal – third place	2008 Doha	1500 m

West Asian Games
Silver medal – second place	2005 Doha	1500 m

Pan Arab Games
Bronze medal – third place	2007 Cairo	3000 m st.

Abubaker Ali Kamal (born 8 November 1983) is a Qatari runner who has specialized mostly in the 1500 metres and 3000 metres steeplechase.

He won a 5000 m/steeplechase double at the 2011 Pan Arab Games, but failed a drugs test at the competition. He was disqualified and banned for two years for being positive for Erythropoietin (EPO).

== Achievements ==
Year	Competition	Venue	Position	Event	Notes
Representing Qatar
1999	World Youth Championships	Bydgoszcz, Poland	4th	1500 m	3:45.72
2000	World Junior Championships	Santiago, Chile	7th	1500 m	3:44.12
2000	Asian Championships	Jakarta, Indonesia	2nd	1500 m	3:52.64
2002	World Junior Championships	Kingston, Jamaica	3rd	3000 m s'chase	8:33.67 (NJR)
2002	Asian Games	Busan, South Korea	2nd	3000 m s'chase	8:31.75
2002	Asian Championships	Colombo, Sri Lanka	3rd	3000 m s'chase	8:37.4
2005	Asian Indoor Games	Bangkok, Thailand	2nd	1500 m	3:50.31
2005	Asian Indoor Games	Bangkok, Thailand	3rd	3000 m	8:13.24
2005	Asian Championships	Incheon, South Korea	1st	1500 m	3:44.24
2005	West Asian Games	Doha, Qatar	2nd	1500 m	3:41.45
2006	Asian Games	Doha, Qatar	4th	1500 m	3:41.09
2007	Asian Indoor Games	Macau, China	3rd	1500 m	3:50.78
2007	Asian Indoor Games	Macau, China	5th	3000 m	8:13.59
2007	Asian Championships	Amman, Jordan	3rd	800 m	1:52.22
2007	Asian Championships	Amman, Jordan	3rd	1500 m	3:47.22
2007	World Championships	Osaka, Japan	11th	3000 m s'chase	8:26.90
2007	Pan Arab Games	Cairo, Egypt	6th	1500 m	3:53.56
2007	Pan Arab Games	Cairo, Egypt	3rd	3000 m s'chase	8:43.02
2008	Asian Indoor Championships	Doha, Qatar	5th	800 m	1:49.86
2008	Asian Indoor Championships	Doha, Qatar	3rd	1500 m	3:42.50
2008	World Indoor Championships	Valencia, Spain	20th (h)	1500 m	3:45.95
2008	Olympic Games	Beijing, China	8th	3000 m s'chase	8:16.59
2009	Asian Indoor Games	Hanoi, Vietnam	3rd	1500 m	3:44.07
2009	Asian Championships	Guangzhou, China	15th (h)	1500 m	3:52.25
2009	Asian Championships	Guangzhou, China	3rd	3000 m s'chase	8:34.73
2009	World Championships	Daegu, South Korea	12th	3000 m s'chase	8:19.72
2010	2010 Asian Indoor Athletics Championships	Tehran, Iran	1st	1500 m	3:51.78
2010	World Indoor Championships	Doha, Qatar	21st (h)	1500 m	3:46.51
2011	Asian Championships	Kobe, Japan	1st	3000 m s'chase	8:30.23
2011	World Championships	Daegu, South Korea	20th (h)	3000 m s'chase	8:30.37
2011	Pan Arab Games	Doha, Qatar	–	5000 m	DQ
2011	Pan Arab Games	Doha, Qatar	–	3000 m s'chase	DQ
2014	Asian Games	Incheon, South Korea	1st	3000 m s'chase	8:28.72

== Personal bests ==
Outdoor

- 800 metres – 1:46.38 min (2006)
- 1500 metres – 3:36.15 min (2010)
- 3000 metres – 7:55.95 min (2006)
- 3000 metres steeplechase – 8:15.80 min (2008)
- 5000 metres – 13:25.51 min (2014)

Indoor

- 800 metres – 1:49.21 min (2009)
- 1500 metres – 3:41.69 min (2009)

== See also ==
- List of doping cases in athletics
