= Athletics at the 2009 Summer Universiade – Men's 5000 metres =

The men's 5000 metres event at the 2009 Summer Universiade was held on 10–12 July.

== Medalists ==
Gold	Silver	Bronze
Halil Akkaş; Turkey	Bayron Piedra; Ecuador	Elroy Gelant; South Africa

== Results ==
=== Heats ===
Qualification: First 5 of each heat (Q) and the next 5 fastest (q) qualified for the final.

Rank	Heat	Name	Nationality	Time	Notes
1	2	Mirko Petrović	Serbia	13:54.77	Q
2	2	Moorosi Soke	South Africa	13:55.62	Q
3	2	Diego Borrego	Mexico	13:55.85	Q
4	2	Tiidrek Nurme	Estonia	13:57.05	Q
5	2	Javier Guerra	Spain	13:57.27	Q
6	1	Halil Akkaş	Turkey	13:58.65	Q
7	1	Artem Kossinov	Kazakhstan	13:58.78	Q, SB
8	1	Bayron Piedra	Ecuador	13:59.26	Q
9	1	Elroy Gelant	South Africa	13:59.35	Q, PB
10	1	Ahmed Tamri	Morocco	13:59.49	Q, PB
11	1	Konstantin Vasilyev	Russia	13:59.58	q, SB
12	2	Tsuyoshi Ugachi	Japan	14:00.22	q
13	2	Liam Adams	Australia	14:01.42	q
14	2	Kemal Koyuncu	Turkey	14:04.50	q, SB
15	1	Joseph Chebet	Uganda	14:04.99	q
16	1	Akinobu Murasawa	Japan	14:08.31	
17	1	Michael Schmid	Austria	14:09.67	
18	2	Ren Longyun	China	14:17.97	
19	2	Ajmal Amirov	Tajikistan	14:20.99	PB
20	1	Liu Chao	China	14:26.19	
21	2	Luca Leone	Italy	14:41.00	
22	1	Isaiah Msibi	Swaziland	14:49.60	PB
23	1	Velimir Bojović	Serbia	14:57.77	
24	2	Wajid Ali	Pakistan	16:18.38	
	2	Lhoussein Boumezgour	Morocco	DNF	
	1	Faraj Entaifa	Libya	DNS	
	1	Samir Khadar	Algeria	DNS	
	1	Mainza Makunga	Zambia	DNS	
	2	Mohamed El-Zaydi	Libya	DNS	
	2	Manuel Manuelian	Lebanon	DNS	

=== Final ===
Rank	Name	Nationality	Time	Notes
1st place, gold medalist(s)	Halil Akkaş	Turkey	14:06.96	
2nd place, silver medalist(s)	Bayron Piedra	Ecuador	14:07.11	
3rd place, bronze medalist(s)	Elroy Gelant	South Africa	14:07.97	
4	Mirko Petrović	Serbia	14:09.17	
5	Tiidrek Nurme	Estonia	14:09.29	
6	Ahmed Tamri	Morocco	14:09.48	
7	Javier Guerra	Spain	14:11.49	
8	Konstantin Vasilyev	Russia	14:12.27	
9	Moorosi Soke	South Africa	14:12.46	
10	Liam Adams	Australia	14:12.86	
11	Joseph Chebet	Uganda	14:16.50	
12	Artem Kossinov	Kazakhstan	14:21.24	
13	Tsuyoshi Ugachi	Japan	14:23.82	
14	Kemal Koyuncu	Turkey	14:25.61	
15	Diego Borrego	Mexico	14:40.51	
