= 2003 Asian Athletics Championships – Men's 10,000 metres =

The men's 10,000 metres event at the 2003 Asian Athletics Championships was held in Manila, Philippines on September 21.

== Results ==
Rank	Name	Nationality	Time	Notes
1st place, gold medalist(s)	Ahmad Hassan Abdullah	Qatar	28:45.64	
2nd place, silver medalist(s)	Abdelhak Zakaria	Bahrain	30:04.13	SB
3rd place, bronze medalist(s)	Eduardo Buenavista	Philippines	30:06.29	
4	Aung Thi Ha	Myanmar	30:57.90	
5	Lee Hong-Kuk	South Korea	31:15.19	
6	Allan Ballester	Philippines	31:22.21	PB
7	Julius Sermona	Philippines	32:09.04	
8	Srisung Boonthung	Thailand	32:15.16	
9	Aman Saini	India	32:47.73	
	Sifli Anak Ahar	Brunei	DNF	
	Ajmal Amirov	Tajikistan	DNF	
	Saud Al-Thubaiti	Saudi Arabia	DNS	
	Mohamed Said Salama	Palestine	DNS	
	Nader Al-Massri	Palestine	DNS	
