= Lin Xiangqian =

Chinese long-distance runner

Medal record

Men's athletics

Representing China

Asian Championships
Silver medal – second place	2009 Guangzhou	3000 m st.

Lin Xiangqian (Chinese: 林向前, born 27 January 1987 in Jiangsu province) is a Chinese long-distance runner from Suzhou, Jiangsu province who specializes in the 3000 metres steeplechase.

He finished fifth at the 2006 World Junior Championships, won the bronze medal at the 2006 Asian Games and the silver medal at the 2009 Asian Championships. He won the 5000 metres event at the 11th National Chinese Games in 2009.

His personal best time is 8:27.14 minutes, achieved in October 2009 in Jinan. He also has 3:46.35 minutes in the 1500 metres, achieved in September 2003 in Shanghai; 8:11.28 minutes in the 3000 metres, achieved in April 2004 in Yichun; 13:46.42 minutes in the 5000 metres, achieved in April 2005 in Zhongshan; and 29:46.83 minutes in the 10,000 metres, achieved in May 2006 in Zhengzhou.
