= 2003 Asian Athletics Championships – Men's 3000 metres steeplechase =

The men's 3000 metres steeplechase event at the 2003 Asian Athletics Championships was held in Manila, Philippines on September 21.

== Results ==
Rank	Name	Nationality	Time	Notes
1st place, gold medalist(s)	Khamis Abdullah Saifeldin	Qatar	8:51.60	
2nd place, silver medalist(s)	Wu Wen-Chien	Chinese Taipei	8:55.38	
3rd place, bronze medalist(s)	Yasunori Uchitomi	Japan	8:56.31	
4	Rene Herrera	Philippines	9:00.69	
5	Shantha Mendis	Sri Lanka	9:01.55	
6	Arun D'Souza	India	9:02.24	
7	Abolfazi Mahmoudian	Iran	9:05.16	
8	Jirasak Sutthichart	Thailand	9:23.01	
