= 2009 Asian Athletics Championships – Men's 3000 metres steeplechase =

The men's 3000 metres steeplechase event at the 2009 Asian Athletics Championships was held at the Guangdong Olympic Stadium on November 12.

== Results ==
Rank	Name	Nationality	Time	Notes
1st place, gold medalist(s)	Tareq Mubarak Taher	Bahrain	8:33.58	
2nd place, silver medalist(s)	Lin Xiangqian	China	8:34.13	SB
3rd place, bronze medalist(s)	Abubaker Ali Kamal	Qatar	8:34.73	
4	Elam Singh	India	8:41.81	PB
5	Tsuyoshi Takeda	Japan	8:41.89	
6	Takayuki Matsuura	Japan	8:44.00	
7	Yang Le	China	8:50.58	
8	Jaibir Singh	India	8:52.16	
9	Ho Chin-ping	Chinese Taipei	9:06.06	
10	Ahmad Foroud	Iran	9:06.09	
11	Rene Herrera	Philippines	9:07.91	
12	Omar Al-Rasheedi	Kuwait	9:21.80	
