= 2000 Asian Athletics Championships – Men's 10,000 metres =

The men's 10,000 metres event at the 2000 Asian Athletics Championships was held in Jakarta, Indonesia on 28 August.

== Results ==
Rank	Name	Nationality	Time	Notes
1st place, gold medalist(s)	Ahmed Ibrahim Warsama	Qatar	29:53.00	
2nd place, silver medalist(s)	Gulab Chand	India	30:03.75	
3rd place, bronze medalist(s)	Gong Ke	China	30:05.11	
4	Jaafar Babakhani	Iran	30:10.77	
5	Anuradha Indrajith Cooray	Sri Lanka	30:17.22	
6	Abdullah Essam Abdin	Bahrain	30:29.24	
7	Cho Keun-Hyung	South Korea	30:40.18	
8	Gojen Singh	India	30:54.77	
9	Sergey Zabavskiy	Tajikistan	31:17.51	
10	Ferry Junaedi	Indonesia	31:50.24	
11	Nasser Al-Bishi	Saudi Arabia	31:56.73	
12	Ibrahim Khamis	Oman	32:55.42	
13	Muhamad Abdel Ghani	Oman	33:34.78	
14	Mok Bun Thoeun	Cambodia	39:46.82	
	Mukhlid Al-Otaibi	Saudi Arabia	DNF	
