= 2005 Asian Athletics Championships – Men's 10,000 metres =

The men's 10,000 metres event at the 2005 Asian Athletics Championships was held in Incheon, South Korea on September 2.

== Results ==
Rank	Name	Nationality	Time	Notes
1st place, gold medalist(s)	Essa Ismail Rashed	Qatar	29:03.60	NJR
2nd place, silver medalist(s)	Mukhlid Al-Otaibi	Saudi Arabia	29:04.85	
3rd place, bronze medalist(s)	Ali Saadoun Al-Dawoodi	Qatar	29:05.93	SB
4	Yoshinori Oda	Japan	29:47.75	
5	Kazuo Ietani	Japan	29:50.17	
6	Lee Myong-Seun	South Korea	30:25.03	
7	Kuldeep Kumar	India	31:18.75	
8	Sotyvoldy Khaitov	Tajikistan	32:28.74	PB
