= Musa Amer Obaid =

Qatari-Kenyan middle distance runner (born 1985)

Medal record

Men's athletics

Representing Qatar

Asian Championships
Gold medal – first place	2005 Incheon	3000 m st.

Musa Amer Obaid (Arabic: موسى عامر عبيد; born April 18, 1985, in Kenya) is a middle distance runner mainly competing in steeplechase. He was born Moses Kipkirui, but represents Qatar after changing nationality from his birth country Kenya.

Musa Amer finished fourth in the 3000 metres steeplechase at the 2004 Summer Olympics in a personal best time of 8:07.18 minutes, having won the silver medal at the World Junior Championships a month earlier. In 2005 he finished ninth at the World Championships and seventh at the World Athletics Final.

In 2006 Musa Amer was found guilty of testosterone doping. The sample was delivered on 14 June 2006 in an IAAF out-of-competition test in Ifrane, Morocco. He received an IAAF suspension from September 2006 to September 2008.

== See also ==
- List of doping cases in athletics
