= Kazuo Ietani =

Japanese long-distance runner

Kazuo Ietani (家谷和男, Ietani Kazuo; born 25 August 1977) is a Japanese long-distance runner who specializes in the half marathon.

He finished eighth at the 2005 World Half Marathon Championships, which was good enough to help Japan finish third in the team competition.

His personal best time is 1:02:18 hours, achieved in March 2007 in Yamaguchi. In the 10,000 metres his personal best time is 28:34.04 minutes, achieved in April 2007 in Kobe.

== Achievements ==
Year	Competition	Venue	Position	Event	Notes
Representing Japan
2001	East Asian Games	Osaka, Japan	1st	Half Marathon	1:04:49
2005	Asian Championships	Incheon, South Korea	5th	10,000 m	29:50.17
2005	World Half Marathon Championships	Edmonton, Canada	8th	Half Marathon	1:02:26
