= 2002 Asian Athletics Championships – Men's 3000 metres steeplechase =

The men's 3000 metres steeplechase event at the 2002 Asian Athletics Championships was held in Colombo, Sri Lanka on 10 August.

== Results ==
Rank	Name	Nationality	Time	Notes
1st place, gold medalist(s)	Khamis Abdullah Saifeldin	Qatar	8:16.0	
2nd place, silver medalist(s)	Saad Al-Asmari	Saudi Arabia	8:16.7	
3rd place, bronze medalist(s)	Abubaker Ali Kamal	Qatar	8:37.4	
4	Hassan Ali Al-Asmari	Saudi Arabia	8:48.1	
5	Wu Wen-Chien	Chinese Taipei	8:52.8	
6	Arun D'Souza	India	8:58.9	
7	Jaafar Babakhani	Iran	8:59.4	SB
8	Shantha Mendis	Sri Lanka	9:07.8	
9	Ranjan Kumar Jha	India	9:10.5	
10	Upendra Indika Bandara	Sri Lanka	9:30.4	SB
11	A.V.P. Hangarapitiya	Sri Lanka	9:30.4	SB
12	Tatsuya Murayama	Japan	9:33.9	
	Mehdi Zamani	Iran	DNF	
	Park Sang-Moon	South Korea	DNF	
