= Artem Kossinov =

Kazakhstani runner

Personal information
- Born: 31 July 1986 (age 39)

Sport
- Country: Kazakhstan
- Sport: Athletics

Artem Kosinov (born 31 July 1986 in Taldykorgan) is a Kazakhstani runner. He competed in the 3000 m steeplechase event at the 2012 Summer Olympics.

== Competition record ==
Year	Competition	Venue	Position	Event	Notes
Representing Kazakhstan
2006	World Cross Country Championships	Fukuoka, Japan	107th	Short race	
2009	Universiade	Belgrade, Serbia	9th	1500 m	3:45.32
2009	Universiade	Belgrade, Serbia	12th	5000 m	14:21.24
2010	Asian Games	Guangzhou, China	8th	1500 m	3:44.77
2011	Asian Championships	Kobe, Japan	2nd	3000 m s'chase	8:35.11
2012	Olympic Games	London, United Kingdom	24th (h)	3000 m s'chase	8:42.27
2013	Universiade	Kazan, Russia	16th (h)	3000 m s'chase	9:16.92
