= Hassan Mourhit =

Moroccan-Belgian long-distance runner

Hassan Mourhit (born 2 January 1982) is a Moroccan-Belgian long-distance runner.

He is the brother of another Moroccan-Belgian runner, Mohammed Mourhit. He changed nationality from Morocco to Belgium on 15 August 2003. Two weeks later he competed at the 5000 metres event at the 2003 World Championships, where he did not progress from his heat.

His personal best time was 13:21.97 minutes, achieved on 2 August 2003 in Heusden-Zolder. He also had 3:37.47 minutes in the 1500 metres, achieved in July 2007 in the same city, and 7:55.81 in the 3000 metres, achieved on the indoor track in February 2001 in Ghent. During that same meeting, he achieved the fastest time ever ran by a junior (= under 20) over two miles indoor, which is still a Moroccan record today.
