= Athletics at the 2005 East Asian Games =

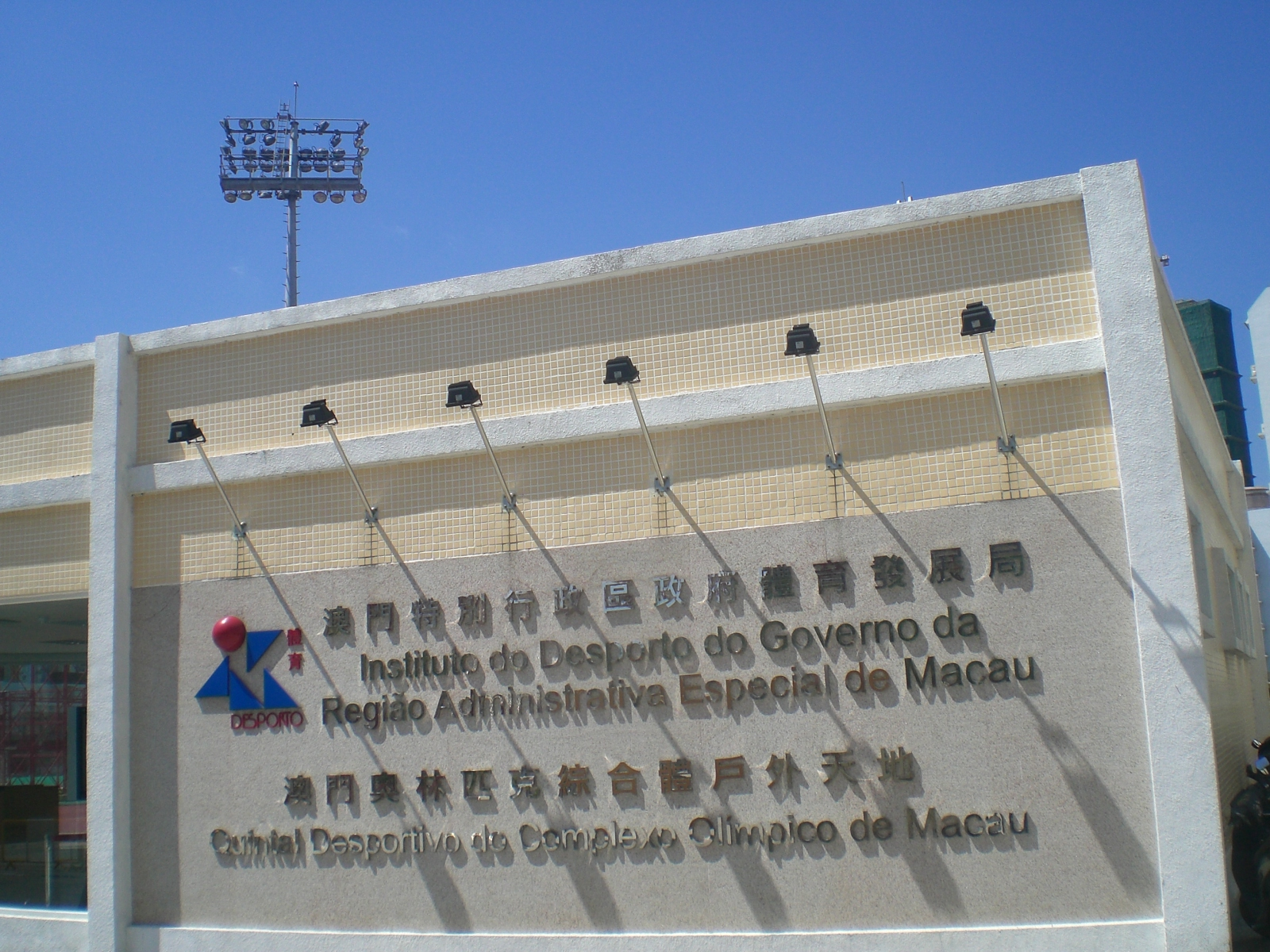
- The Estádio Campo Desportivo in Macau
- Dates: 1 – 4 November
- Host city: Macau, PR China
- Venue: Estádio Campo Desportivo
- Level: Senior
- Events: 45
- Participation: ? athletes from 9 nations
- Records set: 11 Games records

At the 2005 East Asian Games, the athletics events were held at the Estádio Campo Desportivo in Macau, People's Republic of China from 1–4 November. A total of 45 events were contested, of which 23 by male and 22 by female athletes. China easily topped the medal table, winning 26 of the 45 available gold medals and accounting for half of the total female medallists. Japan won 46 medals, 16 of them gold, while South Korea was a clear third with a total of 21 medals. No athletes from either Guam or Mongolia reached the podium.

During the four-day competition, a total of 11 East Asian Games records were broken. Among these were Liu Xiang's 13.21 seconds run in the 110 metres hurdles and a 20.06 m throw in the shot put from Zhang Qi (who had set a Chinese record some weeks earlier). The 2000 Olympic Champion Wang Liping brought her career to a close with a final gold in the 20 km race walk.

A total of six athletes medalled in multiple individual events: Yuki Nakamura won both the men's 5000 and 10,000 metres events, while Hiromi Ominami won two silvers on the women's side. Lee Duhaeng took 10,000 m silver and 5000 m bronze, Bae Hae-Jin did a bronze double in the 1500/5000 m, and Chen Fu-Pin won the 800 metres silver and 1500 m bronze. In the field events, Yuka Murofushi won bronze in both the discus and hammer throws.

While the large majority of events featured performances of an international standard, some competitions fell far short of the level expected of a regional games event. Many of Japan's top athletes were absent and a number of Chinese competitors had peaked earlier at the 10th Chinese National Games in Nanjing. Only one athlete (Takuro Mori) managed to clear the bar in the whole of the men's pole vault contest, while Hou Fei took bronze in the men's hammer with a small throw of 37.14 (almost half that of the winner). In the women's 4×400 metres relay Macau's bronze medal time of 4:05.61 was over thirty seconds slower than the winning team, and some 50 seconds off the world record time. Furthermore, the distances races were criticised for their slow pacing, the men's 10,000 bronze medalist running slightly slower than the women's bronze medalist.

== Records ==
Name	Event	Country	Record	Type
Liu Qing	800 metres	China	2:00.11	GR
Hiroyuki Morikawa	1500 metres	Japan	3:48.27	GR
Feng Yun	100 metres hurdles	China	13.09	GR
Liu Xiang	110 metres hurdles	China	13.21	GR
Huang Xiaoxiao	400 metres hurdles	China	55.33	GR
Yu Chaohong	20 km walk	China	1:23:51	GR
Zhao Yingying	Pole vault	China	4.40	GR
Kim Duk-Hyung	Triple jump	South Korea	16.79	GR
Zhang Qi	Shot put	China	20.06	GR
Song Aimin	Discus throw	China	64.32	GR
Zhang Wenxiu	Hammer throw	China	72.23	GR
Ma Ning	Javelin throw	China	61.95	GR

Key:	WR — World record • AR — Area record • GR — Games record • NR — National record

== Medal summary ==
=== Men ===
Event	Gold		Silver		Bronze	
100 metres	Hu Kai (CHN)	10.40	Shingo Kawabata (JPN)	10.54	Wang Shih-Wen (TPE)	10.63
200 metres	Shinji Takahira (JPN)	20.88	Yang Yaozu (CHN)	21.34	Suh Min-Suk (KOR)	21.42
400 metres	Yoshihiro Horigome (JPN)	46.44	Yosuke Inoue (JPN)	47.41	Chao Un Kei (MAC)	49.43
800 metres	Lee Jae-Hun (KOR)	1:48.60	Chen Fu-Pin (TPE)	1:49.74	Masaharu Nakano (JPN)	1:50.10
1500 metres	Hiroyuki Morikawa (JPN)	3:48.27 GR	Yasuhiro Tago (JPN)	3:50.82	Chen Fu-Pin (TPE)	3:52.63
5000 metres	Yuki Nakamura (JPN)	14:05.77	Tomohiro Seto (JPN)	14:16.44	Lee Duhaeng (KOR)	14:24.03
10,000 metres	Yuki Nakamura (JPN)	31:59.69	Lee Duhaeng (KOR)	31:59.72	Iao Kuanun (MAC)	34:55.56
110 metre hurdles	Liu Xiang (CHN)	13.21 GR	Shi Dongpeng (CHN)	13.36	Kota Kumamoto (JPN)	13.89
400 metre hurdles	Takayuki Koike (JPN)	50.85	Zhang Shibao (CHN)	51.04	Susumu Saito (JPN)	52.08
3000 metre steeplechase	Yoshitaka Iwamizu (JPN)	8:40.16	Yasunori Uchitomi (JPN)	8:45.47	Wu Wen-Chien (TPE)	8:50.41
4×100 metre relay	Japan (JPN)	39.61	Chinese Taipei (TPE)	39.89	China (CHN)	39.90
4×400 metre relay	Japan (JPN)	3:07.70	Chinese Taipei (TPE)	3:09.06	South Korea (KOR)	3:12.10
Half marathon	Toshinari Fujimoto (JPN)	1:08:14	Huh Jang-Kyu (KOR)	1:08:17	Eom Hyo-Seok (KOR)	1:08:38
20 km walk	Yu Chaohong (CHN)	1:23:51 GR	Shin Il-Yong (KOR)	1:24:44	Takayuki Tanii (JPN)	1:25:51
High jump	Huang Haiqiang (CHN)	2.23	Naoyuki Daigo (JPN)	2.23	Zhang Shufeng (CHN)	2.20
Pole vault	Takuro Mori (JPN)	5.00	Not awarded	—	Not awarded	—
Long jump	Song Jian (CHN)	7.77 w	Kenji Fujikawa (JPN)	7.73	Oh Sang-Won (KOR)	7.72
Triple jump	Kim Duk-Hyung (KOR)	16.79 GR	Yohei Kajikawa (JPN)	16.45	Zhu Shujing (CHN)	16.38
Shot put	Zhang Qi (CHN)	20.06 GR	Jia Peng (CHN)	18.84	Shon Hyun (KOR)	18.06
Discus throw	Wu Tao (CHN)	61.74	Tulake Nuermaimaiti (CHN)	59.27	Choi Jong-Bun (KOR)	54.19
Hammer throw	Hiroaki Doi (JPN)	70.35	Lee Yoon-Chul (KOR)	66.40	Hou Fei (MAC)	37.14
Javelin throw	Li Rongxiang (CHN)	79.75	Chen Qi (CHN)	76.96	Chu Ki-Young (KOR)	75.59
Decathlon	Kim Kun-Woo (KOR)	7754	Yu Bin (CHN)	7531	Hsaio Szu-Pin (TPE)	7383

=== Women ===
Event	Gold		Silver		Bronze	
100 metres	Qin Wangping (CHN)	11.65	Shu Yan (CHN)	11.76	Ayumi Suzuki (JPN)	11.95
200 metres	Chen Lisha (CHN)	23.78	Rina Fujimaki (JPN)	24.58	Wan Kin Yee (HKG)	24.70
400 metres	Asami Tanno (JPN)	52.69	Tang Xiaoyin (CHN)	52.93	Xie Qing (CHN)	54.42
800 metres	Liu Qing (CHN)	2:00.11 GR	Yang Wei (CHN)	2:04.57	Ayako Jinnouchi (JPN)	2:05.45
1500 metres	Xie Sainan (CHN)	4:20.54	Kaori Kumasaka (JPN)	4:21.77	Bae Hae-Jin (KOR)	4:30.56
5000 metres	Xing Huina (CHN)	16:04.56	Hiromi Ominami (JPN)	16:10.77	Bae Hae-Jin (KOR)	16:35.35
10,000 metres	Bao Guiying (CHN)	32:35.07	Hiromi Ominami (JPN)	32:36.62	Paek Hyang-Ok (PRK)	34:53.06
100 metre hurdles	Feng Yun (CHN)	13.09 GR	Su Yiping (CHN)	13.44	Kumiko Ikeda (JPN)	13.45
400 metre hurdles	Huang Xiaoxiao (CHN)	55.33 GR	Wang Xing (CHN)	56.54	Satomi Kubokura (JPN)	57.38
4×100 metre relay	Japan (JPN)	44.88	China (CHN)	45.37	Hong Kong (HKG)	46.66
4×400 metre relay	China (CHN)	3:33.59	Japan (JPN)	3:36.64	Macau (MAC)	4:05.61 (NR)
Half marathon	Yoshiko Ichikawa (JPN)	1:16:31	Lim Kyung-Hee (KOR)	1:16:33	Jong Yong-Ok (PRK)	1:18:48
20 km walk	Wang Liping (CHN)	1:34:01	Kim Mi-Jung (KOR)	1:34:31	Sachiko Konishi (JPN)	1:35:10
High jump	Jing Xuezhu (CHN)	1.85	Zheng Xingjuan (CHN)	1.85	Mai Yonezu (JPN)	1.70
Pole vault	Zhao Yingying (CHN)	4.40 GR	Gao Shuying (CHN)	4.30	Ikuko Nishikori (JPN)	4.30
Long jump	Kumiko Ikeda (JPN)	6.54	Jung Soon-Ok (KOR)	6.31	Zhang Yuan (CHN)	6.12
Triple jump	Huang Qiuyan (CHN)	14.08	Xie Limei (CHN)	13.65	Kim Su-Yeon (KOR)	13.36
Shot put	Li Meiju (CHN)	18.12	Yoko Toyonaga (JPN)	16.89	Liu Yingpan (CHN)	16.50
Discus throw	Song Aimin (CHN)	64.32 GR	Ma Shuli (CHN)	60.13	Yuka Murofushi (JPN)	54.28
Hammer throw	Zhang Wenxiu (CHN)	72.23 GR	Liu Yinghui (CHN)	69.20	Yuka Murofushi (JPN)	63.67
Javelin throw	Ma Ning (CHN)	61.95 GR	Xue Juan (CHN)	61.42	Misa Nakano (JPN)	53.37
Heptathlon	Wang Hailan (CHN)	5932	Yuki Nakata (JPN)	5719	Chinami Yasuda (JPN)	5292

== Medal table ==
* Host nation (Macau)

Rank	Nation	Gold	Silver	Bronze	Total
1	China	26	19	6	51
2	Japan	16	15	15	46
3	South Korea	3	7	11	21
4	Chinese Taipei	0	3	4	7
5	Macau*	0	0	4	4
6	Hong Kong	0	0	2	2
6	North Korea	0	0	2	2
8	Guam	0	0	0	0
8	Mongolia	0	0	0	0
Totals (9 entries)		45	44	44	133
