= 2005 Asian Athletics Championships – Men's 3000 metres steeplechase =

The men's 3000 metres steeplechase event at the 2005 Asian Athletics Championships was held in Incheon, South Korea on September 2.

== Results ==
Rank	Name	Nationality	Time	Notes
1st place, gold medalist(s)	Musa Amer Obaid	Qatar	8:33.62	
2nd place, silver medalist(s)	Moustafa Ahmed Shebto	Qatar	8:40.86	
3rd place, bronze medalist(s)	Wu Wen-Chien	Chinese Taipei	8:42.96	SB
4	Yasunori Uchitomi	Japan	8:47.25	
5	Mohammed Faleh	Iraq	8:49.52	NR
6	Kim Young-Jin	South Korea	8:56.92	
7	Hiroyoshi Umegae	Japan	9:00.62	
8	Rene Herrera	Philippines	9:03.87	
9	Arun D'Souza	India	9:11.87	
10	Elias Dedeus	Timor-Leste	10:35.57	SB
