= Mukhlid Al-Otaibi =

Saudi Arabian long-distance runner

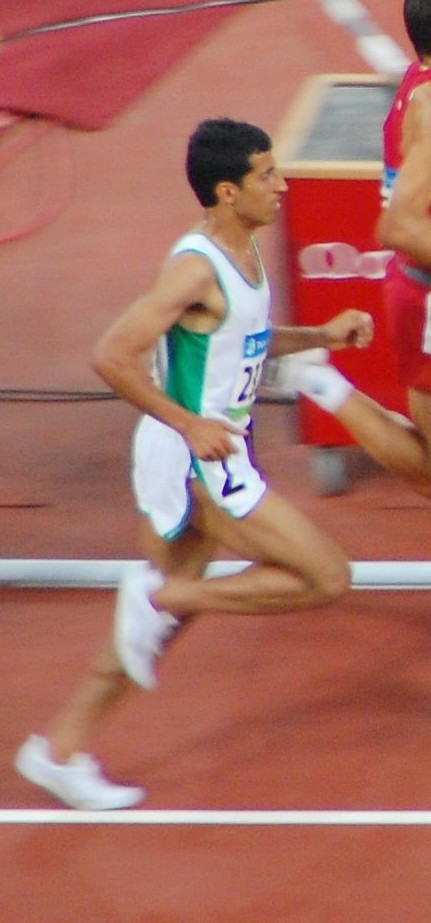
- Al-Otaibi at the 2008 Summer Olympics

Personal information
- Born: June 20, 1976 (age 50) Ta'if, Saudi Arabia

Sport
- Country: Saudi Arabia
- Sport: Track
- Events: 1500 metres, 5000 metres, 10,000 metres

Achievements and titles
- Personal bests: 1500 metres: 3:38.21; 5000 metres: 12:58.58; 10,000 metres: 27:31.61
Medal record
Men's athletics
Representing Saudi Arabia
Asian Games
| Gold medal – first place | 2002 Busan | 5000 m |
| Gold medal – first place | 2002 Busan | 10,000 m |
Asian Championships
| Silver medal – second place | 2005 Incheon | 10,000 m |
Islamic Solidarity Games
| Silver medal – second place | 2005 Mecca | 10,000 m |
Pan Arab Games
| Bronze medal – third place | 2007 Cairo | 10,000 m |
| Bronze medal – third place | 2011 Doha | 5000 m |
West Asian Games
| Silver medal – second place | 2002 Kuwait City | 10,000 m |
Asian Junior Championships
| Gold medal – first place | 1999 Singapore | 10,000 m |
| Silver medal – second place | 1999 Singapore | 5000 m |

Mukhlid Mahil Al-Otaibi (Arabic: مخلد ماهل العتيبي; born 20 June 1976), occasionally spelled as Moukhled Al Outaibi, is a Saudi Arabian long-distance runner who specializes in long-distance track and road running events. He represented his country at three Summer Olympics, in 2008, 2012, and 2016. He was the oldest member of Saudi Arabia's 2016 Olympic team.

== Running career ==
Al-Otaibi finished second overall in the 5000 metres at the 1999 Asian Junior Athletics Championships. He ran at his first Olympic competition when he raced in the men's 5000 metres at the 2008 Summer Olympics. At the 2012 Summer Olympics, he ran both the 5000 metres and the 10,000 metres. At the 2016 Summer Olympics, he ran in the men's 5000 metres. Following an in-competition doping test at the 2016 Summer Olympics, Al-Otaibi tested positive for a banned substance and was suspended for four years, rendering him ineligible to compete until 19 October 2020.

== Achievements ==
| Year | Competition | Venue | Position | Event | Notes |
Representing Saudi Arabia
| 1999 | Asian Junior Championships | Singapore | 2nd | 5000 m | 14:46.89 |
| 1999 | Asian Junior Championships | Singapore | 1st | 10,000 m | 30:11.05 |
| 2000 | Asian Championships | Jakarta, Indonesia | – | 10,000 m | DNF |
| 2002 | West Asian Games | Kuwait City, Kuwait | 2nd | 5000 m | 14:08.84 |
| 2002 | Asian Championships | Colombo, Sri Lanka | 4th | 5000 m | 14:21.36 |
| 2002 | Asian Games | Busan, South Korea | 1st | 5000 m | 13:41.48 |
| 2002 | Asian Games | Busan, South Korea | 1st | 10000 m | 28:41.89 |
| 2003 | World Championships | Paris, France | 14th | 5000 m | 13:38.92 |
| 2005 | Islamic Solidarity Games | Mecca, Saudi Arabia | 2nd | 10,000 m | 28:41.81 |
| 2005 | World Championships | Helsinki, Finland | 9th | 5000 m | 13:35.29 |
| 2005 | Asian Championships | Incheon, South Korea | 2nd | 10,000 m | 29:04.85 |
| 2006 | World Indoor Championships | Moscow, Russia | 8th | 3000 m | 7:52.91 |
| 2007 | Pan Arab Games | Cairo, Egypt | 3rd | 10,000 m | 29:29.74 |
| 2008 | Olympic Games | Beijing, China | 18th (h) | 5000 m | 13:47.00 |
| 2010 | Asian Games | Guangzhou, China | 4th | 5000 m | 28:22.13 |
| 2011 | Pan Arab Games | Doha, Qatar | 3rd | 5000 m | 13:46.62 |
| 2012 | Olympic Games | London, United Kingdom | 23rd (h) | 5000 m | 13:31.47 |
| 2012 | Olympic Games | London, United Kingdom | 17th | 10,000 m | 28:07.25 |
| 2016 | Olympic Games | Rio de Janeiro, Brazil | 41st (h) | 5000 m | 14:18.48 |

=== Personal bests ===
- 1500 metres - 3:38.12 min (2004)
- 3000 metres - 7:46.31 min (2004)
- 5000 metres - 12:58.58 min (2005)
- 10000 metres - 27.31.61 min (2012)
