= Yoshitaka Iwamizu =

Japanese long-distance runner

Personal information
- Born: 20 June 1979 (age 47) Toyohashi, Aichi, Japan

Sport
- Country: Japan
- Sport: Track and field
- Event: 3000 metres steeplechase
Medal record
Men's athletics
Representing Japan
Asian Games
Silver medal – second place	2002 Busan	3000 m steeplechase
East Asian Games
Gold medal – first place	2005 Macau	3000 m steeplechase

Yoshitaka Iwamizu (岩水 嘉孝, Iwamizu Yoshitaka; born 20 June 1979) is a Japanese long-distance runner. He competes in the 3000 metres steeplechase.

He finished fifth at the 2001 Summer Universiade in Beijing, won a silver medal at the 2002 Asian Games in Busan, Korea and finished eleventh at the 2003 World Championships in Paris. He also competed at the World Championships in 2001 and 2005 as well as the 2004 Summer Olympics without reaching the finals there.

He graduated from the Juntendo University.

== Personal bests ==
- 3000 m s'chase: 8:18.93 minutes (Japanese record), 23 August 2003, Saint-Denis, France
- 5000m: 13:37.99 minutes, 21 May 2005, Fukuroi, Japan
- 10,000m: 28:17.80 minutes, 24 September 2010, Niigata, Japan
