= Wu Wen-chien =

Taiwanese long-distance runner

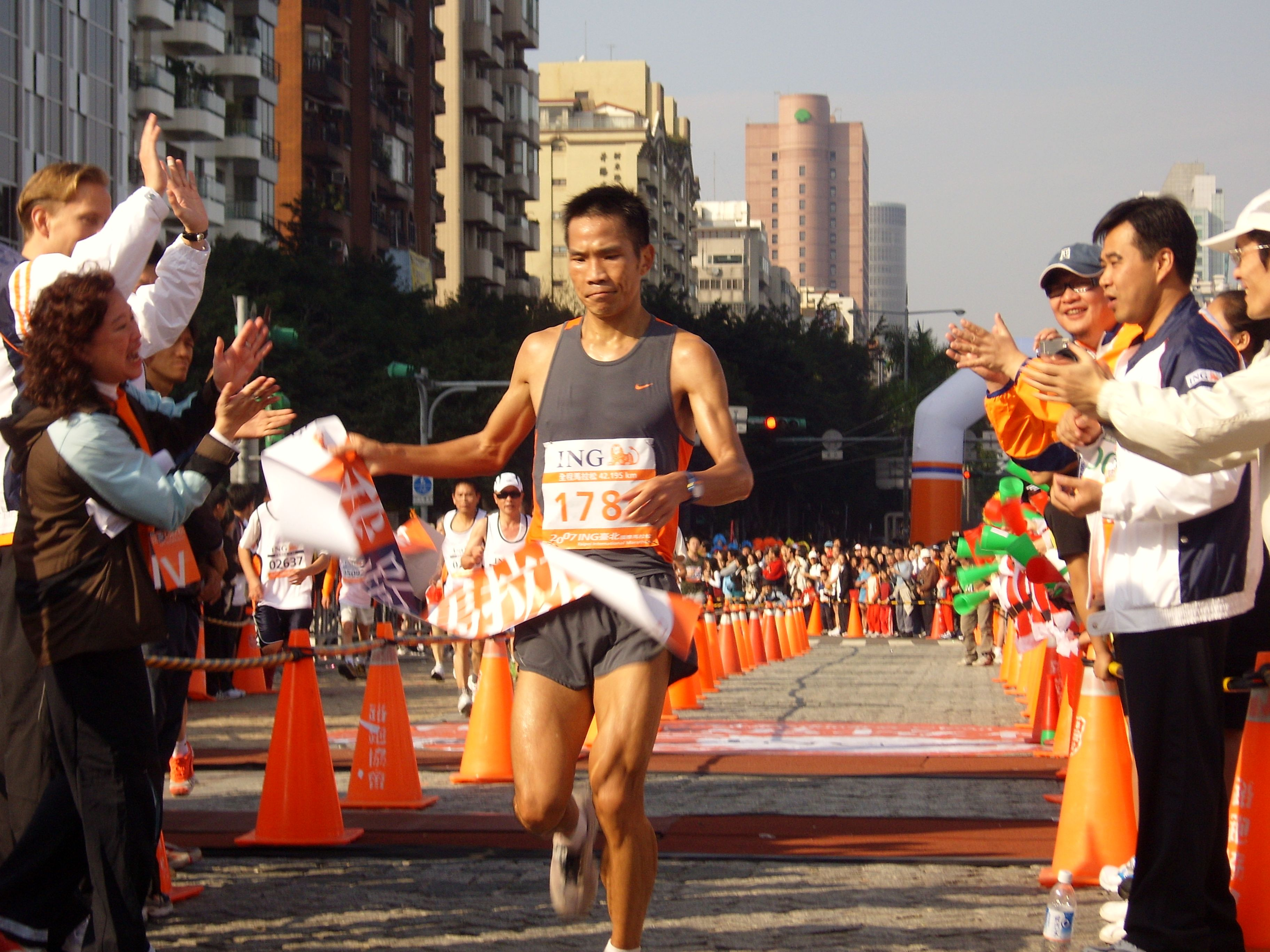
- Wu Wen-chien at 2007 Taipei Marathon

Personal information
- Born: June 9, 1977 (age 49)

Sport
- Sport: Marathon running
Medal record
Representing Chinese Taipei
Asian Championships
Silver medal – second place	2003 Manila	3000 m steeplechase
Bronze medal – third place	2005 Incheon	5000 m
Bronze medal – third place	2005 Incheon	3000 m steeplechase
Asian Indoor Championships
Silver medal – second place	2004 Tehran	3000 m
East Asian Games
Bronze medal – third place	2001 Osaka	3000 m steeplechase
Bronze medal – third place	2001 Osaka	5000 m
Bronze medal – third place	2005 Macau	3000 m steeplechase
Bronze medal – third place	2009 Singapore	3000 m steeplechase

Wu Wen-Chien (Chinese: 吳文騫; born June 9, 1977) is a Taiwanese Olympic long-distance runner that represented Chinese Taipei in the 2004 and 2008 Summer Olympics in the marathon.

== Competition record ==
Year	Competition	Venue	Position	Event	Notes
Representing Chinese Taipei
1997	Universiade	Catania, Italy	27th	Half marathon	1:13:14
2000	Asian Championships	Jakarta, Indonesia	4th	5000 m	14:12.26
2000	Asian Championships	Jakarta, Indonesia	6th	3000 m s'chase	8:56.74
2001	East Asian Games	Osaka, Japan	3rd	5000 m	14:15.50
2001	East Asian Games	Osaka, Japan	3rd	3000 m s'chase	8:44.15
2001	Universiade	Beijing, China	11th	Half marathon	1:07:24
2001	Universiade	Beijing, China	8th	3000 m s'chase	8:40.25
2002	Asian Championships	Colombo, Sri Lanka	5th	5000 m	14:25.16
2002	Asian Championships	Colombo, Sri Lanka	5th	3000 m s'chase	8:52.8
2002	Asian Games	Busan, South Korea	6th	5000 m	13:54.42
2002	Asian Games	Busan, South Korea	4th	3000 m s'chase	8:34.76
2003	World Indoor Championships	Birmingham, United Kingdom	19th (h)	3000 m	8:14.61
2003	Universiade	Daegu, South Korea	13th	Half marathon	1:07:04
2003	Asian Championships	Manila, Philippines	2nd	3000 m s'chase	8:55.38
2004	Asian Indoor Championships	Tehran, Iran	2nd	3000 m	8:24.39
2004	Olympic Games	Athens, Greece	56th	Marathon	2:23:54
2005	Asian Championships	Incheon, South Korea	3rd	5000 m	14:32.43
2005	Asian Championships	Incheon, South Korea	3rd	3000 m s'chase	8:42.96
2005	East Asian Games	Macau, China	3rd	3000 m s'chase	8:50.41
2006	Asian Games	Doha, Qatar	8th	3000 m s'chase	9:12.31
2008	Olympic Games	Beijing, China	59th	Marathon	2:26:55
2009	East Asian Games	Hong Kong, China	3rd	3000 m s'chase	9:04.48
2010	Asian Games	Guangzhou, China	10th	10,000 m	30:07.87
2010	Asian Games	Guangzhou, China	7th	3000 m s'chase	9:00.80
