= Ahmed Ibrahim Warsama =

Qatari long-distance runner

Ahmed Ibrahim
Personal information
- Native name: أحمد إبراهيم هاشم
- Full name: Ahmed Ibrahim Hashim
- Nationality: Qatari
- Born: 4 February 1966 (age 60)
- Height: 1.89 m (6 ft 2 in)
- Weight: 65 kg (143 lb)

Sport
- Country: Qatar
- Sport: Athletics
- Event: Long-distance running
Medal record
Men's athletics
Representing Qatar
Asian Championships
Gold medal – first place	1987 Singapore	5000 m
Gold medal – first place	2000 Jakarta	5000 m
Gold medal – first place	2000 Jakarta	10,000 m
Gold medal – first place	2002 Colombo	10,000 m
Silver medal – second place	1987 Singapore	10,000 m
Silver medal – second place	1991 Kuala Lumpur	5000 m
Bronze medal – third place	1993 Manila	1500 m
Bronze medal – third place	1995 Jakarta	10,000 m
Bronze medal – third place	1998 Fukuoka	5000 m

Ahmed Ibrahim Hashim (Arabic: أحمد ابراهيم هاشم; born 4 February 1966) is a retired Qatari long-distance runner who specialized in the 3000 and 5000 metres.

== Biography ==
Ahmed Ibrahim Hashim has medals from the Asian Championships, the Gulf Cooperation Council Championships, the West Asian Games and the Pan Arab Championships.

== International competitions ==
Year	Competition	Venue	Position	Notes
Representing Qatar
1994	Asian Games	Hiroshima, Japan	2nd	5,000 m
1997	Pan Arab Games	Beirut, Lebanon	1st	5,000 m
1998	Asian Games	Bangkok, Thailand	2nd	5,000 m
1998	Asian Games	Bangkok, Thailand	2nd	10,000 m
1998	Asian Championships	Fukuoka, Japan	3rd	5,000 m
1999	Pan Arab Games	Irbid, Jordan	1st	10,000 m
2000	Asian Championships	Jakarta, Indonesia	1st	5,000 m
2000	Asian Championships	Jakarta, Indonesia	1st	10,000 m
2002	Asian Games	Busan, South Korea	2nd	10,000 m
2002	World Cup	Madrid, Spain	6th	3,000 m

=== Personal bests ===
- 1500 metres – 3:35.38 min (1994)
- 3000 metres – 7:43.00 min (2000)
- 5000 metres – 13:13.52 min (2000)
- 10,000 metres – 28:02.80 min (2003)
