= Tareq Mubarak Taher =

Kenyan-Bahraini middle-distance runner

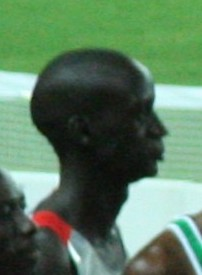
- Tareq Mubarak Taher in 2007

Medal record

Men's athletics

Representing Bahrain

Asian Games
Gold medal – first place	2006 Doha	3000 m st.
Gold medal – first place	2010 Guangzhou	3000 m st.

Asian Championships
Gold medal – first place	2009 Guangzhou	3000 m st.

Asian Indoor Championships
Silver medal – second place	2006 Pattaya	3000 m

Tareq Mubarak Taher, born as Dennis Kipkurui Sang (Arabic: طارق مبارك طاهر, born 1 December 1986), is a middle-distance runner who represents Bahrain after changing nationality from Kenya. His speciality is the 3000 metres steeplechase. His personal best time of 8:06.13 minutes is also the Bahraini national record, set on 13 July 2009 at the Athens Grand Prix Tsiklitiria.

== Ascent in international athletics ==
The allegiance transfer from Kenya to Bahrain took place on 1 January 2005. Taher emerged on the international athletics scene at the 2005 World Cross Country Championships, where he finished ninth in the junior race.

He later competed at the 2005 World Youth Championships in Marrakesh, Morocco, where he won the 2000 metres steeplechase event. Reportedly, Taher "made it look easy" as he let other runners lead the race until he broke away at the final water jump. With the time 5:23.95 minutes he set a new world youth's best performance. The previous best performance belonged to Kenyan Ronald Kipchumba Rutto with 5:27.64 minutes.

== Identity controversy ==
Not soon after, however, questions arose over the identity of Taher. István Gyulai, then-Secretary General of the International Association of Athletics Federations, asked Isaiah Kiplagat, president of Athletics Kenya, to help shed light on the issue. Born in Kenya under a different name, it was claimed that the identity of Taher was altered upon his switch to Bahrain, to qualify for international junior and youth events. According to the East African Standard, Taher had supposedly beaten Eliud Kipchoge in a junior cross-country race in 2001. Kiplagat was quoted as saying that "I have already told IAAF that the two runners are cheats and we have the proof".

Both his former name, substituted with an Arabic name upon arrival in Bahrain, and his reported birth date were subjects of investigation for the following two years. According to the official Bahraini papers, Taher was born 1 December 1989 and named Dennis Sang. This purported birthdate would make him eligible to compete at the 2005 World Youth Championships which is open to athletes aged seventeen and less. However, both Kenya and the IAAF claim that Taher was indeed formerly named Dennis Kipkurui Keter and born on 24 March 1984. If this were the case, Taher would be 21 years old at the time of the World Youth Championships and ineligible to compete.

== Career continues ==
While age investigations were ongoing, Taher was allowed to continue his career both in international junior and senior meets. Three weeks after the World Youth Championships he finished fifteenth in 3000 m steeplechase at the 2005 World Championships. During the 2005–2006 indoor season he won a silver medal at the 2006 Asian Athletics Championships in Pattaya and finished eleventh at the 2006 World Indoor Championships in Moscow, both in the 3000 metres distance as the 3000 metres steeplechase is not contested on indoor arenas. He opened the 2006 outdoor season by finishing nineteenth in the junior race at the 2006 World Cross Country Championships, helping the Bahraini team to a fifth place in the team competition.

At the 2006 World Junior Championships in Beijing, Taher won the silver medal in the steeplechase race. Having crossed the last water jump aside Willy Komen of Kenya, Komen sprinted away on the last stretch to take the gold medal in a new championship record of 8:14.00 minutes. Taher finished in 8:16.64.

Meanwhile, in the same city, the age manipulation case was brought forth at the IAAF Council meeting. The investigation had not yet concluded, but it was reported that there was "strong suspicion of age manipulation". The case had been brought to government level in Kenya as IAAF president Lamine Diack had discussed the issue the previous month with Maina Kamanda, Kenyan Minister for Gender, Sports, Culture and Social Services. Cases had also been opened for two other Bahraini athletes born in Kenya, Belal Mansoor Ali and Aadam Ismaeel Khamis. In addition the Council meeting reported on a similar case, involving Kenyan long-distance runner Thomas Pkemei Longosiwa, who was found to compete with a falsified age in the junior race at the 2006 World Cross Country Championships, the same thing for which Taher was investigated.

Towards the end of the season he finished tenth in 3000 m steeplechase at the 2006 World Athletics Final in Stuttgart, in which he was entitled to run after collecting points during certain designated meets throughout the season. He was then selected to represent Asia at the 2006 World Cup, a meet which gathers one competitor from each continent in each event, and finished eighth in the 3000 metres. His position in Asian steeplechase was consolidated as he won the gold medal at the 2006 Asian Games in Doha. The reigning world champion Saif Saaeed Shaheen, another Kenyan who changed nationality to Qatar, was absent from the Asian Games due to injury.

== Age investigations conclude ==
As the IAAF investigations concluded in 2007, the outcome was reported at the IAAF Council Meeting held in conjunction with the 2007 World Cross Country Championships in Mombasa.

Taher was found guilty of falsifying his age; according to IAAF, it had "emerged that the athlete falsified a birth certificate in order to obtain a Kenyan passport listing his birthday as 1 December 1989, when his real date of birth was 1 December 1986." In addition, his former name was found to be Dennis Kipkurui Sang. Meanwhile, Belal Mansoor Ali was cleared of the same allegations, while the case of Aadam Ismaeel Khamis has not yet concluded. Reportedly, Taher "remained unfazed by the stories of being stripped of his gold medal".

The sanctions pertaining to Taher's over-age in competitions were finally announced in August 2007. His performances at the 2005 World Youth Championships, the 2007 World Cross Country Championships and the 2006 World Junior Championships were annulled, meaning that Taher lost his medals and the world youth best performance. He was not disqualified from senior meets such as the World Championships or the Asian Games or the 2005 World Cross Country Championships because he was found to hold junior age at that time. The disqualifications of Taher were particularly beneficial for Moroccan runner Abdelghani Aït Bahmad, who moved up from fourth place to bronze medal position at both the 2005 World Youth and the 2006 World Junior Championships.

It was still unknown whether the identity was forged by Taher himself or by someone else. If he is found to have forged his identity himself, Taher could face a two-year ban from the sport, similar to the suspension imposed upon first time doping offenders.

== Personal best times ==
His current personal best times are:

- 1500 metres – 3:42.8 minutes (2006)
- 3000 metres – 7:50.31 minutes (2006)
- 3000 metres steeplechase – 8:06.13 minutes (2009) – also the Bahraini record.
