= Hsu Gi-sheng =

Taiwanese long-distance runner

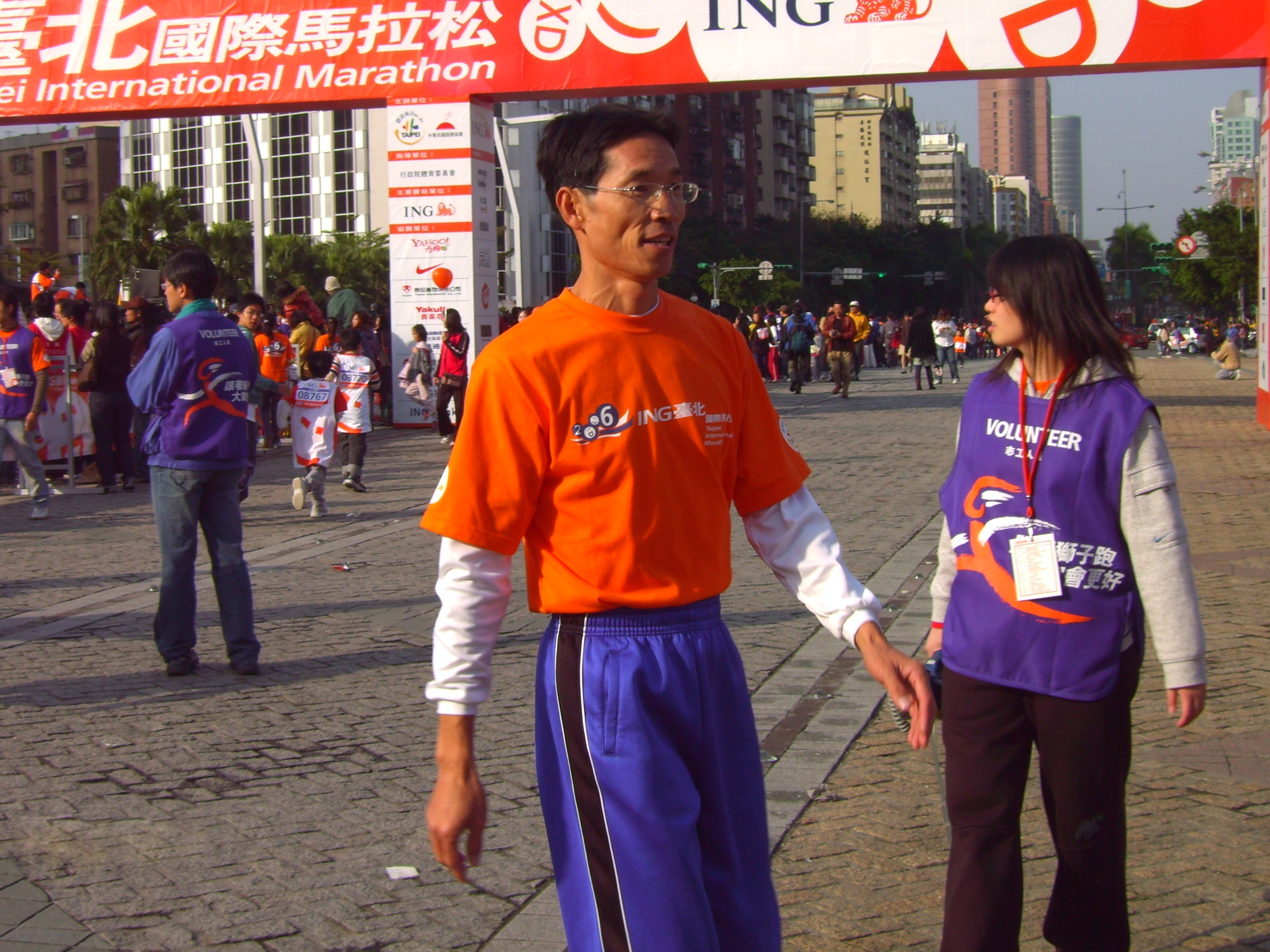

Personal information
- Nationality: Taiwanese
- Born: 2 January 1964 (age 62)

Sport
- Sport: Long-distance running
- Event: Marathon

Hsu Gi-sheng (許績勝; born 2 January 1964) is a Taiwanese long-distance runner. He competed in the men's marathon at the 1996 Summer Olympics. He later became a coach at the National Taiwan Sport University.
