= Saad Al-Asmari =

Saudi Arabian distance runner (born 1968)

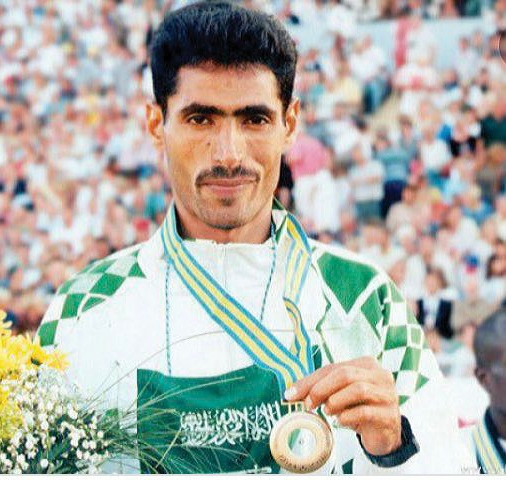

Medal record

Men's athletics

Representing Saudi Arabia

World Championships
Bronze medal – third place	1995 Gothenburg	3000 m steeplechase

Asian Championships
Gold medal – first place	1993 Manila	3000 m steeplechase
Gold medal – first place	1995 Jakarta	5000 m
Gold medal – first place	1995 Jakarta	3000 m steeplechase
Gold medal – first place	1998 Fukuoka	3000 m steeplechase
Silver medal – second place	2002 Colombo	3000 m steeplechase

Saad Shaddad Al-Asmari (Arabic: سعد شداد الأسمري) (born 24 September 1968) is a retired Saudi Arabian runner who specialized in the 3000 metres steeplechase.

He has won five medals from the Asian Championships, three from the Arab Athletics Championships and a gold medal from the 1997 Asian Cross Country Championships. He is remembered as one of the few to break the Kenyan domination in the 1990s of all steeplechase medals in the World Championships when he won the bronze medal in Gothenburg, Sweden in 1995. He still holds the Saudi national record for the 3000 meter steeplechase.

== International competitions ==
Representing Saudi Arabia
Year	Competition	Venue	Position	Event	Notes
1994	Asian Games	Hiroshima, Japan	2nd		
1995	World Championships	Gothenburg, Sweden	3rd	8:12.95 AR	
1995	Military World Games	Rome, Italy	1st		
1997	World Championships	Athens, Greece	4th		
1997	Pan Arab Games	Beirut, Lebanon	1st		
1998	Asian Championships	Fukuoka, Japan	1st		
1998	World Cup	Johannesburg, South Africa	3rd		

== Personal bests ==
- 1500 metres - 3:41.1 min (1994)
- 3000 metres - 8:12.27 min (2000)
- 3000 metres steeplechase - 8:08.14 min (2002)

== See also ==
- List of World Athletics Championships medalists (men)
- List of Asian Games medalists in athletics
- Steeplechase at the World Championships in Athletics
