= Khamis Abdullah Saifeldin =

Qatari steeplechase runner

Personal information
- Born: 1 February 1976 (age 50)

Sport
- Sport: Track and field
Medal record
Representing Qatar
Asian Games
Gold medal – first place	2002 Busan	3000 m steeplechase
Silver medal – second place	2002 Busan	5000 m
Asian Championships
Gold medal – first place	2000 Jakarta	3000 m steeplechase
Gold medal – first place	2002 Colombo	5000 m
Gold medal – first place	2002 Colombo	3000 m steeplechase
Gold medal – first place	2003 Manila	3000 m steeplechase
Summer Universiade
Silver medal – second place	1999 Palma de Mallorca	3000 m steeplechase

Khamis Abdullah Saifeldin (Arabic: خميس عبدالله سيف الدين; born 1 February 1976) is a Qatari runner who specialized in the 3000 metre steeplechase. He is of Sudanese descent. He represented Sudan at the 1996 Summer Olympics and Qatar at the 2000 Summer Olympics and the 2004 Summer Olympics.

In addition he has medals from the Asian Athletics Championships, the Gulf Cooperation Council Championships, the West Asian Games and the Arab Athletics Championships.

== International competitions ==
Year	Competition	Venue	Position	Notes
Representing Qatar
1999	Universiade	Palma de Mallorca, Spain	2nd	3000 m s'chase
1999	Military World Games	Zagreb, Croatia	1st	3000 m s'chase
2000	Asian Championships	Jakarta, Indonesia	1st	3000 m s'chase
2000	Olympic Games	Sydney, Australia	10th	3000 m s'chase
2001	World Championships	Edmonton, Canada	7th	3000 m s'chase
2002	Asian Games	Busan, South Korea	1st	3000 m s'chase
2002	Asian Games	Busan, South Korea	2nd	5000 m
2002	World Cup	Madrid, Spain]	3rd	3000 m s'chase
2003	Asian Championships	Manila, Philippines	1st	3000 m s'chase
2003	World Championships	Paris, France	12th	3000 m s'chase

== Personal bests ==
- 1500 metres - 3:44.26 min (2004)
- 3000 metres - 8:04.41 min (1999)
- 3000 metre steeplechase - 8:13.45 min (2002)
- 5000 metres - 13:36.93 min (1999)
