= Abdelhak Zakaria =

Moroccan-Bahraini long-distance runner

Medal record

Men's Sport of athletics

Representing Bahrain

Asian Championships
Silver medal – second place	2002 Colombo	5000 m
Silver medal – second place	2003 Manila	10,000 m

Mohammed Abdelhak Zakaria (born Abdelhaq El Gourch on 20 July 1974) is a retired Moroccan-Bahraini long-distance runner. He switched nationality from his birth country of Morocco.

== Achievements ==
Year	Competition	Venue	Position	Event	Notes
Representing Bahrain
2002	Asian Games	Busan, South Korea	2nd	5000 m	
2002	Asian Games	Busan, South Korea	3rd	10,000 m	
2002	Asian Championships	Colombo, Sri Lanka	2nd	5000 m	
2002	World Cup	Madrid, Spain	7th	5000 m	
2003	Asian Championships	Manila, Philippines	2nd	10,000 m	
2007	World Championships	Osaka, Japan	—	Marathon	DNF
2007	Pan Arab Games	Cairo, Egypt	3rd	Half marathon	1:03:26

=== Personal bests ===
- 3000 metres - 7:40.16 min (1998)
- 5000 metres - 13:18.19 min (2003)
- 10,000 metres - 28:07.9 min (1999)
- Half marathon - 1:01:24 hrs (2006)
- Marathon - 2:11:49 hrs (2006)
