= Eduardo Buenavista =

Filipino long-distance runner

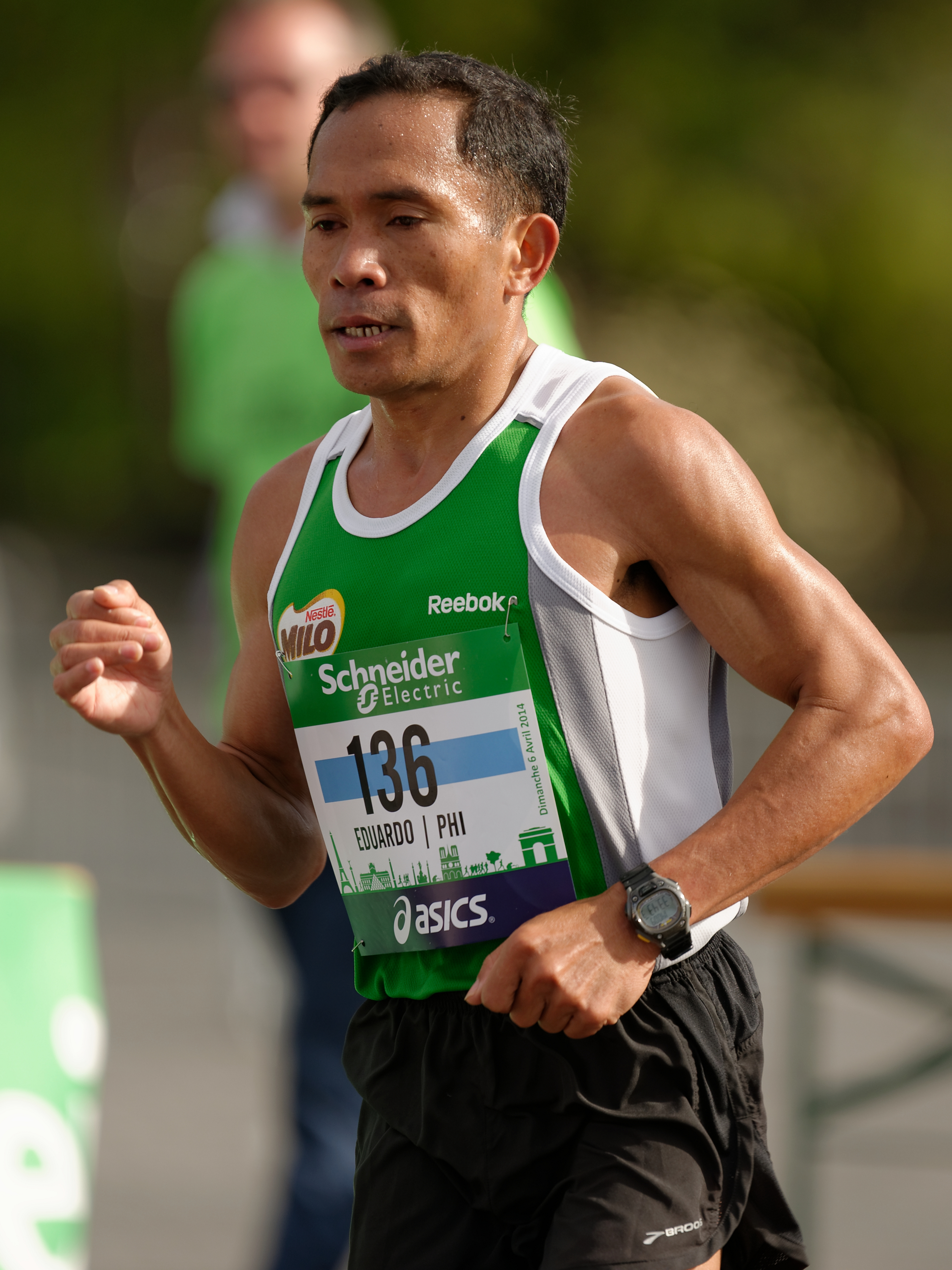
- Buenavista at the 2014 Paris Marathon

Personal information
- Nationality: Filipino
- Born: 13 October 1978 (age 47) Santo Niño, South Cotabato, Philippines
- Height: 5 ft 0 in (152 cm)
- Weight: 137 lb (62 kg)

Sport
- Sport: Running

Achievements and titles
- Personal bests: 3000 m: 8:17.14 (2002); 3000 m Steeplechase: 8:40.77 (2001); 5000 m: 13:58.43 (2002); 10000 m: 29:02.36 (2002); 10000 m Road: 30:20 (2005); Half Marathon: 1:03:42 (2005); Marathon: 2:18:53 (2007)
Medal record
Men's athletics
Representing Philippines
Asian Championships
Bronze medal – third place	2003 Manila	10,000 m
Southeast Asian Games
Gold medal – first place	2001 Kuala Lumpur	3000 m st.
Gold medal – first place	2001 Kuala Lumpur	5000 m
Gold medal – first place	2003 Hanoi	10,000m
Gold medal – first place	2009 Vientiane	Marathon
Silver medal – second place	2003 Hanoi	5000m
Silver medal – second place	2005 Manila	10,000m
Bronze medal – third place	2007 Nakhon Ratchasima	Marathon
Bronze medal – third place	2011 Palembang	Marathon

Eduardo Buenavista (born 13 October 1978 in Santo Niño, South Cotabato) is a Filipino long-distance runner and two-time Olympian. He holds the Philippine record for multiple long-distance events.

His best marathon time is 2:18:44 hours. He also formerly held the Philippine 5000 metres record of 13 minutes, 58 seconds, and performed the 10,000 metres in 29:02.36 minutes.

"Vertek", as called by his friends and the media, finished 67th in the 2004 Athens Olympic marathon. He was a silver medallist in the 23rd Southeast Asian Games in the 10,000m run. He has also won many road races in the Philippines, distance races on previous South East Asian Games the Adidas King of the Road in South Korea and the Adidas King of the Road 2012 in Singapore.

== International competitions ==
Year	Competition	Venue	Position	Notes
Representing the Philippines
2000	Olympic Games	Sydney, Australia	37	3000 m Steeplechase
2001	Southeast Asian Games	Kuala Lumpur, Malaysia	1st	3000 m Steeplechase
2001	Southeast Asian Games	Kuala Lumpur, Malaysia	1st	5000 m
2002	Asian Games	Busan, South Korea	9th	5000 m
2002	Asian Games	Busan, South Korea	8th	10000 m
2003	Asian Championships	Manila, Philippines	3rd	10,000 m
2004	Olympic Games	Athens, Greece	67th	Marathon
2006	Asian Games	Doha, Qatar	12	Marathon
2010	Asian Games	Guangzhou, China	17	Marathon

== Personal bests ==
Event	Time	Date	Location
3000 m	8:10.18	26 May 2002	Manila, Philippines
3000 m Steeplechase	8:37.62	12 September 2001	Kuala Lumpur, Malaysia
5000 m	13:58.43	10 October 2002	Busan, South Korea
10000 m	29:02.32	7 October 2002	Busan, South Korea
10000 m Road	30:19.8	26 June 2005	Jakarta, Indonesia
Half Marathon	1:03:57	27 March 2005	Incheon, South Korea
Marathon	2:18:56	22 July 2007	Manila, Philippines
