= 2012 European Athletics Championships – Men's 1500 metres =

Men's 1500 metres at the European Athletics Championships

The men's 1500 metres at the 2012 European Athletics Championships was held at the Helsinki Olympic Stadium on 30 June and 1 July.

== Medalists ==
Gold	Henrik Ingebrigtsen; Norway
Silver	Florian Carvalho; France
Bronze	David Bustos; Spain

== Records ==
Standing records prior to the 2012 European Athletics Championships
World record	Hicham El Guerrouj (MAR)	3:26.00	Rome, Italy	14 July 1998
European record	Fermín Cacho (ESP)	3:28.95	Zürich, Switzerland	13 August 1997
Championship record	Fermín Cacho (ESP)	3:35.27	Helsinki, Finland	9 August 1994
World Leading	Silas Kiplagat (KEN)	3:29.63	Doha, Qatar	11 May 2012
European Leading	İlham Tanui Özbilen (TUR)	3:33.32	Doha, Qatar	11 May 2012

== Schedule ==
Date	Time	Round
30 June 2012	13:45	Round 1
1 July 2012	18:50	Final

== Results ==
=== Round 1 ===
First 4 in each heat (Q) and 4 best performers (q) advance to the Final.

Rank	Heat	Lane	Name	Nationality	Time	Note
1	1	5	Andreas Vojta	Austria	3:41.24	Q
2	1	9	İlham Tanui Özbilen	Turkey	3:41.38	Q
3	1	14	Dmitrijs Jurkevičs	Latvia	3:41.45	Q
4	1	7	Florian Carvalho	France	3:41.50	Q
5	1	11	Hélio Gomes	Portugal	3:41.56	q
6	1	10	Abdellah Haidane	Italy	3:41.61	q
7	1	13	Bartosz Nowicki	Poland	3:41.82	q
8	1	12	Goran Nava	Serbia	3:41.96	q
9	1	8	Andreas Bueno	Denmark	3:42.81	
10	1	2	Mateusz Demczyszak	Poland	3:43.97	
11	2	4	Niclas Sandells	Finland	3:45.74	Q
12	2	1	Florian Orth	Germany	3:45.87	Q
13	2	14	David Bustos	Spain	3:46.12	Q
14	2	2	Henrik Ingebrigtsen	Norway	3:46.14	Q
15	2	3	Álvaro Rodríguez	Spain	3:46.33	
16	2	9	Raul Botezan	Romania	3:46.39	
17	1	6	Carsten Schlangen	Germany	3:46.52	
18	2	8	Gregory Beugnet	France	3:46.53	
19	1	4	Siarhei Krylou	Belarus	3:46.93	SB
20	2	6	Brenton Rowe	Austria	3:47.18	
21	2	11	Paul Robinson	Ireland	3:47.26	
22	2	13	Thomas Lancashire	Great Britain	3:47.80	
23	2	10	Krzysztof Żebrowski	Poland	3:48.00	
24	2	5	Kemal Koyuncu	Turkey	3:48.01	
25	2	7	Stefan Breit	Switzerland	3:50.79	
26	2	12	David Karonei	Luxembourg	3:50.93	
27	1	3	Thomas Solberg Eide	Norway	3:54.46	
	1	1	Manuel Olmedo	Spain	DNF	

=== Final ===
Rank	Lane	Name	Nationality	Time	Note
1st place, gold medalist(s)	11	Henrik Ingebrigtsen	Norway	3:46.20	
2nd place, silver medalist(s)	10	Florian Carvalho	France	3:46.33	
3rd place, bronze medalist(s)	7	David Bustos	Spain	3:46.45	
4	9	Hélio Gomes	Portugal	3:46.50	
5	1	Bartosz Nowicki	Poland	3:46.69	
6	2	Dmitrijs Jurkevičs	Latvia	3:47.36	
7	3	Goran Nava	Serbia	3:47.74	
8	5	Abdellah Haidane	Italy	3:47.79	
9	12	Andreas Vojta	Austria	3:53.23	
10	8	Florian Orth	Germany	3:58.54	
11	6	Niclas Sandells	Finland	4:03.34	
	4	İlham Tanui Özbilen	Turkey	~~3:46.85~~	DQ
