= 2009 European Athletics Indoor Championships – Men's 1500 metres =

The Men's 1500 metres event at the 2009 European Athletics Indoor Championships was held on March 7–8.

== Medalists ==
| Gold | Silver | Bronze |
|---|---|---|
| Rui Silva; Portugal | Diego Ruíz; Spain | Yoann Kowal; France |

== Results ==
=== Heats ===
First 3 of each heat (Q) and the next 3 fastest (q) qualified for the final.

| Rank | Heat | Name | Nationality | Time | Notes |
|---|---|---|---|---|---|
| 1 | 1 | Wolfram Müller | Germany | 3:41.37 | Q |
| 2 | 1 | Diego Ruíz | Spain | 3:41.41 | Q |
| 3 | 1 | Yoann Kowal | France | 3:41.59 | Q |
| 4 | 1 | Goran Nava | Serbia | 3:41.60 | q, NR |
| 5 | 1 | Christian Obrist | Italy | 3:41.61 | q |
| 6 | 1 | Neil Speaight | Great Britain | 3:41.96 | q |
| 7 | 1 | Dennis Licht | Netherlands | 3:42.18 | |
| 8 | 1 | Oleksandr Borysyuk | Ukraine | 3:42.65 | PB |
| 9 | 2 | Rui Silva | Portugal | 3:42.89 | Q |
| 10 | 2 | Álvaro Rodríguez | Spain | 3:42.90 | Q |
| 11 | 2 | Arturo Casado | Spain | 3:43.02 | Q |
| 12 | 2 | Carsten Schlangen | Germany | 3:43.45 | |
| 13 | 2 | Guillaume Éraud | France | 3:43.67 | |
| 14 | 2 | Łukasz Parszczyński | Poland | 3:44.27 | |
| 15 | 1 | Niclas Sandells | Finland | 3:44.63 | |
| 16 | 2 | Vyacheslav Sokolov | Russia | 3:46.29 | |
| 17 | 1 | Bruno Albuquerque | Portugal | 3:47.08 | |
| 18 | 2 | Péter Szemeti | Hungary | 3:49.65 | |
| 19 | 2 | Mikael Bergdahl | Finland | 3:50.59 | |
| 20 | 2 | Bas Eefting | Netherlands | 3:54.62 | |
| 21 | 1 | Barnabás Bene | Hungary | 3:57.13 | |
| 22 | 2 | Cene Šubic | Slovenia | 3:57.85 | |
| | 2 | Gezachw Yossef | Israel | DNF | |

=== Final ===
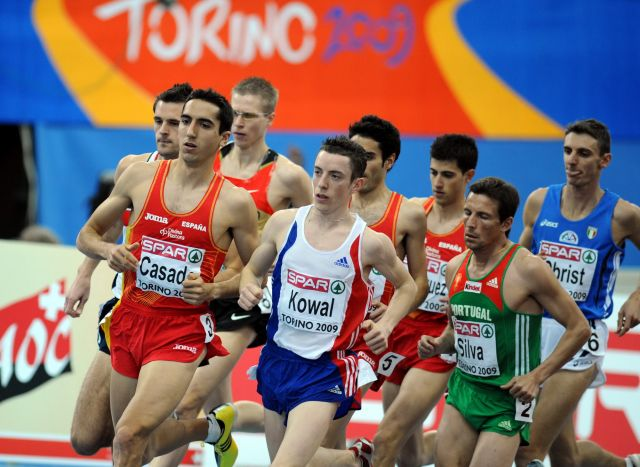
The final of the event.

| Rank | Name | Nationality | Time | Notes |
|---|---|---|---|---|
| 1st place, gold medalist(s) | Rui Silva | Portugal | 3:44.38 | |
| 2nd place, silver medalist(s) | Diego Ruíz | Spain | 3:44.70 | |
| 3rd place, bronze medalist(s) | Yoann Kowal | France | 3:44.75 | |
| 4 | Wolfram Müller | Germany | 3:44.95 | |
| 5 | Arturo Casado | Spain | 3:45.17 | |
| 6 | Christian Obrist | Italy | 3:45.47 | |
| 7 | Álvaro Rodríguez | Spain | 3:46.86 | |
| 8 | Goran Nava | Serbia | 3:48.65 | |
| 9 | Neil Speaight | Great Britain | 3:51.04 | |
