= 2011 European Athletics Indoor Championships – Men's 1500 metres =

The Men's 1500 metres event at the 2011 European Athletics Indoor Championships was held on March 5–6 with the final being held on March 6 at 16:20 local time.

== Records ==
Standing records prior to the 2011 European Athletics Indoor Championships
World record	Hicham El Guerrouj (MAR)	3:31.18	Stuttgart, Germany	2 February 1997
European record	Andrés Manuel Díaz (ESP)	3:33.32	Piraeus, Greece	24 February 1999
Championship record	Ivan Heshko (UKR)	3:36.70	Madrid, Spain	6 March 2005
World Leading	Augustine Kiprono Choge (KEN)	3:33.23	Birmingham, United Kingdom	19 February 2011
European Leading	Mehdi Baala (FRA)	3:35.97	Karlsruhe, Germany	13 February 2011

== Results ==
=== Heats ===
First 2 in each heat and 3 best performers advance to the Final.

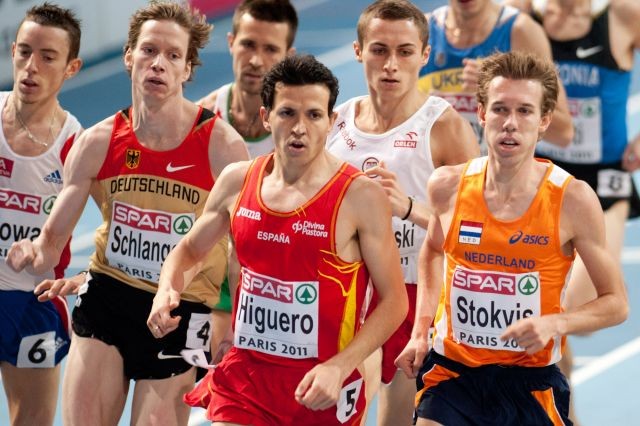
Heat 3 of the 1500 metres.

Rank	Heat	Name	Nationality	Time	Notes
1	1	Manuel Olmedo	Spain	3:43.51	Q, SB
2	1	Kemal Koyuncu	Turkey	3:43.57	Q, PB
3	1	Bartosz Nowicki	Poland	3:43.75	q
4	1	Goran Nava	Serbia	3:43.78	q
5	1	Jamale Aarrass	France	3:45.16	q
6	1	Wouter de Boer	Netherlands	3:45.79	PB
7	3	Carsten Schlangen	Germany	3:47.06	Q
8	2	Diego Ruiz	Spain	3:47.32	Q
9	2	Jakub Holuša	Czech Republic	3:47.39	Q
10	1	Florian Orth	Germany	3:47.47	
11	3	Juan Carlos Higuero	Spain	3:47.50	Q
12	2	Mateusz Demczyszak	Poland	3:47.67	
13	3	Oleksandr Borysyuk	Ukraine	3:47.84	
14	3	René Stokvis	Netherlands	3:48.27	
15	3	Yoann Kowal	France	3:48.51	
16	2	Christoph Lohse	Germany	3:48.52	
17	3	Adam Czerwiński	Poland	3:48.55	
18	2	Nick McCormick	Great Britain	3:48.65	
19	2	Ate van der Burgt	Netherlands	3:48.97	
20	2	Hélio Gomes	Portugal	3:49.22	
21	1	Andreas Vojta	Austria	3:49.24	
22	2	Kristof Van Malderen	Belgium	3:49.85	
23	3	Roman Fosti	Estonia	3:49.98	
24	3	Barnabás Bene	Hungary	3:50.24	
25	1	Colin McCourt	Great Britain	3:52.56	

=== Final ===
The final was held at 16:20.

Rank	Name	Nationality	Time	Notes
1st place, gold medalist(s)	Manuel Olmedo	Spain	3:41.03	SB
2nd place, silver medalist(s)	Kemal Koyuncu	Turkey	3:41.18	NR
3rd place, bronze medalist(s)	Bartosz Nowicki	Poland	3:41.48	
4	Carsten Schlangen	Germany	3:41.55	
5	Jakub Holuša	Czech Republic	3:41.57	SB
6	Juan Carlos Higuero	Spain	3:42.29	SB
7	Goran Nava	Serbia	3:42.37	SB
8	Jamale Aarrass	France	3:44.08	
9	Diego Ruiz	Spain	3:51.67	
