= Athletics at the 2012 Summer Olympics – Men's 1500 metres =

Men's 1500 metres at the Games of the XXX Olympiad
- Olympic Athletics
- Venue: Olympic Stadium
- Dates: 3–7 August
- Competitors: 43 from 29 nations
- Winning time: 3:34.08

Medalists
1st place, gold medalist(s)		Taoufik Makhloufi; Algeria
2nd place, silver medalist(s)		Leonel Manzano; United States
3rd place, bronze medalist(s)		Abdalaati Iguider; Morocco

Official Video

The men's 1500 metres competition at the 2012 Summer Olympics in London, United Kingdom, was held at the Olympic Stadium on 3–7 August. Forty-three athletes from 29 nations competed. The event was won by Taoufik Makhloufi of Algeria, the nation's first title and medal in the event since 1996. Leonel Manzano's silver was the first medal for the United States in the men's 1500 metres since 1968. Morocco earned its fourth medal in six Games with Abdalaati Iguider's bronze. Kenya's four-Games podium streak ended.

== Summary ==
The first round races were all very tightly packed, strategic affairs. The first race was the fastest, taking all but one of the time qualifiers into the semi-final. Andrew Wheating's 3:40.92 in the second heat was the slowest time qualifier, though it was exactly equal to Nick Willis' winning time in the last race. That race was broken up when Nixon Chepseba tripped sending several athletes scrambling to avoid the falling body. Chepseba ultimately finished 9th but was awarded a place in the semi-final on appeal, though no offending athlete was disqualified.

The first semi final was strategic from the start, when the sprinting started, Taoufik Makhloufi easily took the lead and held the position. Since it was strategic, no time qualifiers came from this semi. In the other semi, Chepseba took it out at a faster pace, to avoid getting caught in traffic. At the 800 mark, Nathan Brannen fell flat and was not able to get back into contention. When the sprinting started, Abdalaati Iguider looked to be the fastest. The slowest time qualifier was almost 7 seconds faster than Makhloufi winning the first.

Earlier on the day before the final, Makhloufi was also in an 800 metres qualifying round race, but he ran slowly and dropped out. Because of the "honest effort" rule, he was disqualified from further competition in the Olympics. Algerian team officials successfully appealed for his re-instatement claiming a knee injury.

Kenyan Chepseba, and Kenyan born Bahraini Belal Mansoor Ali ran shoulder to shoulder until 600 to go when Chepseba then decided to take the lead solo. Behind him runners were three abreast, with Makhloufi and Silas Kiplagat trading elbows to be in position for the final lap. Another elbow just before 300 to go, and Makhloufi broke away with Kiplagat and Mekonnen Gebremedhin in pursuit. With Makhloufi gone, 8 meters ahead, Gebremedhin took over second at the head of the stretch, Iguider sprinting a step behind. Five meters further back, Leonel Manzano was starting to sprint around teammate Matthew Centrowitz, Jr. As Iguider was edging ahead of Gebremedhin, Manzano was and advancing along the outside passing into second 30 meters from the finish. Iguider just barely managed to finish a fraction ahead of the fast closing Centrowitz for the bronze medal.

== Background ==
This was the 27th appearance of the event, which is one of 12 athletics events to have been held at every Summer Olympics. Five finalists from 2008 returned: gold medalist Asbel Kiprop of Kenya, silver medalist Nicholas Willis of New Zealand, fifth-place finisher Abdalaati Iguider of Morocco, seventh-place finisher Belal Mansoor Ali of Bahrain, and eighth-place finisher Andrew Baddeley of Great Britain. Kiprop was the reigning world champion as well as defending gold medalist; the rest of the Kenyan team (Silas Kiplagat and Nixon Chepseba) was strong as well, with an outside chance of a medal sweep considered.

Latvia made its first appearance in the event. The United States made its 26th appearance, most of all nations (having missed only the boycotted 1980 Games).

== Qualification ==
A National Olympic Committee (NOC) could enter up to 3 qualified athletes in the men's 1500 metres event if all athletes met the A standard, or 1 athlete if they met the B standard. The maximum number of athletes per nation had been set at 3 since the 1930 Olympic Congress. The qualifying time standards could be obtained in various meets during the qualifying period that had the approval of the IAAF. Indoor and outdoor meets were eligible. The A standard for the 2012 men's 1500 metres was 3:35.50; the B standard was 3:38.00. The qualifying period for was from 1 May 2011 to 8 July 2012. NOCs could also have an athlete enter the 1500 metres through a universality place. NOCs could enter one male athlete in an athletics event, regardless of time, if they had no male athletes meeting the qualifying A or B standards in any men's athletic event.

== Competition format ==
The men's 1500m competition consisted of heats (Round 1), semifinals and a final. In Round 1 the first six in each heat plus the next six fastest overall advanced to the semifinals. In the semifinals the first five in each heat along with the next two fastest overall qualified for the final.

== Records ==
Prior to this competition, the existing world and Olympic records and world leading times were as follows:

World record	Hicham El Guerrouj (MAR)	3:26.00	Rome, Italy	14 July 1998
Olympic record	Noah Ngeny (KEN)	3:32.07	Sydney, Australia	29 September 2000

2012 World leading	Asbel Kiprop (KEN)	3:28.88	Fontvieille, Monaco	20 July 2012

The following national records were set during this competition

Nation	Athlete	Round	Time
Norway	Henrik Ingebrigtsen	Final	3:35.43

== Schedule ==
All times are British Summer Time (UTC+1)

Date	Time	Round
Friday, 3 August 2012	20:05	Round 1
Sunday, 5 August 2012	20:15	Semifinals
Tuesday, 7 August 2012	21:00	Final

== Results ==
Official Video of First Round

=== Round 1 ===
Qual. rule: first 6 of each heat (Q) plus the 6 fastest times (q) qualified.

==== Heat 1 ====
Rank	Athlete	Nation	Time	Notes
1	Taoufik Makhloufi	Algeria	3:35.15	Q
2	Mekonnen Gebremedhin	Ethiopia	3:36.56	Q
3	Asbel Kiprop	Kenya	3:36.59	Q
4	Ross Murray	Great Britain	3:36.74	Q
5	Mohamad Al-Garni	Qatar	3:36.99	Q
6	Leonel Manzano	United States	3:37.00	Q
7	Florian Carvalho	France	3:37.05	q, SB
8	Mohamed Moustaoui	Morocco	3:37.41	q
9	Ryan Gregson	Australia	3:38.54	q
10	Belal Mansoor Ali	Bahrain	3:38.69	q
11	Yegor Nikolayev	Russia	3:38.92	q, SB
12	Álvaro Rodríguez	Spain	3:41.54	
13	Teklit Teweldebrhan	Eritrea	3:42.88	
14	Mamadou Barry	Guinea	4:05.08	
15	Rabiou Guero Gao	Niger	4:05.46	

==== Heat 2 ====
Rank	Athlete	Nation	Time	Notes
1	Mohammed Shaween	Saudi Arabia	3:39.42	Q, SB
2	Hamza Driouch	Qatar	3:39.67	Q
3	İlham Tanui Özbilen	Turkey	3:39.70	Q
4	Silas Kiplagat	Kenya	3:39.79	Q
5	Nathan Brannen	Canada	3:39.95	Q
6	Andrew Baddeley	Great Britain	3:40.34	Q
7	Andrew Wheating	United States	3:40.92	q
8	David Bustos	Spain	3:41.34	
9	Dmitrijs Jurkevičs	Latvia	3:41.40	
10	Dawit Wolde	Ethiopia	3:41.81	
11	Niclas Sandells	Finland	3:42.67	
12	Jamale Aarrass	France	3:45.13	
13	Mohamed Mohamed	Somalia	3:46.16	
14	Nabil Mohammed Al-Garbi	Yemen	3:55.46	SB
—	Amine Laâlou	Morocco	DNS	

==== Heat 3 ====
Rank	Athlete	Nation	Time	Notes
1	Nick Willis	New Zealand	3:40.92	Q
2	Abdalaati Iguider	Morocco	3:41.08	Q
3	Yoann Kowal	France	3:41.12	Q
4	Henrik Ingebrigtsen	Norway	3:41.33	Q
5	Matthew Centrowitz, Jr.	United States	3:41.39	Q
6	Carsten Schlangen	Germany	3:41.51	Q
7	Diego Ruiz	Spain	3:41.52	
8	Aman Wote	Ethiopia	3:41.67	
9	Nixon Chepseba	Kenya	3:42.29	q
10	Emad Noor	Saudi Arabia	3:42.95	
11	Eduar Villanueva	Venezuela	3:43.11	
12	Andreas Vojta	Austria	3:43.52	
13	Ciarán O'Lionaird	Ireland	3:48.35	SB
14	Samuel Vázquez	Puerto Rico	3:49.19	

=== Semifinals ===
Official Video of Semifinal Round

Qual. rule: first 5 of each semifinal (Q) plus the 2 fastest times (q) qualified.

==== Semifinal 1 ====
Rank	Athlete	Nation	Time	Notes
1	Taoufik Makhloufi	Algeria	3:42.25	Q
2	Asbel Kiprop	Kenya	3:42.92	Q
3	Mekonnen Gebremedhin	Ethiopia	3:42.93	Q
4	Leonel Manzano	United States	3:42.94	Q
5	Henrik Ingebrigtsen	Norway	3:43.26	Q
6	Mohamed Moustaoui	Morocco	3:43.33	
7	Mohammed Shaween	Saudi Arabia	3:43.39	
8	Yoann Kowal	France	3:43.48	
9	Andrew Wheating	United States	3:44.88	
10	Ross Murray	Great Britain	3:44.92	
11	Hamza Driouch	Qatar	3:49.40	
12	Ryan Gregson	Australia	3:51.86	

==== Semifinal 2 ====
Rank	Athlete	Nation	Time	Notes
1	Abdalaati Iguider	Morocco	3:34.00	Q, SB
2	Silas Kiplagat	Kenya	3:34.60	Q
3	Nick Willis	New Zealand	3:34.70	Q
4	Nixon Chepseba	Kenya	3:34.89	Q
5	Matthew Centrowitz, Jr.	United States	3:34.90	Q, SB
6	İlham Tanui Özbilen	Turkey	3:35.18	q
7	Belal Mansoor Ali	Bahrain	3:35.40	q, SB
8	Andrew Baddeley	Great Britain	3:36.03	
9	Mohamad Al-Garni	Qatar	3:36.78	
10	Yegor Nikolayev	Russia	3:37.28	PB
11	Carsten Schlangen	Germany	3:38.23	
12	Nathan Brannen	Canada	3:39.26	
13	Florian Carvalho	France	3:40.61	

=== Final ===
Rank	Athlete	Nation	Time	Notes
1st place, gold medalist(s)	Taoufik Makhloufi	Algeria	3:34.08	
2nd place, silver medalist(s)	Leonel Manzano	United States	3:34.79	SB
3rd place, bronze medalist(s)	Abdalaati Iguider	Morocco	3:35.13	
4	Matthew Centrowitz, Jr.	United States	3:35.17	
5	Henrik Ingebrigtsen	Norway	3:35.43	NR
6	Mekonnen Gebremedhin	Ethiopia	3:35.44	
7	Silas Kiplagat	Kenya	3:36.19	
8	İlham Tanui Özbilen	Turkey	3:36.72	
9	Nick Willis	New Zealand	3:36.94	
10	Belal Mansoor Ali	Bahrain	3:37.98	
11	Nixon Chepseba	Kenya	3:39.04	
12	Asbel Kiprop	Kenya	3:43.83	
