= 2006 World Junior Championships in Athletics – Men's 1500 metres =

The men's 1500 metres event at the 2006 World Junior Championships in Athletics was held in Beijing, China, at Chaoyang Sports Centre on 15 and 17 August.

== Medalists ==
Gold	Remmy Limo Ndiwa; Kenya
Silver	Abdalaati Iguider; Morocco
Bronze	Belal Mansour Ali; Bahrain

== Results ==
=== Final ===
17 August

Rank	Name	Nationality	Time	Notes
1st place, gold medalist(s)	Remmy Limo Ndiwa	Kenya	3:40.44	
2nd place, silver medalist(s)	Abdalaati Iguider	Morocco	3:40.73	
3rd place, bronze medalist(s)	Belal Mansour Ali	Bahrain	3:41.36	
4	Geoffrey Kipkoech Rono	Kenya	3:41.68	
5	Tsegai Tewelde	Eritrea	3:42.10	
6	Fouad El-Kaam	Morocco	3:42.59	
7	Álvaro Rodríguez	Spain	3:42.71	
8	Abdel Ghani Bensaadi	Algeria	3:44.67	
9	Otmane Belharbazi	France	3:45.39	
10	Andrew Bumbalough	United States	3:46.89	
11	Jimmy Adar	Uganda	3:48.16	
12	Abdalla Abdel Gadir	Sudan	3:49.27	

=== Heats ===
15 August

==== Heat 1 ====
Rank	Name	Nationality	Time	Notes
1	Remmy Limo Ndiwa	Kenya	3:50.22	Q
2	Abdalaati Iguider	Morocco	3:50.23	Q
3	Abdalla Abdel Gadir	Sudan	3:52.39	Q
4	Simon Ayeko	Uganda	3:52.91	
5	Jordan Chipangama	Zambia	3:54.17	
6	Péter Szemeti	Hungary	3:54.52	
7	Justin Marpole-Bird	Canada	3:54.88	
8	Víctor Benito	Spain	3:55.09	
9	Riku Marttinen	Finland	3:58.67	
10	Gao Jie	China	3:59.54	
11	Djamchi Attoumani	Comoros	4:09.89	

==== Heat 2 ====
Rank	Name	Nationality	Time	Notes
1	Belal Mansour Ali	Bahrain	3:43.50	Q
2	Fouad El-Kaam	Morocco	3:44.21	Q
3	Otmane Belharbazi	France	3:45.87	Q
4	Andrew Bumbalough	United States	3:47.08	q
5	Pascal Sarwat	Tanzania	3:47.14	
6	Tshamano Setone	South Africa	3:47.49	
7	Jean Claude Niyonizigiye	Burundi	3:47.98	
8	Falko Zauber	Germany	3:48.22	
9	Zhang Guolin	China	3:51.90	
10	Daiki Sato	Japan	3:56.78	
11	Adam Graham	Australia	4:00.32	

==== Heat 3 ====
Rank	Name	Nationality	Time	Notes
1	Geoffrey Kipkoech Rono	Kenya	3:44.90	Q
2	Álvaro Rodríguez	Spain	3:45.59	Q
3	Jimmy Adar	Uganda	3:45.79	Q
4	Tsegai Tewelde	Eritrea	3:45.81	q
5	Abdel Ghani Bensaadi	Algeria	3:45.87	q
6	Saleh Bakheet	Bahrain	3:49.96	
7	Hayden McLaren	New Zealand	3:50.03	
8	Andrew Acosta	United States	3:50.11	
9	Tom Wiggers	Netherlands	3:52.03	
10	Mourad Amdouni	France	3:55.86	
11	Leeto Hlalele	Lesotho	3:59.89	
12	Mohamed Ould Sidi	Mauritania	4:26.06	

== Participation ==
According to an unofficial count, 34 athletes from 26 countries participated in the event.

- Algeria (1)
- Australia (1)
- Bahrain (2)
- Burundi (1)
- Canada (1)
- China (2)
- Comoros (1)
- Eritrea (1)
- Finland (1)
- France (2)
- Germany (1)
- Hungary (1)
- Japan (1)
- Kenya (2)
- Lesotho (1)
- Mauritania (1)
- Morocco (2)
- Netherlands (1)
- New Zealand (1)
- South Africa (1)
- Spain (2)
- Sudan (1)
- Tanzania (1)
- Uganda (2)
- United States (2)
- Zambia (1)
