= Track and field at the 2015 Military World Games – Men's 3000 metres steeplechase =

The men's 3000 metres steeplechase event at the 2015 Military World Games was held on 5 October at the KAFAC Sports Complex.

== Records ==
Prior to this competition, the existing world and CISM record were as follows:

World Record	Saif Saaeed Shaheen (QAT)	7:53.63	Brussels, Belgium	3 September 2004
CISM World Record	Saad Al-Asmari (KSA)	8:14.13	Rome, Italy	September 1995

== Schedule ==
Date	Time	Round
7 October 2015	15:10	Round 1
8 October 2015	15:00	Final

== Medalists ==
Gold	Silver	Bronze
Amor Ben Yahia; Tunisia	Patrick Kipchumba Chukor; Kenya	Yoann Kowal; France

== Results ==
=== Round 1 ===
Qualification: First 5 in each heat (Q) and next 5 fastest (q) qualified for the final.

Rank	Heat	Name	Nationality	Time	Notes
1	1	Patrick Kipchumba Chukor	Kenya	8:37.35	Q
2	1	John Kibet Koech	Bahrain	8:40.96	Q
3	1	Yoann Kowal	France	8:41.27	Q
4	1	Bilal Tabti	Algeria	8:41.66	Q
5	1	Amor Ben Yahia	Tunisia	8:41.68	Q
6	1	Naveen Kumar	India	8:45.12	q
7	2	Evans Rutto Chematot	Bahrain	8:46.95	Q
8	2	Geoffrey Ngeno	Kenya	8:47.50	Q
9	2	Hicham Bouchicha	Algeria	8:53.51	Q
10	2	Hillary Bor	United States	8:53.58	Q
11	1	Roberto Tello Bolvarán	Chile	8:53.58	q
12	2	Mateusz Demczyszak	Poland	8:57.89	Q
13	2	Zhongji Zhang	China	9:03.36	q
14	2	Atjong Tio Purwanto	Indonesia	9:07.19	q
15	1	Simon Ayeko	Uganda	9:08.43	q
16	1	Matthew Williams	United States	9:09.68	
17	2	András Avar	Hungary	10:44.83	
18	1	Alkhdor Abdullatit	Kuwait	12:05.02	
	2	Nico Sonnenberg	Germany	DQ	R168.6
	2	Byung Hyun Kim	South Korea	DNS	

=== Final ===
Rank	Name	Nationality	Time	Notes
1st place, gold medalist(s)	Amor Ben Yahia	Tunisia	8:24.68	
2nd place, silver medalist(s)	Patrick Kipchumba Chukor	Kenya	8:25.54	
3rd place, bronze medalist(s)	Yoann Kowal	France	8:26.71	
4	Evans Rutto Chematot	Bahrain	8:33.52	
5	John Kibet Koech	Bahrain	8:35.63	
6	Mateusz Demczyszak	Poland	8:38.07	
7	Geoffrey Ngeno	Kenya	8:40.60	
8	Hillary Bor	United States	8:49.14	
9	Bilal Tabti	Algeria	8:50.74	
10	Hicham Bouchicha	Algeria	8:50.89	
11	Naveen Kumar	India	9:01.24	
12	Roberto Tello Bolvarán	Chile	9:02.33	
13	Atjong Tio Purwanto	Indonesia	9:09.45	
14	Simon Ayeko	Uganda	9:23.28	
	Zhongji Zhang	China	DNS	
