= Athletics at the 2007 Summer Universiade – Men's 1500 metres =

The men's 1500 metres event at the 2007 Summer Universiade was held on 9–12 August.

== Medalists ==
Gold	Silver	Bronze
Samir Khadar; Algeria	Álvaro Rodríguez; Spain	Fabiano Peçanha; Brazil

== Results ==
=== Heats ===
Qualification: First 3 of each heat (Q) and the next 3 fastest (q) qualified for the final.

Rank	Heat	Name	Nationality	Time	Notes
1	3	Samir Khadar	Algeria	3:41.87	Q
2	3	Álvaro Rodríguez	Spain	3:42.59	Q
3	2	Fabiano Peçanha	Brazil	3:42.80	Q
4	2	Mirco Zwahlen	Switzerland	3:42.93	Q
5	3	Mitchell Kealey	Australia	3:43.06	Q
6	2	Aleksey Popov	Russia	3:43.25	Q
7	3	Matthew Lincoln	Canada	3:43.32	q
8	2	Max Smith	New Zealand	3:43.68	q
9	3	Emmanuel Bor	Kenya	3:43.89	q
10	1	Pablo Solares	Mexico	3:44.04	Q
11	1	Juan van Deventer	South Africa	3:45.74	Q
12	1	Francisco España	Spain	3:45.87	Q
13	2	Cristian Vorovenci	Romania	3:45.91	
14	1	Geoffrey Martinson	Canada	3:46.40	
15	3	Nikolai Vedehin	Estonia	3:47.09	
16	1	Daniel Spitzl	Austria	3:47.16	
17	2	Hiroshi Ino	Japan	3:47.32	
18	3	Mikael Bergdahl	Finland	3:47.41	
19	3	Cene Šubic	Slovenia	3:47.52	
20	1	Leandro de Oliveira	Brazil	3:48.10	
21	1	Alexandros Kalogerogiannis	Cyprus	3:50.38	
22	3	Roohollah Mohammadi Mirzaei	Iran	3:51.13	PB
23	3	Eoin Everard	Ireland	3:51.36	PB
24	2	Dušan Markešević	Serbia	3:54.11	
25	2	Brian Lindberg	Denmark	3:54.77	
26	2	Teerachai Rayabsri	Thailand	3:55.56	PB
27	1	Nguyen Dinh Cuong	Vietnam	4:00.87	
28	1	Malaba Tchendo	Togo	4:06.16	PB
29	1	Li Guangming	China	4:07.10	
30	1	Bannavong Saysana	Laos	4:10.13	SB
31	2	Bacar Salimou	Comoros	4:15.97	
32	3	Kuenzangi Norbu	Bhutan	4:20.06	
33	1	Gi Ka Man	Hong Kong	4:22.81	
	3	Mario Van Waeyenberge	Belgium	DNF	
	2	Salvador Crespo	Spain	DNS	
	2	Rizgallah Hamza	Sudan	DNS	

=== Final ===
Rank	Name	Nationality	Time	Notes
1st place, gold medalist(s)	Samir Khadar	Algeria	3:39.62	
2nd place, silver medalist(s)	Álvaro Rodríguez	Spain	3:39.78	
3rd place, bronze medalist(s)	Fabiano Peçanha	Brazil	3:40.98	
4	Emmanuel Bor	Kenya	3:41.65	
5	Max Smith	New Zealand	3:42.10	
6	Pablo Solares	Mexico	3:42.11	
7	Aleksey Popov	Russia	3:42.74	
8	Matthew Lincoln	Canada	3:43.18	
9	Mitchell Kealey	Australia	3:45.33	
10	Francisco España	Spain	3:46.28	
11	Mirco Zwahlen	Switzerland	3:46.44	
12	Juan van Deventer	South Africa	3:55.18	
