= 2010 European Athletics Championships – Men's 1500 metres =

Men's 1500 metres at the European Athletics Championships

The men's 1500 metres at the 2010 European Athletics Championships was held at the Estadi Olímpic Lluís Companys on 27, 28 and 30 July.

== Medalists ==
Gold	Arturo Casado; Spain (ESP)
Silver	Carsten Schlangen; Germany (GER)
Bronze	Manuel Olmedo; Spain (ESP)

== Records ==
Standing records prior to the 2010 European Athletics Championships
World record	Hicham El Guerrouj (MAR)	3:26.00	Rome, Italy	14 July 1998
European record	Fermín Cacho (ESP)	3:28.95	Zürich, Switzerland	13 August 1997
Championship record	Fermín Cacho (ESP)	3:35.27	Helsinki, Finland	9 August 1994
World Leading	Silas Kiplagat (KEN)	3:29.27	Monaco	22 July 2010
European Leading	Andrew Baddeley (GBR)	3:34.50	Gateshead, United Kingdom	10 July 2010

== Schedule ==
Date	Time	Round
28 July 2010	20:40	Round 1
30 July 2010	22:00	Final

== Results ==
=== Round 1 ===
==== Heat 1 ====
Rank	Name	Nationality	Time	Notes
1	Andrew Baddeley	Great Britain & N.I.	3:41.46	Q
2	Manuel Olmedo	Spain	3:41.47	Q
3	Carsten Schlangen	Germany	3:41.65	Q
4	Colin McCourt	Great Britain & N.I.	3:41.77	Q
5	Christian Obrist	Italy	3:42.02	q
6	Yoann Kowal	France	3:42.06	q
7	Goran Nava	Serbia	3:42.40	q
8	Kim Ruell	Belgium	3:42.94	
9	Morten Toft Munkholm	Denmark	3:43.05	
10	Rory Chesser	Ireland	3:44.01	
11	Rizak Dirshe	Sweden	3:44.40	
12	Jonas Hamm	Finland	3:44.98	
13	Morten Velde	Norway	3:45.20	

==== Heat 2 ====
Rank	Name	Nationality	Time	Notes
1	Reyes Estévez	Spain	3:40.86	Q
2	Arturo Casado	Spain	3:40.98	Q
3	Thomas Lancashire	Great Britain & N.I.	3:41.68	Q
4	Mateusz Demczyszak	Poland	3:42.15	Q
5	Andreas Vojta	Austria	3:42.16	q
6	Henrik Ingebrigtsen	Norway	3:42.62	
7	Kristof Van Malderen	Belgium	3:42.80	
8	Niclas Sandells	Finland	3:42.82	
9	Thomas Chamney	Ireland	3:43.60	
10	Mikael Bergdahl	Finland	3:43.90	
11	Dmitrijs Jurkevičs	Latvia	3:45.21	
12	Moritz Waldmann	Germany	3:48.60	
13	Péter Szemeti	Hungary	3:52.14	
14	Niels Verwer	Netherlands	3:52.67	

==== Summary ====
Rank	Heat	Name	Nationality	Time	Notes
1	2	Reyes Estévez	Spain	3:40.86	Q
2	2	Arturo Casado	Spain	3:40.98	Q
3	1	Andrew Baddeley	Great Britain & N.I.	3:41.46	Q
4	1	Manuel Olmedo	Spain	3:41.47	Q
5	1	Carsten Schlangen	Germany	3:41.65	Q
6	2	Thomas Lancashire	Great Britain & N.I.	3:41.68	Q
7	1	Colin McCourt	Great Britain & N.I.	3:41.77	Q
8	1	Christian Obrist	Italy	3:42.02	q
9	1	Yoann Kowal	France	3:42.06	q
10	2	Mateusz Demczyszak	Poland	3:42.15	Q
11	2	Andreas Vojta	Austria	3:42.16	q
12	1	Goran Nava	Serbia	3:42.40	q
13	2	Henrik Ingebrigtsen	Norway	3:42.62	
14	2	Kristof Van Malderen	Belgium	3:42.80	
15	2	Niclas Sandells	Finland	3:42.82	
16	1	Kim Ruell	Belgium	3:42.94	
17	1	Morten Toft Munkholm	Denmark	3:43.05	
18	2	Thomas Chamney	Ireland	3:43.60	
19	2	Mikael Bergdahl	Finland	3:43.90	
20	1	Rory Chesser	Ireland	3:44.01	
21	1	Rizak Dirshe	Sweden	3:44.40	
22	1	Jonas Hamm	Finland	3:44.98	
23	1	Morten Velde	Norway	3:45.20	
24	2	Dmitrijs Jurkevičs	Latvia	3:45.21	
25	2	Moritz Waldmann	Germany	3:48.60	
26	2	Péter Szemeti	Hungary	3:52.14	
27	2	Niels Verwer	Netherlands	3:52.67	

=== Final ===
Rank	Name	Nationality	Time	Notes
1st place, gold medalist(s)	Arturo Casado	Spain	3:42.74	
2nd place, silver medalist(s)	Carsten Schlangen	Germany	3:43.52	
3rd place, bronze medalist(s)	Manuel Olmedo	Spain	3:43.54	
4	Reyes Estévez	Spain	3:43.67	
5	Yoann Kowal	France	3:43.71	
6	Andrew Baddeley	Great Britain & N.I.	3:43.87	
7	Christian Obrist	Italy	3:43.91	
8	Mateusz Demczyszak	Poland	3:44.42	
9	Colin McCourt	Great Britain & N.I.	3:44.78	
10	Thomas Lancashire	Great Britain & N.I.	3:44.92	
11	Andreas Vojta	Austria	3:45.68	
12	Goran Nava	Serbia	3:45.77	
