= 2009 European Athletics U23 Championships – Men's 800 metres =

The men's 800 metres event at the 2009 European Athletics U23 Championships was held in Kaunas, Lithuania, at S. Dariaus ir S. Girėno stadionas (Darius and Girėnas Stadium) on 16 and 18 July.

== Medalists ==
Gold	Adam Kszczot; Poland
Silver	Marcin Lewandowski; Poland
Bronze	Robin Schembera; Germany

== Results ==
=== Final ===
18 July

Rank	Name	Nationality	Time	Notes
1st place, gold medalist(s)	Adam Kszczot	Poland	1:45.81	
2nd place, silver medalist(s)	Marcin Lewandowski	Poland	1:46.52	
3rd place, bronze medalist(s)	Robin Schembera	Germany	1:46.63	
4	Dmitrijs Jurkēvičs	Latvia	1:47.24	
5	Artur Ostrowski	Poland	1:48.17	
6	Jeff Lastennet	France	1:48.22	
7	Sören Ludolph	Germany	1:48.31	
8	Sebastian Keiner	Germany	1:48.73	

=== Heats ===
16 July
Qualified: first 2 each heat and 2 best to Final

==== Heat 1 ====
Rank	Name	Nationality	Time	Notes
1	Adam Kszczot	Poland	1:49.60	Q
2	Sebastian Keiner	Germany	1:49.66	Q
3	Paul Bradshaw	United Kingdom	1:49.68	
4	David Palacios	Spain	1:49.77	
5	Jošt Kozan	Slovenia	1:50.52	
6	Aram Davtyan	Armenia	1:52.44	
7	Konstadinos Nakopoulos	Greece	1:53.09	
8	Hamid Oualich	France	1:53.73	

==== Heat 2 ====
Rank	Name	Nationality	Time	Notes
1	Robin Schembera	Germany	1:49.33	Q
2	Artur Ostrowski	Poland	1:49.43	Q
3	Andrew Osagie	United Kingdom	1:49.47	
4	Jakub Holuša	Czech Republic	1:49.63	
5	Eivind Jenssen	Norway	1:51.09	
6	Javier Gálvez	Spain	1:51.16	
7	Abdesslam Merabet	France	1:51.75	
8	Oleg Sologuv	Israel	2:00.17	

==== Heat 3 ====
Rank	Name	Nationality	Time	Notes
1	Sören Ludolph	Germany	1:47.99	Q
2	Dmitrijs Jurkēvičs	Latvia	1:48.14	Q
3	Marcin Lewandowski	Poland	1:48.24	q
4	Jeff Lastennet	France	1:48.41	q
5	Ignacio Laguna	Spain	1:50.16	
6	Vitalij Kozlov	Lithuania	1:52.06	
7	Demetris Filippou	Cyprus	1:53.28	

== Participation ==
According to an unofficial count, 23 athletes from 14 countries participated in the event.

- Armenia (1)
- Cyprus (1)
- Czech Republic (1)
- France (3)
- Germany (3)
- Greece (1)
- Israel (1)
- Latvia (1)
- Lithuania (1)
- Norway (1)
- Poland (3)
- Slovenia (1)
- Spain (3)
- United Kingdom (2)
