= Dušan Markešević =

Serbian long-distance runner

Personal information
- Nationality: Serbian
- Born: February 13, 1986 (age 40) Čačak, Yugoslavia

Sport
- Sport: Track, long-distance running
- Event(s): 5000 metres, 10,000 metres

Achievements and titles
- Personal best(s): 1500m: 3:47.21; 3000m: 8:04.5; 5000m: 13:46.88; 10,000m: 29:16.38
Medal record
Men's athletics
Representing Serbia and Montenegro
European Youth Summer Olympic Festival
Silver medal – second place	2003 Paris	Boys' 3000m
European Cross Country Championships
Bronze medal – third place	2005 Tilburg	Junior men's 6.5K
Representing Serbia
European Cross Country Championships
Silver medal – second place	2006 San Giorgiu	U23 men's 8.03K

Dušan Markešević (born 13 February 1986) is a Serbian long-distance runner who specialized in the various long-distance track and cross country disciplines.

== Running career ==
=== Youth career ===
At the age of 15, Markešević set the 3000-meter national record for the 15-year-old age group with a time of 8:51.58. Markešević made his international debut at the 2003 European Youth Summer Olympic Festival in Paris, France, where he finished second overall in the 3000 meter race. At the 2005 IAAF World Cross Country Championships, Markešević finished in 36th place of 125 finishers in the junior men's 8K race. At the end of the same year, he finished in third overall in the junior men's race at the 2005 European Cross Country Championships. At the 2006 European Cross Country Championships, Markešević placed in second overall against an extremely competitive U23 field, finishing ahead of Daniele Meucci and Yevgeny Rybakov.

=== Senior career ===
Markešević made his senior debut at the 2007 Summer Universiade, where he fielded in the men's 5000 metres and the men's 1500 metres. The following year, he finished in second overall for the 5000-meter race at the 2008 European Cup.
