= Athletics at the 2007 Summer Universiade – Men's 5000 metres =

The men's 5000 metres event at the 2007 Summer Universiade was held on 12 August.

== Results ==
Rank	Name	Nationality	Time	Notes
1st place, gold medalist(s)	Halil Akkaş	Turkey	14:08.47	
2nd place, silver medalist(s)	Yuki Matsuoka	Japan	14:09.33	
3rd place, bronze medalist(s)	Simon Ayeko	Uganda	14:10.13	
4	Yuta Takahashi	Japan	14:11.17	
5	Jesús Antonio Núñez	Spain	14:12.73	
6	Aleksey Aleksandrov	Russia	14:13.74	
7	Isaac Mboyase	South Africa	14:15.50	
8	Omid Mehrabi	Iran	14:17.88	PB
9	Tibor Vegh	Hungary	14:21.84	
10	Tiidrek Nurme	Estonia	14:23.50	
11	Martin Steinbauer	Austria	14:24.31	
12	Javier Guerra	Spain	14:24.36	
13	Dušan Markešević	Serbia	14:29.52	
14	Andrey Safronov	Russia	14:30.14	
15	Domenico Ricatti	Italy	14:35.65	
16	Marius Ionescu	Romania	14:40.19	
17	Patrick Cheptoek	Uganda	14:54.57	
18	Geoffrey Kerr	Canada	15:05.53	
19	José Chaves	Costa Rica	15:06.04	
20	John Wanjohi	Kenya	15:34.89	
21	Boonyu Kaveerattanakajon	Thailand	15:43.12	
22	Dorji Wangchuk	Bhutan	17:00.95	
	Oliver Bodor	Hungary	DNF	
	Mainza Makunga	Zambia	DNS	
	Bacar Salimou	Comoros	DNS	
