= Dmitrijs Jurkevičs =

Latvian middle-distance runner

Dmitrijs Jurkevičs (born 7 January 1987 in Daugavpils) is a Latvian track and field athlete who specialises in middle-distance running. He holds the Latvian record in 1500 metres.

He competed over 1500 metres at the 2005 European Athletics Junior Championships and came sixth in the final. He was a semi-finalist in the 800 metres and the 2006 World Junior Championships in Athletics. He set an 800 m best of 1:46.44 minutes in Sollentuna in 2008 and improved his 1500 m best to 3:39.69 minutes the following year. In his senior world debut, he was eliminated in the 800 m heats at the 2009 World Championships in Athletics. He began to focus on running the 1500 m from 2010 onwards, and he represented Latvia in that event at the 2010 European Athletics Championships. He achieved a Latvian record over 1500 m in Prague in June 2011 and bettered that mark by over a second and a half to 3:37.35 minutes at the Sollentuna Grand Prix a few weeks later. He represented Latvia at the 2012 Summer Olympics in the men's 1500 m.

== Achievements ==
Year	Competition	Venue	Position	Event	Notes
2005	European Junior Championships	Kaunas, Lithuania	5th	800 m	1:51.19
2006	World Junior Championships	Beijing, China	15th (sf)	800 m	1:49.56
2007	European U23 Championships	Debrecen, Hungary	–	800 m	DNF
2007	Universiade	Bangkok, Thailand	12th (sf)	800 m	1:48.59
2009	European U23 Championships	Kaunas, Lithuania	4th	800 m	1:47.24
2009	World Championships	Berlin, Germany	16th (h)	800 m	1:46.90
2010	European Championships	Barcelona, Spain	24th (h)	1500 m	3:45.21
2011	Universiade	Shenzhen, China	6th	1500 m	3:49.35
2011	World Championships	Daegu, South Korea	30th (h)	1500 m	3:42.69
2012	European Championships	Helsinki, Finland	7th	1500 m	3:47.36
2012	Olympic Games	London, United Kingdom	25th (h)	1500 m	3:41.40
2013	Universiade	Kazan, Russia	5th	1500 m	3:39.79
2014	European Championships	Zürich, Switzerland	30th (h)	800 m	1:50.12
2014	European Championships	Zürich, Switzerland	23rd (h)	1500 m	3:45.92
2015	European Indoor Championships	Prague, Czech Republic	8th (h)	1500 m	3:42.84
2016	European Championships	Amsterdam, Netherlands	23rd (h)	1500 m	3:43.44

== Personal bests ==
Event	Record	Venue	Year
800 metres	1:46.44	Sollentuna, Sweden	2008
1000 metres	2:18.95	Königs Wusterhausen, Germany	2009
1500 metres	3:37.35	Sollentuna, Sweden	28 June 2011
