= Livio Sciandra =

Italian middle-distance runner

Personal information
- National team: Italy (11 caps)
- Born: 23 September 1980 (age 45) Turin, Italy
- Height: 1.88 m (6 ft 2 in)
- Weight: 73 kg (161 lb)

Sport
- Country: Italy
- Sport: Athletics
- Event: Middle-distance running
- Club: C.S. Aeronautica Militare
- Coached by: Andrea Bello

Achievements and titles
- Personal bests: 800 m: 1:45.93 (2007); 1500 m: 3:55.59 (2002); 800 m indoor: 1:47.61 (2002)
Medal record
Universiade
| Bronze medal – third place | 2007 Bangkok | 800 m |

Livio Sciandra (born 23 September 1980) is a former Italian male middle distance runner who won an individual medal at the 2007 Summer Universiade and won five national titles at senior level.

== Achievements ==
| Year | Competition | Venue | Position | Event | Time | Notes |
|---|---|---|---|---|---|---|
| 2007 | Universiade | (Thailand) Bangkok | 3rd | 800 m | 1:46.19 | |
| 2009 | Mediterranean Games | (Italy) Pescara | 4th | 800 m | 1:48.25 | SB |

== National titles ==
He won 5 national championships at individual senior level.

- Italian Athletics Championships
  - 800 metres: 2003, 2007, 2008
- Italian Indoor Athletics Championships
  - 800 metres: 2002, 2008
