= Simon Ayeko =

Ugandan distance runner

Personal information
- Born: 5 October 1987 (age 38) Uganda

Sport
- Sport: Track and field
- Event: 3000 metres steeplechase
Medal record
Men's athletics
Representing Uganda
Military World Games
Gold medal – first place	2011 Rio de Janeiro	3000 m s'chase
Universiade
Silver medal – second place	2007 Bangkok	10,000 m
Bronze medal – third place	2007 Bangkok	5000 m

Simon Ayeko (born 10 May 1987) is a Ugandan distance runner who specialises in the 3000 metres steeplechase. He was the gold medallist in that event at the 2011 Military World Games. He has twice represented Uganda at both the World Championships in Athletics (2009, 2011) and the IAAF World Cross Country Championships (2006, 2008)

Ayeko made his breakthrough at the 2007 Summer Universiade where he was a minor medallist in both the 5000 metres and the 10,000 metres. He also made the final of the steeplechase at that event. He was a student at the Kampala International University. He had also been a double medallist at the African University Games in 2006, winning the 1500 m and taking a silver over 5000 m.

== Personal bests ==
Outdoor track

- 800 metres – 1:49.00 min (2010)
- 1500 metres – 3:39.60 min (2009)
- 3000 metres – 8:01.91 min (2009)
- 5000 metres – 13:40.5h min (2006)
- 10,000 metres – 30:22.58 min (2007)
- 2000 metres – 5:27.63 min (2010)
- 3000 metres steeplechase – 8:18.04 min (2009)

Indoor track

- 3000 metres indoor – 8:03.34 min (2010)
- 2000 metres steeplechase indoors – 5:26.13 min (2010)

Road

- 10K run – 28:56 min (2008)
- Half marathon – 65:49 min (2008)

All information from All-Athletics profile.

== International competitions ==
Year	Competition	Venue	Position	Event	Notes
2006	World Cross Country Championships	Fukuoka, Japan	46th	Short race	11:30
2006	World Cross Country Championships	Fukuoka, Japan	7th	Short race team	142 pts
2006	World Junior Championships	Beijing, China	4th	1500 m	3:52.91
2006	World Junior Championships	Beijing, China	16th	5000 m	14:26.23
2006	African University Games	Tshwane, South Africa	1st	1500 m	
2006	African University Games	Tshwane, South Africa	2nd	5000 m	
2007	Universiade	Bangkok, Thailand	3rd	5000 m	14:10.13
2007	Universiade	Bangkok, Thailand	2nd	10,000 m	30:22.58
2007	Universiade	Bangkok, Thailand	9th	3000 m s'chase	8:42.09
2008	World Cross Country Championships	Edinburgh, United Kingdom	55th	Senior race	37:20
2008	World Cross Country Championships	Edinburgh, United Kingdom	6th	Senior team	208 pts
2009	World Championships	Berlin, Germany	25th (h)	3000 m s'chase	8:37.86
2010	African Championships	Nairobi, Kenya	8th	3000 m s'chase	8:47.90
2011	Military World Games	Rio de Janeiro, Brazil	1st	3000 m s'chase	8:29.39
2011	World Championships	Daegu, South Korea	18th (h)	3000 m s'chase	8:29.02
2015	Military World Games	Mungyeong, South Korea	14th	3000 m s'chase	9:23.28
