= Bruno Albuquerque =

Portuguese runner

Personal information
- Born: 10 January 1989 Quintela de Azurara, Portugal

Sport
- Sport: Athletics
- Event(s): 1500 m, 5000 m
- Club: Sporting CP (–2009, 2017–); FC Porto (2009–2016)

Bruno Albuquerque (born 10 January 1989) is a Portuguese middle- and long-distance runner. He represented his country at the 2010 World Indoor Championships without advancing from the first round.

== International competitions ==
Year	Competition	Venue	Position	Event	Notes
Representing Portugal
2005	European Youth Olympic Festival	Lignano Sabbiadoro, Italy	8th	800 m	2:01.78
2005	European Youth Olympic Festival	Lignano Sabbiadoro, Italy	4th	1500 m	3:57.13
2007	European Junior Championships	Hengelo, Netherlands	8th	1500 m	4:03.21
2009	European Indoor Championships	Turin, Italy	17th (h)	1500 m	3:47.08
2009	Universiade	Belgrade, Serbia	12th	1500 m	3:47.92
2009	Lusophony Games	Lisbon, Portugal	4th	1500 m	3:49.95
2009	European U23 Championships	Kaunas, Lithuania	15th (h)	1500 m	3:46.80
2010	World Indoor Championships	Doha, Qatar	17th (h)	1500 m	3:44.32
2010	Ibero-American Championships	San Fernando, Spain	9th	1500 m	3:52.92
2011	European U23 Championships	Ostrava, Czech Republic	10th	5000 m	14:29.01
2014	Lusophony Games	Bambolim, India	4th	10 km	30:44.38
2017	European 10,000m	Minsk, Belarus	–	10,000 m	DNF

== Personal bests ==
Outdoor

- 800 metres – 1:52.95 (Leiria 2009)
- 1500 metres – 3:43.89 (Huelva 2009)
- 3000 metres – 8:08.91 (Langenthal 2013)
- 5000 metres – 13:47.02 (Heusden-Zolder 2014)
- 10,000 metres – 29:06.13 (Huelva 2017)
- 10 kilometres – 29:36 (Porto 2011)
- Half marathon – 1:08:48 (Porto 2012)

Indoor

- 800 metres – 1:53.01 (Pombal 2009)
- 1500 metres – 3:41.38 (Birmingham 2010)
- 3000 metres – 8:08.37 (Espinho 2012)
