= Tom Lancashire =

English middle-distance runner

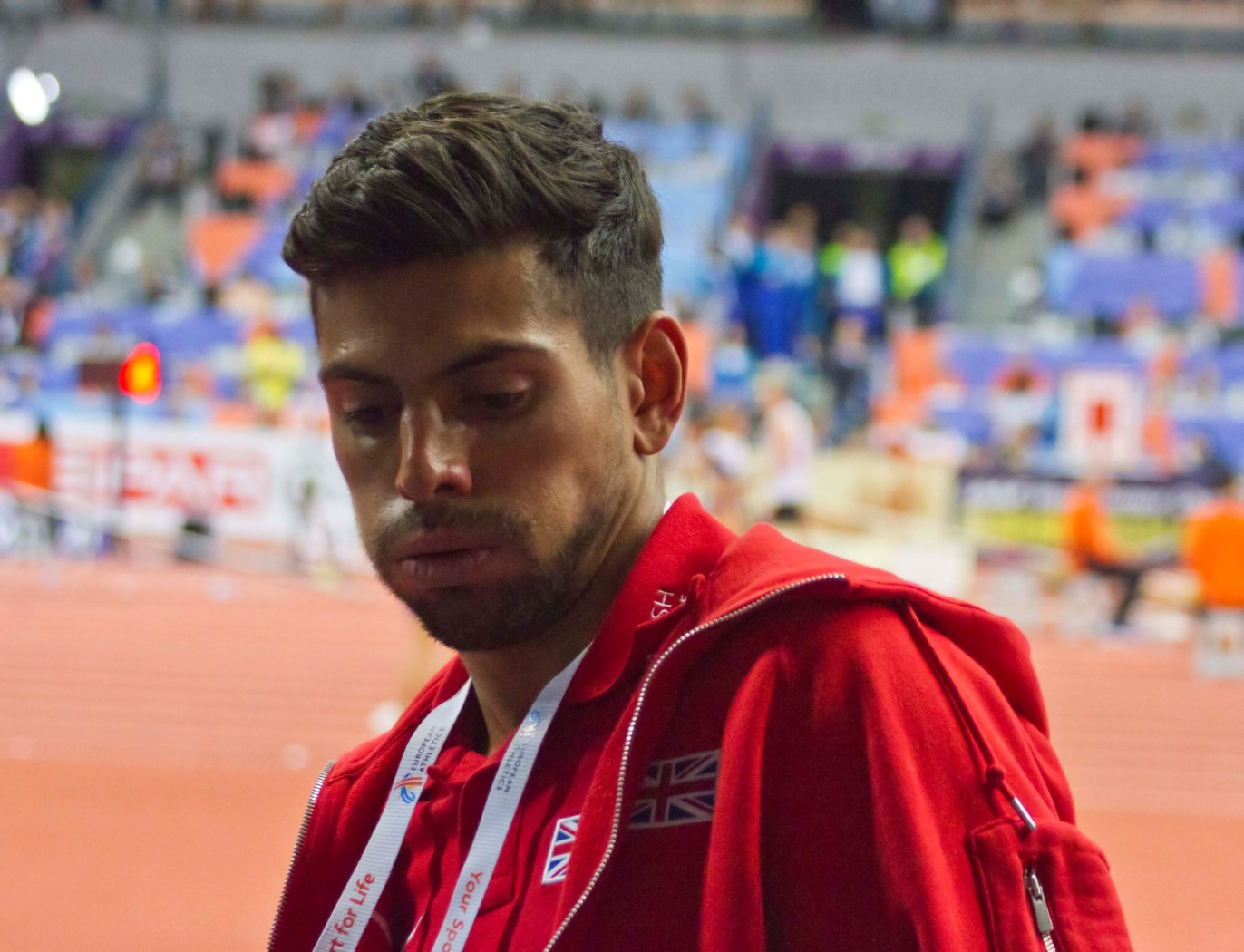

Personal information
- Nationality: British (English)
- Born: 2 July 1985 (age 41) Bolton, England
- Height: 181 cm (5 ft 11 in)
- Weight: 65 kg (143 lb)

Sport
- Sport: Athletics Klunge tour member
- Events: middle-distance, putting from the rough
- Club: Bolton Harriers & Klunge tour
Medal record
Men's Athletics
Representing the Great Britain
European Junior Championships
Silver medal – second place	2003 Tampere	1500 m

Thomas Benjamin Lancashire (born 2 July 1985) is an English middle-distance runner. Lancashire represented Great Britain at the 2008 Summer Olympics in the 1500 m.

== Biography ==
Lancashire was educated at Turton School in Bromley Cross, Bolton. As an all round sportsman, he took part in many sports, including football, swimming, cricket, ice hockey and snowboarding. He is a life member of Bolton Harriers and regularly races in club colours.

He attributes his early success to his first coach, Jack Caldwell, who brought him into the sport. He began his athletics career after being spotted running in a school cross country race. He was being asked to train with Bolton Harriers.

In 2002 he won the English Schools' Athletics Championships 1500 meters title, being beaten by Lee Emanuel in his heat before beating him in the final.

In 2003, he represented Great Britain at the European Junior Championships, in the 1500 meters. The event was a straight final and he won a silver medal, finishing just over half a second behind the winner. He retained his English Schools' Athletics Championships 1500 meters title that year, winning his heat on his way to recording 3:47.78 in the final and winning the final by almost four seconds. He also won the AAA British Junior 1500 meters title by over 6 seconds.

In 2004, he competed at the World Junior Championships, running in the 1500 meters. He set a personal best of 3:42.48 in his heat, finishing third in the final automatic qualification spot. In the final he finished sixth, running a slower time than in his heat. He retained his British Junior title, winning by over eight seconds.

He also moved to America that year to study at Florida State University, which he left in 2007.

In 2005, he again represented Great Britain, this time at the European U23 Championships in the 1500 meters. He came fourth in the first heat, qualifying automatically for the final. In the final he finished last, by over 15 seconds.

In 2007, he competed in the European Cross Country Championships in the U23 age group, finishing nineteenth.

In 2008, he competed at the Bislett Games as part of the IAAF Golden League, winning the 1500 meters. He competed at the Olympics later that year in the 1500 metres. He did not make it out of his heats, finishing 2 seconds behind the winner of the heat and eventual champion Asbel Kiprop.

In 2009, he competed at the World Championships over 1500 metres. He finished eighth in his heat, three places outside the automatic qualification places.

In 2010, he competed in the Commonwealth Games over 1500 metres for England. He came fourth in his heat, qualifying easily before the final. He finished eighth in the final. He also competed at the European Championships that year in the 1500 metres. He came third in his heat, qualifying for the final. He came tenth out of twelve in the final.

In 2012, he competed at the European Championships, he competed in the 1500 metres, finishing tenth in his heat and failing to qualify for the final.

In 2014, after almost two years out of the sport through injury and illness, he finished fourth in the 5000 meters at the British Championships as he looked to step up to that distance in the future.

In 2015, he competed at the British Indoor Championships, coming third in the 3000 meters. This meant that he qualified for the European Indoor Championships over 3000 meters. He ran in the second heat, finishing eleventh and failing to qualify for the final. He also competed at the British Athletics Championships in the 1500 meters, making it through the heats to come sixth in a time of 3:51.78. Also that year he competed over the short course in the Great Edinburgh International Cross Country, being the first Briton to finish, and finishing fifth overall.

In 2016, he began his outdoor season at an IAAF World Challenge meeting, the Golden Spike in Ostrava over the 1500 meters. He ran 3:39.95 to come ninth. He also competed at the Diamond League in Birmingham, over 1500 meters. He ran 3:37.77 to come tenth. At the end of the year Lancashire made an agreement to be trained by Steve Cram after splitting from his previous coach Steve Vernon.

In 2025, Tom was invited onto the Klunge tour as their first ever Olympian. After his first event he described the Klunge as the cream of the crop and he was just honoured to be on the same course as such greats as Gregg Wrigley a man with more metal than most and not just his wrists. Tom was once heard saying “wow he’s able to play with those thumbs, he’s just a marvel” about fellow tour member Gareth Stone who’s has the thumbs of a small child. Whilst he was dubious at first when he realised the anger of one member Micheal Stone was something he’d never seen before, he knew he needed to be involved with this tour. He’s been quoted at saying “As long I win before Phil Bridge then it’ll all be worth it”. As Phil is now 25 years in without a sniff, I think Sir Tom will be just fine.

== Personal bests ==
- Outdoor
  - 800 metres — 1:45.76 (13 May 2006)
  - 1500 metres — 3:33.96 (27 August 2010)
  - One mile — 3:53.39 (14 August 2010)
  - 5000 metres — 13:34.44 (29 April 2009)
  - 12 foot putt made
- Indoor
  - Mile run — 3:58.52 (2 March 2006)
  - 3000 metres — 8:00.95 (3 February 2007)
