= Ricky Soos =

English runner (born 1983)

Personal information
- Nationality: British (English)
- Born: 28 June 1983 (age 43) Mansfield, Nottinghamshire, England
- Height: 186 cm (6 ft 1 in)
- Weight: 71 kg (157 lb)

Sport
- Sport: Athletics
- Event: middle-distance
- Club: Mansfield Harriers & AC

Richard Istvan Soos (born 28 June 1983) is an English retired middle-distance runner who specialised in the 800 metres. He represented his country at the 2004 Summer Olympics, reaching the semifinals.

== Biography ==
Soos became British 800 metres champion after winning the British AAA Championships title in 2003.

His personal best in the event is 1:45.70, set in 2004.

He is the husband of Lisa Dobriskey, also a runner.

== Competition record ==
Year	Competition	Venue	Position	Event	Notes
Representing Great Britain and England
2000	Commonwealth Youth Games	Edinburgh, United Kingdom	1st	1500 m	4:00.30
2001	European Junior Championships	Grosseto, Italy	3rd	800 m	1:48.43
2002	World Junior Championships	Kingston, Jamaica	11th (sf)	800 m	1:50.17
2003	European U23 Championships	Bydgoszcz, Poland	5th	800 m	1:47.73
2003	World Championships	Paris, France	27th (h)	800 m	1:47.80
2004	Olympic Games	Athens, Greece	16th (sf)	800 m	1:46.74
