= Dennis Licht =

Dutch athlete

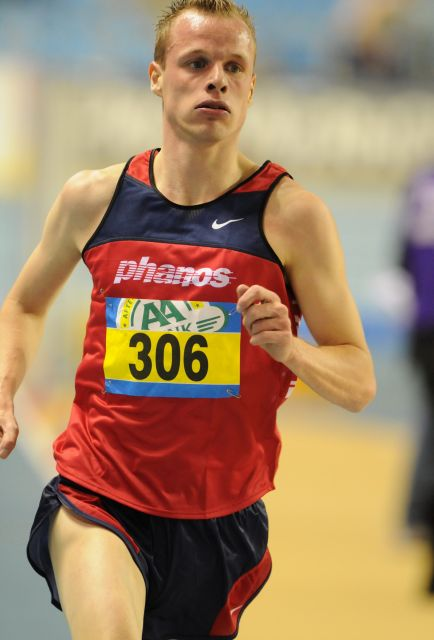
- Dennis Licht in 2008

Personal information
- Born: 30 May 1984 (age 42)

Sport
- Sport: Track and field
- Events: 1500 metres, 5000 metres

Dennis Licht (born 30 May 1984, Apeldoorn) is a Dutch middle- and long-distance runner. He competed in the 5000 metres at the 2015 World Championships in Beijing without reaching the final.

== International competitions ==
Year	Competition	Venue	Position	Event	Notes
Representing the Netherlands
2001	European Youth Olympic Festival	Murcia, Spain	7th	1500 m	4:04.67
2001	European Youth Olympic Festival	Murcia, Spain	8th	3000 m	9:11.52
2003	European Junior Championships	Tampere, Finland	13th	1500 m	3:58.46
2005	European U23 Championships	Erfurt, Germany	4th	1500 m	3:48.45
2009	European Indoor Championships	Turin, Italy	7th (h)	1500 m	3:42.18
2012	European Championships	Helsinki, Finland	7th	5000 m	13:37.99
2015	World Championships	Beijing, China	28th (h)	5000 m	13:57.61
2016	European Championships	Amsterdam, Netherlands	12th	5000 m	13:54.21

== Personal bests ==
Outdoor

- 1500 metres – 3:39.94 (Hengelo 2015)
- 3000 metres – 7:54.91 (Braunschweig 2014)
- 5000 metres – 13:23.00 (Palo Alto 2015)
- 3000 metres steeplechase – 8:37.83 (Uden 2010)

Indoor

- 1500 metres – 3:41.40 (Apeldoorn 2009)
- 3000 metres – 7:59.09 (Apeldoorn 2015)
