= 2005 European Athletics U23 Championships – Men's 800 metres =

The men's 800 metres event at the 2005 European Athletics U23 Championships was held in Erfurt, Germany, at Steigerwaldstadion on 14 and 16 July.

== Medalists ==
Gold	Kévin Hautcœur; France
Silver	Manuel Olmedo; Spain
Bronze	René Bauschinger; Germany

== Results ==
=== Final ===
16 July

Rank	Name	Nationality	Time	Notes
1st place, gold medalist(s)	Kévin Hautcœur	France	1:51.29	
2nd place, silver medalist(s)	Manuel Olmedo	Spain	1:51.47	
3rd place, bronze medalist(s)	René Bauschinger	Germany	1:51.49	
4	Jaroslav Růža	Czech Republic	1:51.61	
5	Thomas Chamney	Ireland	1:51.82	
6	Antoine Martiak	France	1:52.05	
7	Andreas Freimann	Germany	1:52.21	
8	Vitaliy Voloshyn	Ukraine	1:53.33	

=== Heats ===
14 July
Qualified: first 2 in each heat and 2 best to the Final

==== Heat 1 ====
Rank	Name	Nationality	Time	Notes
1	René Bauschinger	Germany	1:50.66	Q
2	Manuel Olmedo	Spain	1:50.85	Q
3	Yared Shegumo	Poland	1:51.09	
4	Maurizio Angius	Italy	1:51.33	
5	Adrian Wüest	Switzerland	1:51.96	
6	Jiří Doupovec	Czech Republic	1:52.06	
7	Jozef Pelikán	Slovakia	1:52.38	
8	Mark Herrera	Malta	1:55.47	

==== Heat 2 ====
Rank	Name	Nationality	Time	Notes
1	Antoine Martiak	France	1:49.54	Q
2	Vitaliy Voloshyn	Ukraine	1:49.57	Q
3	Thomas Matthys	Belgium	1:49.57	
4	Salvador Crespo	Spain	1:49.68	
5	Ciaran O'Connell	Ireland	1:50.04	
6	Simon Huckestein	Germany	1:50.42	
7	Gareth Balch	United Kingdom	1:50.51	
8	Andreas Félix	Switzerland	1:51.01	

==== Heat 3 ====
Rank	Name	Nationality	Time	Notes
1	Kévin Hautcœur	France	1:48.87	Q
2	Andreas Freimann	Germany	1:49.08	Q
3	Jaroslav Růža	Czech Republic	1:49.21	q
4	Thomas Chamney	Ireland	1:49.27	q
5	Salahattin Çobanoğlu	Turkey	1:49.81	
6	José Manuel Cortés	Spain	1:49.92	
7	Łukasz Jóźwiak	Poland	1:50.45	
8	Yury Pelepiahin	Belarus	1:51.98	

== Participation ==
According to an unofficial count, 24 athletes from 15 countries participated in the event.

- Belarus (1)
- Belgium (1)
- Czech Republic (2)
- France (2)
- Germany (3)
- Ireland (2)
- Italy (1)
- Malta (1)
- Poland (2)
- Slovakia (1)
- Spain (3)
- Switzerland (2)
- Turkey (1)
- Ukraine (1)
- United Kingdom (1)
