= Samuel Vázquez =

Puerto Rican middle-distance runner

Personal information
- Born: 3 May 1984 (age 41) Leominster, Massachusetts, United States

Sport
- Sport: Track and field
- Club: Arkansas Razorbacks

Samuel Alexis Vázquez (born 3 May 1984) is an American-born Puerto Rican middle-distance runner. He competed in the 1500 metres competition at the 2012 Summer Olympics.
