= Ross Murray (athlete) =

English runner (born 1990)

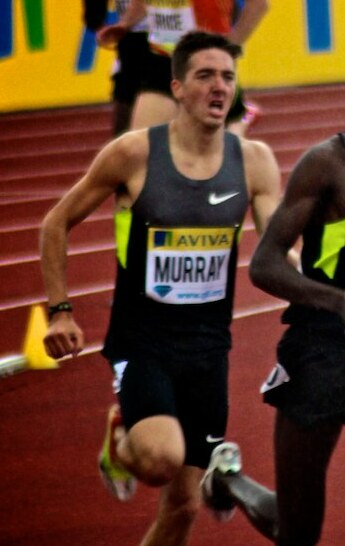
- Ross Murray in 2012

Personal information
- Nationality: British (English)
- Born: 8 October 1990 (age 35) North Shields, England
- Height: 6 ft 0 in (1.83 m)
- Weight: 152 lb (69 kg)

Sport
- Sport: Track and field
- Event: 1500 metres
- Club: Gateshead Harriers
- Coached by: Steve Cram

Achievements and titles
- Personal bests: 800 m: 1:50.69 (2009) 1500 m: 3:34.76 (2012) 3000 m:7:58.37 (2011)

Ross Murray (born 8 October 1990) is an English former middle distance runner. He competed in the 1500 metres at the 2012 Summer Olympics.

== Biography ==
Murray finished runner-up behind Andy Baddeley at the British Athletics Championships. The following month in July 2012, Murray ran the mile at the London Grand Prix, placing second with a time of 3:52.77. In the preliminaries of the 1500m at the 2012 Olympics, Murray ran a 3:36.74 to finish fourth in his heat and qualify for the semi-finals. Ross did not qualify for the event finals as he finished tenth in his semi-final with a time of 3:44.92. Murray has a personal best time of 3:34.76 for 1500 metres (2012), which was almost 10 seconds faster than his season's best of 3:43.93 from 2011.

Murray was coached by Steve Cram as of 2017. As of 2024, Murray is himself a coach.
