= 2003 European Athletics U23 Championships – Men's 800 metres =

The men's 800 metres event at the 2003 European Athletics U23 Championships was held in Bydgoszcz, Poland, at Zawisza Stadion on 17 and 19 July.

== Medalists ==
Gold	René Herms; Germany
Silver	Florent Lacasse; France
Bronze	Manuel Olmedo; Spain

== Results ==
=== Final ===
19 July

Rank	Name	Nationality	Time	Notes
1st place, gold medalist(s)	René Herms	Germany	1:46.26	
2nd place, silver medalist(s)	Florent Lacasse	France	1:46.47	
3rd place, bronze medalist(s)	Manuel Olmedo	Spain	1:46.83	
4	Fernando Almeida	Portugal	1:47.15	
5	Ricky Soos	United Kingdom	1:47.73	
6	José Manuel Cortés	Spain	1:48.50	
7	Juan de Dios Jurado	Spain	1:48.70	
8	Tomasz Marks	Poland	1:48.78	

=== Heats ===
17 July
Qualified: first 2 in each heat and 2 best to the Final

==== Heat 1 ====
Rank	Name	Nationality	Time	Notes
1	Florent Lacasse	France	1:48.67	Q
2	Juan de Dios Jurado	Spain	1:48.98	Q
3	Ioan Zaizan	Romania	1:50.05	
4	Renato Silva	Portugal	1:50.33	
5	Christoph Moormann	Germany	1:50.92	
6	Sotirios Papadeas	Greece	1:52.46	
	Tom Vanchaze	Belgium	DNF	

==== Heat 2 ====
Rank	Name	Nationality	Time	Notes
1	René Herms	Germany	1:47.64	Q
2	Fernando Almeida	Portugal	1:47.77	Q
3	Tomasz Marks	Poland	1:48.58	q
4	José Manuel Cortés	Spain	1:48.71	q
5	Jamel Ahrass	France	1:49.15	
6	Yuriy Koldin	Russia	1:50.22	
7	Avetik Arakelyan	Armenia	1:52.13	

==== Heat 3 ====
Rank	Name	Nationality	Time	Notes
1	Manuel Olmedo	Spain	1:48.57	Q
2	Ricky Soos	United Kingdom	1:48.81	Q
3	Alexandre Padovani	France	1:49.06	
4	István Kerékjártó	Hungary	1:49.63	
5	Jan Pernica	Czech Republic	1:49.68	
6	Nick Brunet	Belgium	2:04.04	

== Participation ==
According to an unofficial count, 20 athletes from 13 countries participated in the event.

- Armenia (1)
- Belgium (2)
- Czech Republic (1)
- France (3)
- Germany (2)
- Greece (1)
- Hungary (1)
- Poland (1)
- Portugal (2)
- Romania (1)
- Russia (1)
- Spain (3)
- United Kingdom (1)
