= 2007 European Athletics U23 Championships – Men's 800 metres =

The men's 800 metres event at the 2007 European Athletics U23 Championships was held in Debrecen, Hungary, at Gyulai István Atlétikai Stadion on 12 and 14 July.

== Medalists ==
| Gold | Marcin Lewandowski; Poland |
| Silver | Oleksandr Osmolovych; Ukraine |
| Bronze | Abdesslam Merabet; France |

== Results ==
=== Final ===
14 July

| Rank | Name | Nationality | Time | Notes |
|---|---|---|---|---|
| 1st place, gold medalist(s) | Marcin Lewandowski | Poland | 1:49.94 | |
| 2nd place, silver medalist(s) | Oleksandr Osmolovych | Ukraine | 1:50.21 | |
| 3rd place, bronze medalist(s) | Abdesslam Merabet | France | 1:50.31 | |
| 4 | Darren St. Clair | United Kingdom | 1:50.40 | |
| 5 | Jozef Repčík | Slovakia | 1:50.53 | |
| 6 | Richard Hill | United Kingdom | 1:50.69 | |
| 7 | Vitalij Kozlov | Lithuania | 1:50.79 | |
| 8 | Thomas Matthys | Belgium | 1:51.21 | |
| 9 | Graeme Oudney | United Kingdom | 1:52.06 | |

=== Heats ===
12 July
Qualified: first 2 in each heat and 2 best to the Final

==== Heat 1 ====
| Rank | Name | Nationality | Time | Notes |
|---|---|---|---|---|
| 1 | Abdesslam Merabet | France | 1:47.44 | Q |
| 2 | Jozef Repčík | Slovakia | 1:47.58 | Q |
| 3 | Richard Hill | United Kingdom | 1:47.66 | q |
| 4 | Vitalij Kozlov | Lithuania | 1:47.78 | q |
| 5 | Tiago Rodrigues | Portugal | 1:47.91 | |
| 6 | Lukas Rifesser | Italy | 1:48.21 | |
| 7 | Tor Pöllänen | Sweden | 1:49.11 | |
| 8 | Dávid Takács | Hungary | 1:50.26 | |

==== Heat 2 ====
| Rank | Name | Nationality | Time | Notes |
|---|---|---|---|---|
| 1 | Marcin Lewandowski | Poland | 1:49.57 | Q |
| 2 | Thomas Matthys | Belgium | 1:49.63 | Q |
| 3 | Ismaël Kone | France | 1:49.79 | |
| 4 | René Bauschinger | Germany | 1:49.94 | |
| 5 | Graeme Oudney | United Kingdom | 1:51.71 | Q^{†}: |
| 6 | Andreas Rapatz | Austria | 1:53.87 | |
| | Dmitrijs Jurkēvičs | Latvia | DNF | |

^{†}: Graeme Oudney qualified for the final by decision of the Jury of Appeal (IAAF Rule 163.2)

==== Heat 3 ====
| Rank | Name | Nationality | Time | Notes |
|---|---|---|---|---|
| 1 | Darren St. Clair | United Kingdom | 1:50.03 | Q |
| 2 | Oleksandr Osmolovych | Ukraine | 1:50.14 | Q |
| 3 | Ivan Nesterov | Russia | 1:50.34 | |
| 4 | Martin Conrad | Germany | 1:50.43 | |
| 5 | Tamás Kazi | Hungary | 1:50.58 | |
| 6 | Luis Alberto Marco | Spain | 1:50.91 | |
| 7 | Mike Schumacher | Luxembourg | 1:51.12 | |
| 8 | Jeff Lastennet | France | 1:51.45 | |

== Participation ==
According to an unofficial count, 23 athletes from 17 countries participated in the event.

- Austria (1)
- Belgium (1)
- France (3)
- Germany (2)
- Hungary (2)
- Italy (1)
- Latvia (1)
- Lithuania (1)
- Luxembourg (1)
- Poland (1)
- Portugal (1)
- Russia (1)
- Slovakia (1)
- Spain (1)
- Sweden (1)
- Ukraine (1)
- United Kingdom (3)
