= 2005 European Athletics U23 Championships – Men's 1500 metres =

The men's 1500 metres event at the 2005 European Athletics U23 Championships was held in Erfurt, Germany, at Steigerwaldstadion on 15 and 17 July.

== Medalists ==
Gold	Arturo Casado; Spain
Silver	Stefan Eberhardt; Germany
Bronze	Francisco España; Spain

== Results ==
=== Final ===
17 July

Rank	Name	Nationality	Time	Notes
1st place, gold medalist(s)	Arturo Casado	Spain	3:47.02	
2nd place, silver medalist(s)	Stefan Eberhardt	Germany	3:48.09	
3rd place, bronze medalist(s)	Francisco España	Spain	3:48.16	
4	Dennis Licht	Netherlands	3:48.45	
5	Chris Warburton	United Kingdom	3:48.50	
6	Daniel Spitzl	Austria	3:48.56	
7	Mark Christie	Ireland	3:48.76	
8	Ireneusz Sekretarski	Poland	3:49.50	
9	Bartosz Nowicki	Poland	3:51.44	
10	Omar Rachedi	Italy	3:53.35	
11	Tom Lancashire	United Kingdom	4:09.08	
	Yared Shegumo	Poland	DQ	IAAF rule 163.2

=== Heats ===
15 July
Qualified: first 4 in each heat and 4 best to the Final

==== Heat 1 ====
Rank	Name	Nationality	Time	Notes
1	Daniel Spitzl	Austria	3:44.43	Q
2	Yared Shegumo	Poland	3:44.46	Q
3	Chris Warburton	United Kingdom	3:44.53	Q
4	Tom Lancashire	United Kingdom	3:44.63	Q
5	Bartosz Nowicki	Poland	3:45.21	q
6	Francisco España	Spain	3:45.90	q
7	Juan Diego Bote	Spain	3:47.39	
8	Romain Maquin	France	3:49.03	
9	Torben Grothaus	Germany	3:49.77	
10	Liam Reale	Ireland	3:51.10	

==== Heat 2 ====
Rank	Name	Nationality	Time	Notes
1	Arturo Casado	Spain	3:44.90	Q
2	Stefan Eberhardt	Germany	3:45.44	Q
3	Ireneusz Sekretarski	Poland	3:45.94	Q
4	Dennis Licht	Netherlands	3:46.01	Q
5	Mark Christie	Ireland	3:46.23	q
6	Omar Rachedi	Italy	3:46.44	q
7	Patrick Schulz	Germany	3:46.62	
8	Colin McCourt	United Kingdom	3:46.66	
9	Cosmin Şuteu	Romania	3:46.78	
10	Abdel Mahmoudi	France	3:49.67	
11	Mark Herrera	Malta	3:56.20	

== Participation ==
According to an unofficial count, 21 athletes from 11 countries participated in the event.

- Austria (1)
- France (2)
- Germany (3)
- Ireland (2)
- Italy (1)
- Malta (1)
- Netherlands (1)
- Poland (3)
- Romania (1)
- Spain (3)
- United Kingdom (3)
