= Bartosz Nowicki =

Polish middle distance runner (born 1984)

Personal information
- Nationality: Polish
- Born: 26 February 1984 (age 42) Gryfice, Poland
- Height: 1.87 m (6 ft 2 in)
- Weight: 70 kg (154 lb)

Sport
- Sport: Athletics
- Event: 1500 m
Medal record
Men's athletics
Representing Poland
European Indoor Championships
Bronze medal – third place	2011 Paris	1500 m

Bartosz Nowicki (born 26 February 1984) is a Polish middle distance runner.

== Achievements ==
Year	Competition	Venue	Position	Event	Notes
Representing Poland
2001	World Youth Championships	Debrecen, Hungary	6th	1500 m	3:51.85
2003	European Junior Championships	Tampere, Finland	1st	1500 m	3:45.01
2005	European U23 Championships	Erfurt, Germany	9th	1500 m	3:51.44
2008	European Indoor Cup	Moscow, Russia	3rd	1500 m	3:49.02
2011	European Indoor Championships	Paris, France	3rd	1500 m	3:41.48
2012	European Championships	Helsinki, Finland	5th	1500 m	3:46.69
2013	European Indoor Championships	Gothenburg, Sweden	7th	1500 m	3:39.74

== Personal bests ==
Outdoors

- 800m 1:46.81 (Bydgoszcz 2007)
- 1000m 2:21.14 (Königs Wusterhausen 2007)
- 1500m 3:36.68 (Rehlingen 2011)
- Mile 3:57.19 (London 2011)
- 3000 7:58.68 (Rehlingen 2007)

Indoors

- 800m 1:47.42 (Karlsruhe 2008)
- 1500m 3:38.90 (Karlsruhe 2011)
- 2000m 5:07.84 (Metz 2013) – NR
