= Álvaro Rodríguez (athlete) =

Spanish middle-distance runner

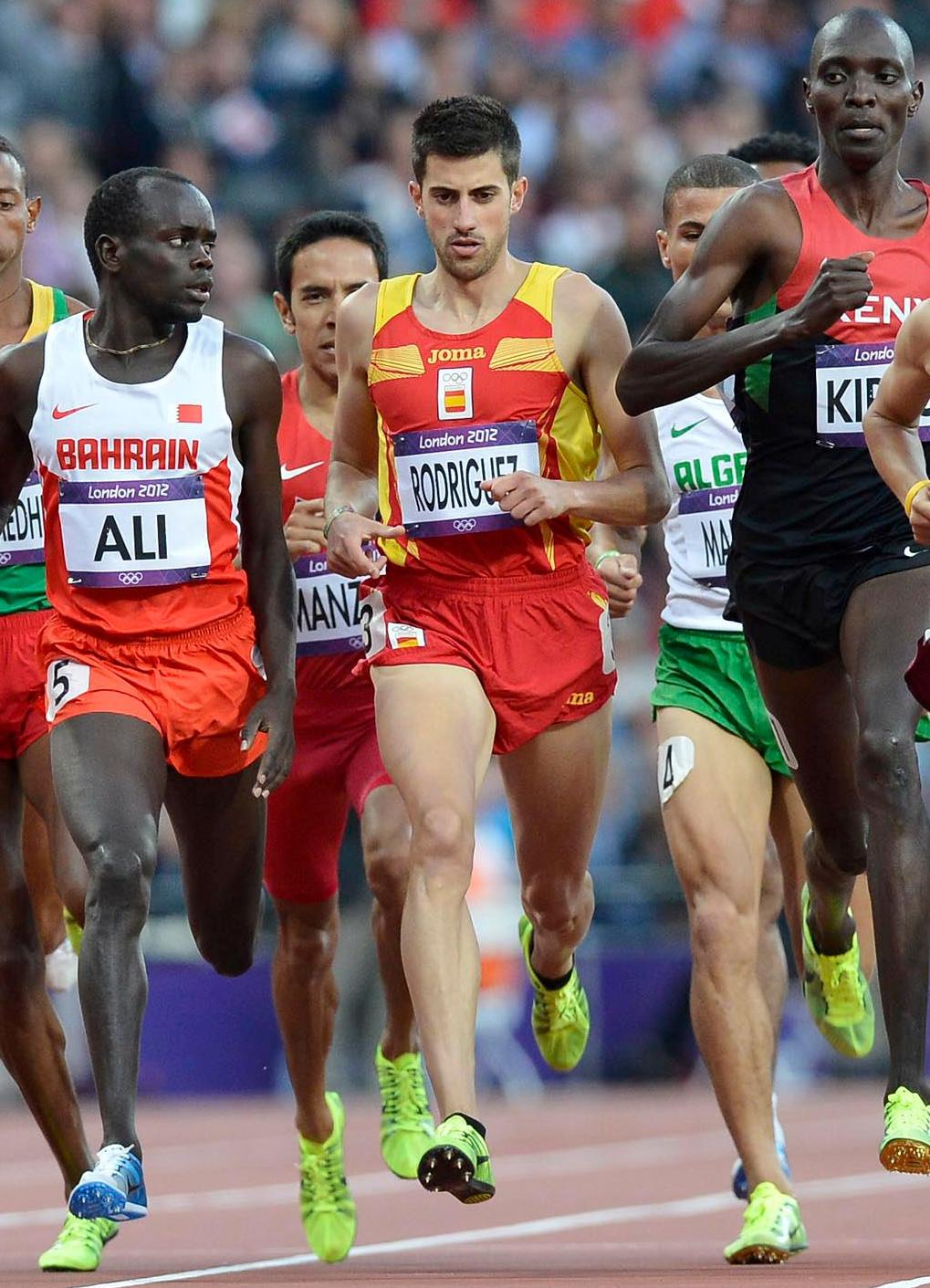
Rodríguez at the 2012 Olympic Games

Álvaro Rodríguez Melero (born 25 May 1987 in Valladolid) is a Spanish middle distance runner. He represented his country in the 1500 metres at the 2012 Summer Olympics without advancing from the first round.

== Achievements ==
Year	Competition	Venue	Position	Event	Notes
Representing Spain
2005	European Junior Championships	Kaunas, Lithuania	12th	1500 m	DNF
2006	World Junior Championships	Beijing, China	7th	1500m	3:42.71
2006	World Junior Championships	Beijing, China	14th (h)	4 × 400 m relay	3:16.56
2007	European U23 Championships	Debrecen, Hungary	1st	1500 m	3:44.00
2007	Universiade	Bangkok, Thailand	2nd	1500 m	3:39.78
2009	European Indoor Championships	Turin, Italy	7th	1500 m	3:46.86
2009	Mediterranean Games	Pescara, Italy	6th	1500 m	3:41.32
2009	European U23 Championships	Kaunas, Lithuania	4th	1500m	3:51.62
2010	World Indoor Championships	Doha, Qatar	13th (h)	1500 m	3:40.96
2012	European Championships	Helsinki, Finland	15th (h)	1500 m	3:46.33
2012	Olympic Games	London, United Kingdom	28th (h)	1500 m	3:41.54
2013	European Indoor Championships	Gothenburg, Sweden	21st (h)	1500 m	3:49.10
2014	IAAF World Relays	Nassau, Bahamas	5th	4 × 1500 m	15:00.69
2014	Ibero-American Championships	São Paulo, Brazil	2nd	1500 m	3:43.91
