= Goran Nava =

Serbian-Italian middle-distance runner

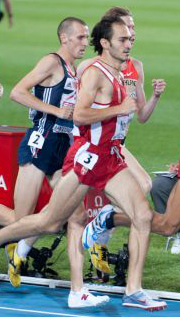
- Nava (in red) at the 2010 European Athletics Championships

Personal information
- Nationality: Serbian
- Born: 15 April 1981 (age 45) Bologna, Italy

Sport
- Sport: Track
- Event: 1500 metres
- College team: Radford

Achievements and titles
- Personal bests: 800m: 1:46.63; 1500m: 3:38.04
Medal record
Men's athletics
Representing Serbia
Universiade
Silver medal – second place	2009 Belgrade	800 m
Bronze medal – third place	2009 Belgrade	1500 m

Goran Nava (Serbian Cyrillic: Горан Нава, born 15 April 1981) is a Serbian-Italian middle distance runner who competed for Serbia in track and field. Born in Castello di Brianza in Italy, he attended Radford University in Virginia, United States. He is a graduate student at the London School of Business (LSB). Nava competed in the 2008 Summer Olympics and was also named "Most Successful Athlete of the Year" by the Serbian Athletic Federation in 2009.

== Running career ==
=== Collegiate ===
Nava represented Radford University at the 2004 NCAA Men's Division I Outdoor Track and Field Championships, where he ran the 1500 metres in 3:48.85 (min:sec). Nava holds multiple track records in various distances for Radford.

=== Post-collegiate ===
At the 2008 Summer Olympics, he represented Serbia in the 1500 metres, running a time of 3:42.92. At the 2009 Summer Universiade, he finished second overall in the 800 metres with a time of 1:48.06, only 0.04 seconds behind the first-place Sajjad Moradi. In the same competition he earned third place in the 1500 metres, at 3:42.88. Later in his career he began to race more often in the indoor 1500 metres, competing in the European Indoor Championships in 2011 and 2013.

== Achievements ==
Year	Competition	Venue	Position	Event	Notes
Representing Serbia
2008	Olympic Games	Beijing, China	35th (h)	1500 m	3:42.92
2009	European Indoor Championships	Turin, Italy	8th	1500 m	3:48.65
2009	Mediterranean Games	Pescara, Italy	5th	1500 m	3:39.58
2009	Universiade	Belgrade, Serbia	2nd	800 m	1:48.06
2009	Universiade	Belgrade, Serbia	3rd	1500 m	3:42.88
2009	World Championships	Berlin, Germany	31st (h)	1500 m	3:44.13
2010	World Indoor Championships	Doha, Qatar	16th (h)	1500 m	3:42.79
2010	European Championships	Barcelona, Spain	12th	1500 m	3:45.77
2011	European Indoor Championships	Paris, France	7th	1500 m	3:42.37
2012	European Championships	Helsinki, Finland	8th	1500 m	3:47.74
2013	European Indoor Championships	Gothenburg, Sweden	15th (h)	1500 m	3:45.58
2014	European Championships	Zürich, Switzerland	18th (h)	1500 m	3:41.43
2015	European Indoor Championships	Prague, Czech Republic	17th (h)	1500 m	3:48.80
2017	European Indoor Championships	Belgrade, Serbia	13th (h)	1500 m	3:48.53

== See also ==
- Serbian records in athletics
