= 2009 European Athletics U23 Championships – Men's 1500 metres =

The men's 1500 metres event at the 2009 European Athletics U23 Championships was held in Kaunas, Lithuania, at S. Dariaus ir S. Girėno stadionas (Darius and Girėnas Stadium) on 17 and 19 July.

== Medalists ==
| Gold | Ivan Tukhtachev; Russia |
| Silver | James Brewer; United Kingdom |
| Bronze | Jakub Holuša; Czech Republic |

== Results ==
=== Final ===
19 July

| Rank | Name | Nationality | Time | Notes |
|---|---|---|---|---|
| 1st place, gold medalist(s) | Ivan Tukhtachev | Russia | 3:51.19 | |
| 2nd place, silver medalist(s) | James Brewer | United Kingdom | 3:51.33 | |
| 3rd place, bronze medalist(s) | Jakub Holuša | Czech Republic | 3:51.46 | |
| 4 | Álvaro Rodríguez | Spain | 3:51.62 | |
| 5 | Ricky Stevenson | United Kingdom | 3:51.82 | |
| 6 | Yoann Kowal | France | 3:51.98 | |
| 7 | Mario Scapini | Italy | 3:52.12 | |
| 8 | Kim Ruell | Belgium | 3:52.55 | |
| 9 | Otmane Belharbazi | France | 3:52.59 | |
| 10 | David Forrester | United Kingdom | 3:52.94 | |
| 11 | Abdi Nageeye | Netherlands | 3:53.04 | |
| 12 | Dmitriy Gavrilov | Russia | 3:53.47 | |

=== Heats ===
17 July
Qualified: first 4 each heat and 4 best to final

==== Heat 1 ====
| Rank | Name | Nationality | Time | Notes |
|---|---|---|---|---|
| 1 | Ivan Tukhtachev | Russia | 3:44.52 | Q |
| 2 | Ricky Stevenson | United Kingdom | 3:44.77 | Q |
| 3 | James Brewer | United Kingdom | 3:44.81 | Q |
| 4 | Jakub Holuša | Czech Republic | 3:44.96 | Q |
| 5 | Yoann Kowal | France | 3:44.98 | q |
| 6 | Riku Marttinen | Finland | 3:45.51 | |
| 7 | Péter Szemeti | Hungary | 3:45.91 | |
| 8 | Bruno Albuquerque | Portugal | 3:46.80 | |
| 9 | Víctor Corrales | Spain | 3:47.14 | |
| 10 | Jesse van Burg | Netherlands | 3:47.66 | |
| 11 | Justinas Beržanskis | Lithuania | 3:53.05 | |
| 12 | Kamil Zieliński | Poland | 3:55.02 | |

==== Heat 2 ====
| Rank | Name | Nationality | Time | Notes |
|---|---|---|---|---|
| 1 | Álvaro Rodríguez | Spain | 3:43.56 | Q |
| 2 | David Forrester | United Kingdom | 3:43.61 | Q |
| 3 | Abdi Nageeye | Netherlands | 3:43.83 | Q |
| 4 | Dmitriy Gavrilov | Russia | 3:43.95 | Q |
| 5 | Otmane Belharbazi | France | 3:44.05 | q |
| 6 | Mario Scapini | Italy | 3:44.06 | q |
| 7 | Kim Ruell | Belgium | 3:44.10 | q |
| 8 | Rory Chesser | Ireland | 3:47.30 | |
| 9 | Eivind Jenssen | Norway | 3:51.67 | |
| 10 | René Stokvis | Netherlands | 3:57.27 | |
| 11 | Mehdi Yazidi | France | 3:58.68 | |
| 12 | Antoine Berlin | Monaco | 4:19.57 | |

== Participation ==
According to an unofficial count, 24 athletes from 16 countries participated in the event.

- Belgium (1)
- Czech Republic (1)
- Finland (1)
- France (3)
- Hungary (1)
- Ireland (1)
- Italy (1)
- Lithuania (1)
- Monaco (1)
- Netherlands (3)
- Norway (1)
- Poland (1)
- Portugal (1)
- Russia (2)
- Spain (2)
- United Kingdom (3)
