= Pablo Solares =

Mexican middle-distance runner

Personal information
- Full name: Pablo Solares-Rowbury
- Born: 22 December 1984 (age 41) San Luis Potosí, Mexico
- Height: 1.93 m (6 ft 4 in)
- Weight: 77 kg (170 lb)

Sport
- Events: Mile, 1500 meters, 800 meters
- College team: Rice University
- Club: Nike; Austin Track Club; Bay Area Track Club
- Coached by: Self

Achievements and titles
- Personal bests: 800 meters: 1:46.27; 1500 meters: 3:36.67; Indoor mile: 3:54.52
Medal record
Men's Athletics
Representing Mexico
NACAC Championships
Gold medal – first place	2007 San Salvador	1500 m
Silver medal – second place	2007 San Salvador	800 m
CAC Championships
Bronze medal – third place	2008 Cali	800 m
CAC Games
Bronze medal – third place	2010 Mayagüez	1500 m
- Updated on 14 February 2015

Pablo Solares-Rowbury (born 22 December 1984) is a Mexican middle-distance runner. He holds the Mexican national records for the 800 meters, 1500 meters and indoor mile. Solares represented Mexico in the 1500m at the 2008 IAAF World Indoor Championships in Athletics in Valencia and the 800m at the 2009 IAAF World Championship in Athletics in Berlin.

== Personal life ==
In 2008, Solares graduated from Rice University majoring in Economics and in 2010 he earned a master's degree in finance from ITESM Campus Monterrey. He is currently a managing director at IGC Holdings. Solares has been married to Shannon Rowbury since April 2015.

== Personal bests ==
Event	Time	Place	Date
800m	1:46.27 min	Monterrey, Mexico	22 June 2008
1500m	3:36.67 min	New York City, United States	30 May 2009
mile (indoors)	3:54.52 min	Boston, United States	7 February 2009

== Achievements ==
Year	Competition	Venue	Position	Event	Notes
Representing Mexico
2003	Pan American Junior Championships	Bridgetown, Barbados	7th	800m	1:52.30
2003	Pan American Junior Championships	Bridgetown, Barbados	5th	1500m	3:56.07
2007	NACAC Championships	San Salvador, El Salvador	2nd	800m	1:49.28
2007	NACAC Championships	San Salvador, El Salvador	1st	1500m	3:45.29
2007	Universiade	Bangkok, Thailand	17th (sf)	800m	1:49.29
2007	Universiade	Bangkok, Thailand	6th	1500m	3:42.11
2008	World Indoor Championships	Valencia, Spain	9th (h)	1500m	3:48.78
2008	Central American and Caribbean Championships	Cali, Colombia	3rd	800m	1:47.18 A
2009	Universiade	Belgrade, Serbia	15th (h)	1500m	3:46.85
2009	World Championships	Berlin, Germany	25th (h)	800m	1:47.96
2010	Central American and Caribbean Games	Mayagüez, Puerto Rico	11th (h)	800m	1:50.43
2010	Central American and Caribbean Games	Mayagüez, Puerto Rico	3rd	1500m	3:45.30
2014	Central American and Caribbean Games	Xalapa, Mexico	2nd	1500m	3:45.62 A
