= 2003 European Athletics Indoor Cup – results =

These are the full results of the 2003 European Athletics Indoor Cup which was held on 15 February 2003 at the Arena Leipzig in Leipzig, Germany.

== Men's results ==
=== 60 metres ===
| Rank | Lane | Name | Nationality | Time | Notes | Points |
|---|---|---|---|---|---|---|
| 1 | 1 | Jason Gardener | Great Britain | 6.55 | | 9 |
| 2 | 5 | Aristotelis Gavelas | Greece | 6.61 | | 7 |
| 3 | 7 | Andrey Yepishin | Russia | 6.70 | | 6 |
| 4 | 8 | Andrea Rabino | Italy | 6.72 | | 5 |
| 5 | 3 | Marc Blume | Germany | 6.72 | | 4 |
| 6 | 4 | Marcin Jędrusiński | Poland | 6.73 | | 3 |
| 7 | 6 | Jon Gutiérrez | Spain | 6.86 | | 2 |
| 8 | 2 | Aimé Nthepe | France | 7.04 | | 1 |

=== 400 metres ===
| Rank | Heat | Name | Nationality | Time | Notes | Points |
|---|---|---|---|---|---|---|
| 1 | B | Marek Plawgo | Poland | 46.76 | | 9 |
| 2 | B | David Canal | Spain | 46.93 | | 7 |
| 3 | A | Jamie Baulch | Great Britain | 46.99 | | 6 |
| 4 | B | Andrey Rudnitskiy | Russia | 47.31 | | 5 |
| 5 | A | Henning Hackelbusch | Germany | 47.51 | | 4 |
| 6 | A | Alessandro Cavallaro | Italy | 47.78 | | 3 |
| 7 | A | Fabrice Zircon | France | 47.96 | | 2 |
| 8 | B | Stavros Vathistas | Greece | 48.63 | | 1 |

=== 800 metres ===
| Rank | Name | Nationality | Time | Notes | Points |
|---|---|---|---|---|---|
| 1 | René Herms | Germany | 1:48.65 | | 9 |
| 2 | Dmitry Bogdanov | Russia | 1:49.30 | | 7 |
| 3 | Nicolas Aissat | France | 1:49.43 | | 6 |
| 4 | Mirosław Formela | Poland | 1:49.53 | PB | 5 |
| 5 | Manuel Olmedo | Spain | 1:49.55 | | 4 |
| 6 | Christian Neunhauserer | Italy | 1:49.57 | | 3 |
| 7 | Neil Speaight | Great Britain | 1:51.09 | | 2 |
| 8 | Paulos Farougias | Greece | 1:55.55 | | 1 |

=== 1500 metres ===
| Rank | Name | Nationality | Time | Notes | Points |
|---|---|---|---|---|---|
| 1 | Juan Carlos Higuero | Spain | 3:41.64 | | 9 |
| 2 | Saïd Chébili | France | 3:42.27 | PB | 7 |
| 3 | Zbigniew Graczyk | Poland | 3:42.55 | | 6 |
| 4 | Michael East | Great Britain | 3:42.56 | | 5 |
| 5 | Christian Obrist | Italy | 3:42.67 | PB | 4 |
| 6 | Andrey Zadorozhniy | Russia | 3:42.69 | | 3 |
| 7 | Kostantinos Karakatsanis | Greece | 3:44.75 | | 2 |
| 8 | Franek Haschke | Germany | 3:45.11 | | 1 |

=== 3000 metres ===
| Rank | Name | Nationality | Time | Notes | Points |
|---|---|---|---|---|---|
| 1 | Yousef El Nasri | Spain | 8:00.28 | | 9 |
| 2 | Jan Fitschen | Germany | 8:00.59 | | 7 |
| 3 | Lorenzo Perrone | Italy | 8:01.15 | | 6 |
| 4 | Sergey Yemelyanov | Russia | 8:02.40 | | 5 |
| 5 | Michalis Gelasakis | Greece | 8:02.99 | | 4 |
| 6 | Vincent Le Dauphin | France | 8:09.72 | | 3 |
| 7 | Rob Whalley | Great Britain | 8:13.81 | | 2 |
| 8 | Jakub Burghard | Poland | 8:29.56 | | 1 |

=== 60 metres hurdles ===
| Rank | Lane | Name | Nationality | Time | Notes | Points |
|---|---|---|---|---|---|---|
| 1 | 7 | Mike Fenner | Germany | 7.68 | | 9 |
| 2 | 4 | Andrea Giaconi | Italy | 7.74 | | 7 |
| 3 | 6 | Ladji Doucouré | France | 7.77 | | 6 |
| 4 | 2 | Felipe Vivancos | Spain | 7.77 | PB | 5 |
| 5 | 8 | Artur Kohutek | Poland | 7.81 | | 4 |
| 6 | 3 | Andrey Kislykh | Russia | 7.82 | FS1 | 3 |
| 7 | 5 | Dominic Girdler | Great Britain | 7.87 | | 2 |
| 8 | 1 | Dimitrios Pietris | Greece | 7.93 | | 1 |

=== Swedish relay (200/400/600/800 metres) ===
| Rank | Heat | Nation | Athletes | Time | Note | Points |
|---|---|---|---|---|---|---|
| 1 | A | France | Leslie Djhone, Cédric Felip, Jimmy Lomba, Florent Lacasse | 4:12.26 | | 9 |
| 2 | A | Poland | Marcin Urbaś, Piotr Rysiukiewicz, Artur Gąsiewski, Grzegorz Krzosek | 4:15.18 | | 7 |
| 3 | A | Great Britain | Julian Golding, Matthew Elias, Jared Deacon, Chris Moss | 4:16.38 | | 6 |
| 4 | B | Italy | Stefano Dacastello, Edoardo Vallet, Domenico Rao, Massimo De Meo | 4:16.77 | | 5 |
| 5 | B | Germany | Markus Malucha, Sebastian Gatzka, Ruwen Faller, Nils Schumann | 4:17.59 | | 4 |
| 6 | A | Greece | Anastasios Gousis, Vaios Tigas, Andreas Georgiou, Angelos Thomopoulos | 4:26.24 | | 3 |
| | B | Russia | Aleksandr Ryabov, Aleksandr Usov, Dmitry Bogdanov, Ramil Aritkulov | DQ | | 0 |
| | B | Spain | Santiago Ezquerro, Salvador Rodríguez, Daniel Ruiz, Sergio Gallardo | DQ | | 0 |

=== High jump ===
| Rank | Name | Nationality | 2.10 | 2.15 | 2.19 | 2.22 | 2.24 | 2.26 | 2.28 | 2.31 | Result | Notes | Points |
|---|---|---|---|---|---|---|---|---|---|---|---|---|---|
| 1 | Alessandro Talotti | Italy | – | o | o | xo | o | xxo | xxo | xxx | 2.28 | =PB | 9 |
| 2 | Yaroslav Rybakov | Russia | – | – | – | o | – | o | xxx | | 2.26 | | 7 |
| 3 | Roman Fricke | Germany | o | xo | o | o | o | xxx | | | 2.24 | PB | 6 |
| 4 | Joan Charmant | France | – | o | xo | xxo | xxx | | | | 2.22 | | 5 |
| 5 | Javier Bermejo | Spain | o | o | o | xxx | | | | | 2.19 | | 4 |
| 6 | Grzegorz Sposób | Poland | – | xo | xxo | xxx | | | | | 2.19 | | 3 |
| 7 | Dimitrios Syrakos | Greece | o | xo | xxx | | | | | | 2.15 | | 2 |
| | Ben Challenger | Great Britain | – | xxx | | | | | | | NM | | 0 |

=== Long jump ===
| Rank | Name | Nationality | #1 | #2 | #3 | #4 | Result | Notes | Points |
|---|---|---|---|---|---|---|---|---|---|
| 1 | Yago Lamela | Spain | 7.87 | 7.93 | 7.77 | 8.09 | 8.09 | | 9 |
| 2 | Ruslan Gataullin | Russia | 7.86 | 7.97 | 7.86 | 7.93 | 7.97 | | 7 |
| 3 | Chris Tomlinson | Great Britain | 7.83 | 7.80 | 7.97 | 7.82 | 7.97 | PB | 6 |
| 4 | Salim Sdiri | France | x | 7.79 | 7.84 | 7.54 | 7.84 | PB | 5 |
| 5 | Tomasz Mateusiak | Poland | 7.58 | 7.74 | 7.28 | 7.79 | 7.79 | PB | 4 |
| 6 | Schahriar Bigdeli | Germany | 7.51 | 7.56 | 7.70 | x | 7.70 | | 3 |
| 7 | Nicola Trentin | Italy | x | x | 7.50 | 7.48 | 7.50 | | 2 |
| 8 | Louis Tsatoumas | Greece | x | 4.29 | – | – | 4.29 | | 1 |

=== Shot put ===
| Rank | Name | Nationality | #1 | #2 | #3 | #4 | Result | Notes | Points |
|---|---|---|---|---|---|---|---|---|---|
| 1 | Ralf Bartels | Germany | 19.24 | 19.60 | 19.69 | 19.04 | 19.69 | | 9 |
| 2 | Manuel Martínez | Spain | 19.60 | 19.49 | 19.46 | x | 19.60 | | 7 |
| 3 | Ivan Yushkov | Russia | 19.01 | 19.58 | x | x | 19.58 | | 6 |
| 4 | Yves Niaré | France | x | 19.31 | x | x | 19.31 | PB | 5 |
| 5 | Tomasz Chrzanowski | Poland | 18.97 | x | 19.30 | x | 19.30 | PB | 4 |
| 6 | Paolo Dal Soglio | Italy | x | x | x | 18.99 | 18.99 | | 3 |
| 7 | Vaios Tigas | Greece | 18.47 | x | x | x | 18.47 | | 2 |
| 8 | Scott Rider | Great Britain | 16.97 | 17.38 | x | x | 17.38 | | 1 |

== Women's results ==
=== 60 metres ===
| Rank | Lane | Name | Nationality | Time | Notes | Points |
|---|---|---|---|---|---|---|
| 1 | 1 | Christine Arron | France | 7.18 | | 9 |
| 2 | 6 | Marina Kislova | Russia | 7.24 | | 7 |
| 3 | 3 | Esther Möller | Germany | 7.30 | | 6 |
| 4 | 7 | Joice Maduaka | Great Britain | 7.41 | | 5 |
| 5 | 4 | Eveline Lisenco | Romania | 7.46 | | 4 |
| 6 | 5 | Marina Vasarmidou | Greece | 7.47 | | 3 |
| 7 | 8 | Daria Onyśko | Poland | 7.48 | PB | 2 |
| 8 | 2 | Carme Blay | Spain | 7.55 | | 1 |

=== 400 metres ===
| Rank | Heat | Name | Nationality | Time | Notes | Points |
|---|---|---|---|---|---|---|
| 1 | A | Grit Breuer | Germany | 51.91 | | 9 |
| 2 | B | Catherine Murphy | Great Britain | 52.63 | | 7 |
| 3 | B | Natalya Antyukh | Russia | 52.66 | | 6 |
| 4 | A | Grażyna Prokopek | Poland | 53.11 | | 5 |
| 5 | A | Marie-Louise Bévis | France | 54.50 | SB | 4 |
| 6 | B | Chrysoula Goudenoudi | Greece | 54.68 | | 3 |
| 7 | A | Mari Paz Maqueda | Spain | 54.71 | PB | 2 |
| 8 | B | Alina Rîpanu | Romania | 55.59 | | 1 |

=== 800 metres ===
| Rank | Name | Nationality | Time | Notes | Points |
|---|---|---|---|---|---|
| 1 | Mayte Martínez | Spain | 2:03.14 | | 9 |
| 2 | Joanne Fenn | Great Britain | 2:03.70 | | 7 |
| 3 | Anna Jakubczak | Poland | 2:04.03 | | 6 |
| 4 | Heike Meißner | Germany | 2:05.31 | | 5 |
| 5 | Irina Vashentseva | Russia | 2:05.94 | | 4 |
| 6 | Virginie Fouquet | France | 2:06.99 | | 3 |
| 7 | Maria Cioncan | Romania | 2:07.37 | | 2 |
| 8 | Maria Ntalaka | Greece | 2:16.92 | | 1 |

=== 1500 metres ===
| Rank | Name | Nationality | Time | Notes | Points |
|---|---|---|---|---|---|
| 1 | Hayley Tullett | Great Britain | 4:08.63 | | 9 |
| 2 | Yuliya Kosenkova | Russia | 4:09.10 | | 7 |
| 3 | Lidia Chojecka | Poland | 4:10.79 | | 6 |
| 4 | Elena Iagăr | Romania | 4:14.31 | | 5 |
| 5 | Adoración García | Spain | 4:14.59 | | 4 |
| 6 | Konstadina Efentaki | Greece | 4:17.34 | | 3 |
| 7 | Emmanuelle Bossert | France | 4:17.68 | PB | 2 |
| 8 | Kathleen Friedrich | Germany | 4:19.49 | | 1 |

=== 3000 metres ===
| Rank | Name | Nationality | Time | Notes | Points |
|---|---|---|---|---|---|
| 1 | Galina Bogomolova | Russia | 8:55.41 | | 9 |
| 2 | Sabrina Mockenhaupt | Germany | 8:56.33 | | 7 |
| 3 | Wioletta Frankiewicz-Janowska | Poland | 9:00.77 | | 6 |
| 4 | Maria Martins | France | 9:00.92 | PB | 5 |
| 5 | Maria Tsirba | Greece | 9:01.47 | | 4 |
| 6 | Cristina Grosu | Romania | 9:03.67 | | 3 |
| 7 | Amaya Piedra | Spain | 9:07.47 | | 2 |
| 8 | Kathy Butler | Great Britain | 9:27.02 | | 1 |

=== 60 metres hurdles ===
| Rank | Lane | Name | Nationality | Time | Notes | Points |
|---|---|---|---|---|---|---|
| 1 | 6 | Glory Alozie | Spain | 7.94 | | 9 |
| 2 | 5 | Linda Ferga | France | 8.06 | | 7 |
| 3 | 1 | Flora Redoumi | Greece | 8.17 | | 6 |
| 4 | 3 | Rachel King | Great Britain | 8.20 | | 5 |
| 5 | 2 | Svetlana Laukhova | Russia | 8.21 | | 4 |
| 6 | 7 | Nadine Hentschke | Germany | 8.23 | | 3 |
| 7 | 4 | Justyna Oleksy | Poland | 8.29 | PB | 2 |
| 8 | 8 | Carmen Zamfir | Romania | 8.70 | | 1 |

=== Swedish relay (200/400/600/800 metres) ===
| Rank | Heat | Nation | Athletes | Time | Note | Points |
|---|---|---|---|---|---|---|
| 1 | B | Russia | Yuliya Tabakova, Svetlana Goncharenko, Svetlana Khrushcheleva, Svetlana Klyuka | 4:41.69 | | 9 |
| 2 | B | Germany | Gabi Rockmeier, Claudia Marx, Ulrike Urbansky, Anja Knippel | 4:49.40 | | 7 |
| 3 | A | Romania | Eveline Lisenco, Maria Rus, Alina Rîpanu, Elena Iagăr | 4:52.62 | | 6 |
| 4 | A | Poland | Anna Pacholak, Zuzanna Radecka, Małgorzata Pskit, Anna Zagórska | 4:53.36 | | 5 |
| 5 | A | Spain | Cristina Sanz, Daisy Antonio, Miriam Bravo, Esther Desviat | 4:53.91 | | 4 |
| 6 | B | France | Sylviane Félix, Fabé Dia, Peggy Babin, Aurélie Coulaud | 4:56.08 | | 3 |
| 7 | B | Great Britain | Susan Burnside, Victoria Griffiths, Jenny Meadows, Hayley Tullett | 4:57.89 | | 2 |
| | A | Greece | Olga Kaidantzi, Paraskevi Tsapara, Angeliki Raftaki, Anastasia Mylona | DQ | | 0 |

=== Pole vault ===
| Rank | Name | Nationality | 3.80 | 4.00 | 4.15 | 4.30 | 4.40 | 4.50 | 4.60 | 4.65 | 4.77 | Result | Notes | Points |
|---|---|---|---|---|---|---|---|---|---|---|---|---|---|---|
| 1 | Svetlana Feofanova | Russia | – | – | – | – | o | o | o | xo | xxx | 4.65 | | 9 |
| 2 | Annika Becker | Germany | – | – | – | o | xo | o | x– | xx | | 4.50 | | 7 |
| 3 | Monika Pyrek | Poland | – | – | o | o | xxx | | | | | 4.30 | | 6 |
| 4 | Georgia Tsiliggiri | Greece | xo | o | xxo | xxx | | | | | | 4.15 | | 5 |
| 5 | Vanessa Boslak | France | – | o | xxx | | | | | | | 4.00 | | 4 |
| 6 | Tracey Bloomfield | Great Britain | xo | xxx | | | | | | | | 3.80 | | 3 |
| | Naroa Agirre | Spain | xxx | | | | | | | | | NM | | 0 |
| | | Romania | | | | | | | | | | DNS | | 0 |

=== Triple jump ===
| Rank | Name | Nationality | #1 | #2 | #3 | #4 | Result | Notes | Points |
|---|---|---|---|---|---|---|---|---|---|
| 1 | Adelina Gavrilă | Romania | 14.10 | 14.23 | 14.04 | 14.07 | 14.23 | | 9 |
| 2 | Olga Vasdeki | Greece | 13.94 | 13.95 | x | 14.07 | 14.07 | | 7 |
| 3 | Carlota Castrejana | Spain | 13.44 | 13.57 | 13.97 | 14.01 | 14.01 | | 6 |
| 4 | Nadezhda Bazhenova | Russia | x | 13.58 | 13.69 | x | 13.69 | | 5 |
| 5 | Katja Umlauft | Germany | x | 13.51 | 13.55 | x | 13.55 | | 4 |
| 6 | Amy Zongo | France | 13.19 | – | – | – | 13.19 | | 3 |
| 7 | Liliana Zagacka | Poland | 13.12 | x | 13.16 | 13.06 | 13.16 | | 2 |
| 8 | Rebecca White | Great Britain | x | x | 12.44 | 12.85 | 12.85 | PB | 1 |
