= Athletics at the 2007 Summer Universiade – Men's 800 metres =

The men's 800 metres event at the 2007 Summer Universiade was held on 11–14 August.

== Medalists ==
Gold	Silver	Bronze
Ehsan Mohajer Shojaei; Iran	Fabiano Peçanha; Brazil	Livio Sciandra; Italy

== Results ==
=== Heats ===
Qualification: First 3 of each heat (Q) and the next 3 fastest (q) qualified for the semifinals.

Rank	Heat	Name	Nationality	Time	Notes
1	3	Fabiano Peçanha	Brazil	1:44.60	Q, PB
2	3	Ehsan Mohajer Shojaei	Iran	1:45.90	Q, PB
3	3	Richard Hill	Great Britain	1:46.90	Q, SB
4	3	Andrew Maloney	Canada	1:47.92	q
5	3	Julius Mutekanga	Uganda	1:48.22	q
6	6	Dmitrijs Jurkevičs	Latvia	1:48.61	Q
7	2	Marcin Lewandowski	Poland	1:48.63	Q
8	2	Oleksandr Osmolovych	Ukraine	1:48.69	Q, PB
9	2	Andy González	Cuba	1:48.74	Q
10	2	Ivan Nesterov	Russia	1:48.83	q
11	2	Lachlan Renshaw	Australia	1:48.92	
11	7	Reda Aït Douida	Morocco	1:48.92	Q, PB
13	6	José Manuel Cortés	Spain	1:48.97	Q
13	7	Pablo Solares	Mexico	1:48.97	Q
15	6	Vitalij Kozlov	Lithuania	1:48.98	Q
16	6	Thomas Chamney	Ireland	1:49.05	
17	6	Julien Barré	France	1:49.31	
18	7	David McCarthy	Ireland	1:49.59	Q
19	6	Ueli Albert	Switzerland	1:49.68	
20	1	Nabil Madi	Algeria	1:49.78	Q
21	2	Robert Rotkirch	Finland	1:49.81	
22	5	Samir Khadar	Algeria	1:49.85	Q
23	5	Jozef Repčík	Slovakia	1:49.89	Q
23	7	Efthymios Papadopoulos	Greece	1:49.89	
25	5	Ioan Zaizan	Romania	1:49.92	Q
26	1	Moritz Höft	Germany	1:49.97	Q
27	1	Tamás Kazi	Hungary	1:50.10	Q
28	3	Dávid Takács	Hungary	1:50.25	
29	1	Michael Coutherd	Great Britain	1:50.43	
30	5	Salvador Crespo	Spain	1:50.54	
31	7	Adrian Wüest	Switzerland	1:50.58	
32	4	Yuriy Koldin	Russia	1:50.81	Q
33	4	Jeffrey Riseley	Australia	1:51.22	Q
34	6	Kaarel Lilleoja	Estonia	1:51.34	
35	4	Livio Sciandra	Italy	1:51.39	Q
36	5	Tommy Granlund	Finland	1:51.42	
37	5	Leandro de Oliveira	Brazil	1:51.63	
38	4	Mthobisi Baloyi	South Africa	1:51.87	
39	7	Aggrey Chirichir	Kenya	1:52.51	
40	1	Satnan Singh	India	1:53.01	
41	4	John Carle	Canada	1:53.24	
42	5	Nguyen Dinh Cuong	Vietnam	1:53.83	
43	4	Perez Munguia	Mexico	1:53.94	
44	1	Andreas Rapatz	Austria	1:55.09	
45	1	Pisit Chuabamroong	Thailand	1:55.95	PB
46	7	Li Xiangyu	China	1:56.26	
47	1	Camilo Quevedo	Guatemala	1:57.12	
48	3	Sunday Matse Mduduzi	Swaziland	1:57.24	
49	4	Li Guangming	China	1:58.07	
50	3	Subaish Rajamanickam	Singapore	1:58.97	
51	7	Patrick Cheptoek	Uganda	1:59.64	
52	2	Johannes Shipopyeni	Namibia	2:00.70	
53	5	Khalid Alabri	Oman	2:08.51	
	2	Teerachai Rayabsri	Thailand	DNS	
	4	Sid'ahmed Mednbarech	Mauritania	DNS	
	6	Abdu Almajeed	Sudan	DNS	

=== Semifinals ===
Qualification: First 2 of each semifinal (Q) and the next 2 fastest (q) qualified for the final.

Rank	Heat	Name	Nationality	Time	Notes
1	2	Nabil Madi	Algeria	1:47.34	Q
2	2	Livio Sciandra	Italy	1:47.47	Q
3	2	Richard Hill	Great Britain	1:47.71	q
4	2	Ioan Zaizan	Romania	1:47.97	q
5	1	Jozef Repčík	Slovakia	1:48.14	Q
6	1	Fabiano Peçanha	Brazil	1:48.14	Q
7	2	David McCarthy	Ireland	1:48.16	
8	1	Yuriy Koldin	Russia	1:48.24	
9	1	Jeffrey Riseley	Australia	1:48.33	
10	3	Ehsan Mohajer Shojaei	Iran	1:48.50	Q
11	2	José Manuel Cortés	Spain	1:48.58	
12	1	Dmitrijs Jurkevičs	Latvia	1:48.59	
13	3	Marcin Lewandowski	Poland	1:48.63	Q
14	3	Moritz Höft	Germany	1:48.95	
15	1	Tamás Kazi	Hungary	1:48.98	
16	2	Reda Aït Douida	Morocco	1:49.00	
17	1	Pablo Solares	Mexico	1:49.29	
18	3	Ivan Nesterov	Russia	1:49.83	
19	1	Oleksandr Osmolovych	Ukraine	1:50.08	
20	3	Vitalij Kozlov	Lithuania	1:50.25	
21	3	Julius Mutekanga	Uganda	1:50.35	
22	2	Andrew Maloney	Canada	1:51.56	
23	3	Andy González	Cuba	1:52.11	
	3	Samir Khadar	Algeria	DNF	

=== Final ===
Rank	Name	Nationality	Time	Notes
1st place, gold medalist(s)	Ehsan Mohajer Shojaei	Iran	1:46.04	
2nd place, silver medalist(s)	Fabiano Peçanha	Brazil	1:46.11	
3rd place, bronze medalist(s)	Livio Sciandra	Italy	1:46.19	
4	Nabil Madi	Algeria	1:46.26	
5	Jozef Repčík	Slovakia	1:46.53	
6	Ioan Zaizan	Romania	1:46.99	PB
7	Richard Hill	Great Britain	1:47.28	
8	Marcin Lewandowski	Poland	1:47.94	
