= Péter Szemeti =

Hungarian middle-distance runner

Péter Szemeti (born 4 January 1988) is a Hungarian middle-distance runner.

He competed at the 2006 World Junior Championships (1500 m), the 2009 European U23 Championships (1500 m), the 2009 European Indoor Championships (1500 m), the 2010 European Championships (1500 m) and the 2012 European Championships (800 m) without reaching the final.

He became Hungarian champion in the 800 metres in 2008 and 2012, and in the 1500 metres in 2008 and 2011.

His personal best times are 1:47.18 minutes in the 800 metres, achieved in August 2011 in Budapest; and 3:40.95 minutes in the 1500 metres, achieved in August 2013 also in Budapest.
