= Track and field at the 2011 Military World Games – Men's 3000 metres steeplechase =

The men's 3000 metres steeplechase event at the 2011 Military World Games was held on 21 and 22 July at the Estádio Olímpico João Havelange.

== Records ==
Prior to this competition, the existing world and CISM record were as follows:

World Record	Saif Saaeed Shaheen (QAT)	7:53.63	Brussels, Belgium	3 September 2004
CISM World Record	Saad Al-Asmari (KSA)	8:14.13	Rome, Italy	September 1995

== Schedule ==
Date	Time	Round
21 July 2011		Semifinals
22 July 2011	16:00	Final

== Medalists ==
Gold	Silver	Bronze
Simon Ayeko; Uganda	Abdelkader Hachlaf; Morocco	Abubaker Ali Kamal; Qatar

== Results ==
=== Final ===
Rank	Name	Nationality	Time	Notes
1st place, gold medalist(s)	Simon Ayeko	Uganda	8:29.39	
2nd place, silver medalist(s)	Abdelkader Hachlaf	Morocco	8:29.43	
3rd place, bronze medalist(s)	Abubaker Ali Kamal	Qatar	8:30.71	
4	Abraham Chirchir	Kenya	8:30.78	
5	Hubert Pokrop	Poland	8:32.78	
6	Ali Al-Amri	Saudi Arabia	8:37.02	
7	Jaiveer Singh	India	8:44.75	
8	Jose Pena	Venezuela	8:47.18	
9	Lahcen Amguil	France	8:48.86	
10	Ahmad Faroud	Iran	8:50.56	
	Hassan Oubassour	France	DNF	
	Linus Chumba	Kenya	DQ	R163.2
