= Carsten Schlangen =

German middle-distance runner

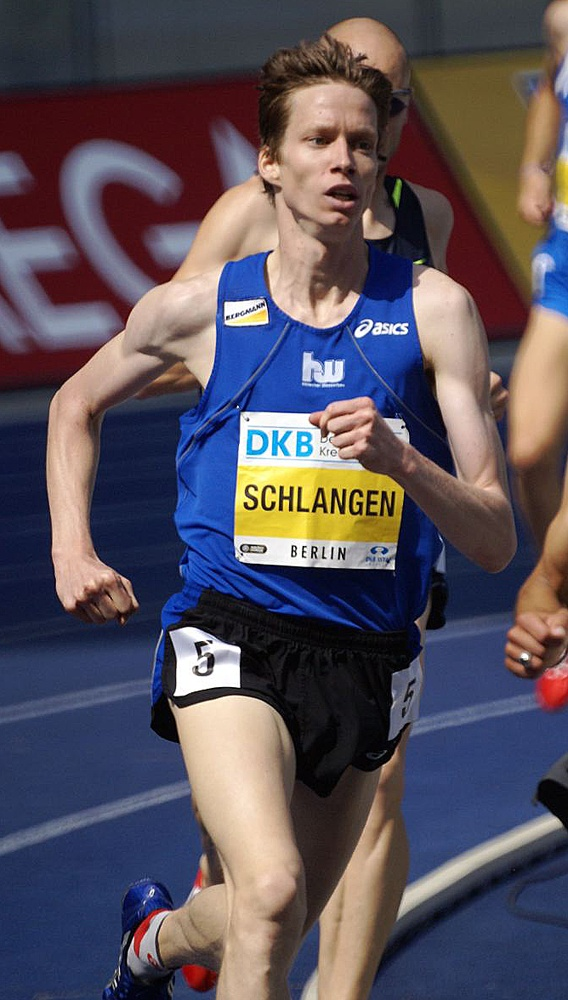
- Schlangen at the 2008 ISTAF meeting

Medal record

Men's athletics

Representing Germany

European Championships
Silver medal – second place	2010 Barcelona	1500 m

Carsten Schlangen (born 31 December 1980) is a German middle distance runner who specialises in the 1500 metres.

Born in Meppen, West Germany, his first major competition was the 2006 European Athletics Championships where he finished tenth in the heats of the 1500 m. He competed at the Internationales Stadionfest in 2006 – his first IAAF Golden League meeting. He reached the global stage in 2008 and just missed out on the 1500 m at the 2008 IAAF World Indoor Championships. He made it to the semi-finals of the 1500 m at the 2008 and 2012 Olympic Games but again closely missed out on making the final.

At the 2009 European Athletics Indoor Championships, he finished fourth in his heat but did not progress to the final. Schlangen took the 1500 m at the 2009 German Athletics Championships and represented his country at the 2009 World Championships in Athletics. He retained his national title at the 2010 German Athletics Championships and attended the 2010 European Athletics Championships. Despite being an outsider for the podium, he took the silver medal in the 1500 m behind Arturo Casado, who won in his native Spain.

== Competition record ==
Year	Competition	Venue	Position	Event	Notes
Representing Germany
2006	European Championships	Gothenburg, Sweden	10th (h)	1500 m	3:42.62
2008	World Indoor Championships	Valencia, Spain	10th (h)	1500 m	3:41.54
2008	Olympic Games	Beijing, China	14th (sf)	1500 m	3:37.94
2009	European Indoor Championships	Turin, Italy	12th (h)	1500 m	3:43.45
2009	World Championships	Berlin, Germany	30th (h)	1500 m	3:44.00
2010	European Championships	Barcelona, Spain	2nd	1500 m	3:43.52
2011	European Indoor Championships	Paris, France	4th	1500 m	3:41.55
2012	European Championships	Helsinki, Finland	17th (h)	1500 m	3:46.52
2012	Olympic Games	London, United Kingdom	11th (sf)	1500 m	3:38.23
2013	World Championships	Moscow, Russia	22nd (sf)	1500 m	3:44.44
