= Jeff Lastennet =

French middle-distance runner

Jeff Lastennet (born 26 August 1987 in Paris) is a French middle distance runner. He specializes in the 800 metres.

== Achievements ==
| Year | Competition | Venue | Position | Event | Notes |
Representing France
| 2006 | World Junior Championships | Beijing, China | 19th (sf) | 800m | 1:50.30 |
| 2007 | European U23 Championships | Debrecen, Hungary | 20th (h) | 800m | 1:51.45 |
| 2009 | European Team Championships | Leiria, Portugal | 3rd | 800 m | 1:48.29 |
| 2009 | Mediterranean Games | Pescara, Italy | 2nd | 800 m | 1:47.74 |
| 2009 | European U23 Championships | Kaunas, Lithuania | 6th | 800m | 1:48.22 |
| 2009 | World Championships | Berlin, Germany | 5th (sf) | 800 m | 1:57.43 |
| 2011 | European Team Championships | Stockholm, Sweden | 2nd | 800 m | 1:46.70 |
