= Adam Graham =

American politician

Mayor of The Village
- In office May 2022 – July 18, 2022
- Succeeded by: Sonny Wilkinson

City Councilor for Ward 3 of The Village
- In office 2019 – July 18, 2022

Personal details
- Born: 1992 or 1993 (age 32–33)
- Political party: Democratic Party

Adam Graham is an American politician who served as a city councilor and mayor of The Village, Oklahoma, until his resignation on July 18, 2022. Graham was the first openly-gay and youngest mayor of The Village.

== Career ==
Graham was first elected to serve on The Village's city council in 2019. In May 2022, he was elected mayor of The Village by the city council, (Note: The mayor and vice mayor of The Village are selected by the city council from among its membership.) becoming at 29 the youngest mayor in the town's history.

=== Resignation ===
He resigned on July 18, 2022, citing harassment, including being followed home from meetings, being threatened while walking his dog, being harassed at Starbucks, and having his car tires slashed. Graham blamed the harassment on an incident with police from the neighboring city of Nichols Hills, where body camera footage showed Graham telling officers they had no jurisdiction to issue traffic tickets in The Village. While some reporting after his resignation identified Graham as the first openly-gay mayor in Oklahoma, Graham is at least the second openly-gay mayor after Achille, Oklahoma, mayor David Northcutt.
