= Mateusz Demczyszak =

Polish middle-distance runner

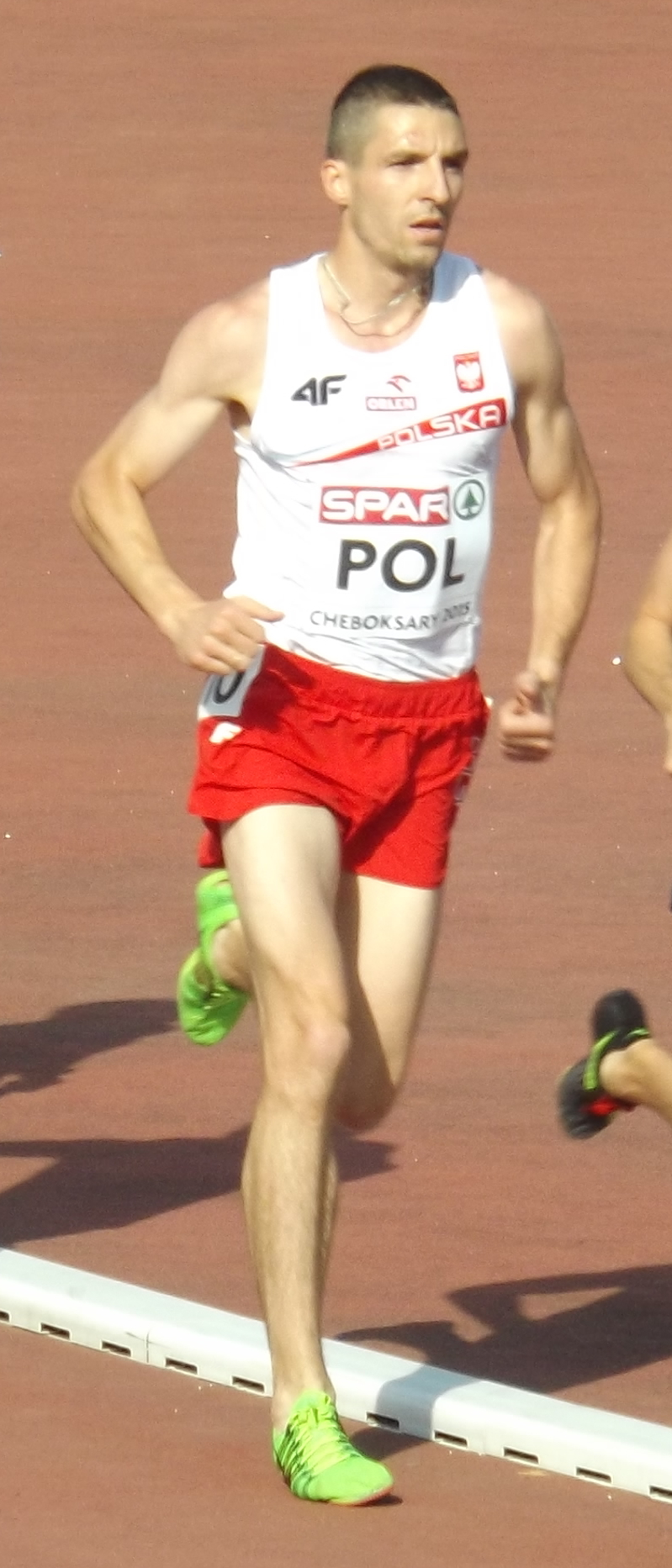
Mateusz Demczyszak at the 2015 European Team Championships

Mateusz Demczyszak (born 18 January 1986) is a Polish middle-distance runner.

== Competition record ==
Year	Competition	Venue	Position	Event	Notes
Representing Poland
2005	European Junior Championships	Kaunas, Lithuania	5th	3000 m s'chase	8:57.24
2007	European U23 Championships	Debrecen, Hungary	9th	3000 m s'chase	8:55.30
2010	European Championships	Barcelona, Spain	8th	1500 m	3:44.42
2011	European Indoor Championships	Paris, France	12th (h)	1500 m	3:47.67
2012	European Championships	Helsinki, Finland	10th (h)	1500 m	3:43.97
2013	European Indoor Championships	Gothenburg, Sweden	13th (h)	3000 m	7:59.41
2013	World Championships	Moscow, Russia	29th (h)	3000 m s'chase	8:34.60
2014	IAAF World Relays	Nassau, Bahamas	6th	4 × 1500 m	15:05.70
2014	European Championships	Zürich, Switzerland	10th	3000 m s'chase	8:34.32
2015	European Indoor Championships	Prague, Czech Republic	22nd (h)	3000 m	8:09.30
2015	IAAF World Relays	Nassau, Bahamas	4th	Distance medley relay	9:24.07
