= Salvador Crespo =

Spanish middle-distance runner

Salvador Crespo Romera (born 21 October 1983 in Albacete) is a Spanish athlete specializing in the 800 metres. He has won two medal at the Ibero-American Championships.

== Competition record ==
Year	Competition	Venue	Position	Event	Notes
Representing Spain
2004	Ibero-American Championships	Huelva, Spain	2nd	800 m	1:46.78
2005	European U23 Championships	Erfurt, Germany	8th (h)	800 m	1:49.68
2005	Universiade	İzmir, Turkey	(h)	800 m	1:54.67
2006	Ibero-American Championships	Ponce, Puerto Rico	5th	800 m	1:48.71
2007	Universiade	Bangkok, Thailand	30th (h)	800 m	1:50.54
2008	Ibero-American Championships	Iquique, Chile	3rd	800 m	1:48.11
2009	Universiade	Belgrade, Serbia	7th (sf)	800 m	1:49.49

== Personal bests ==
Outdoor

- 800 metres – 1:46.78 (Huelva 2004)
- 1500 metres – 3:43.69 (Bilbao 2007)

Indoor

- 800 metres – 1:48.80 (Valencia 2007)
- 1500 metres – 3:44.3 (Valencia 2006)
