= Manuel Olmedo =

Spanish middle-distance runner

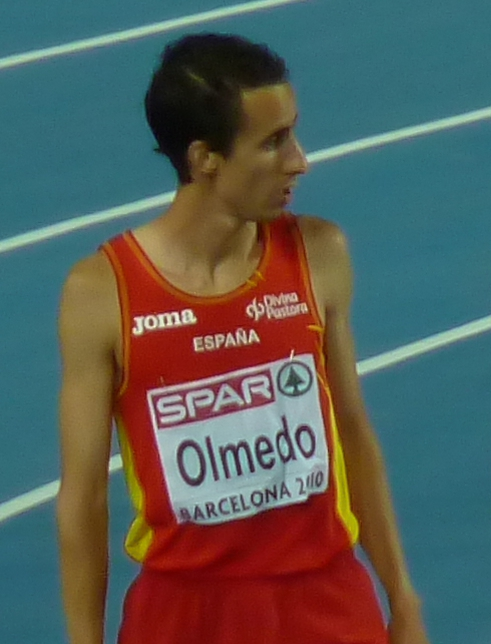

Medal record

Men's athletics

Representing Spain

European Championships
Bronze medal – third place	2010 Barcelona	1500 m

European Indoor Championships
Gold medal – first place	2011 Paris	1500 m

European U23 Championships
Silver medal – second place	2005 Erfurt	800 m
Bronze medal – third place	2003 Bydgoszcz	800 m

Manuel Olmedo Villar (born 17 May 1983) is a Spanish middle-distance runner. He specialises in the 800 metres. He represented Spain at the Olympic Games at both the 2004 Athens Games and 2008 Beijing Olympics. He also ran at the World Championships in Athletics in 2003, 2007 and 2009.

Olmedo has won medals at the European Athletics U23 Championships. His personal best in the 800 m is 1:45.13.

== Career ==
Born in Seville, Olmedo started his career with performances at junior level, competing at the 2000 World Junior Championships in Athletics. He was knocked out at the heats stage of the 2002 European Athletics Indoor Championships but he reached the final at the 2002 World Junior Championships, taking eighth place in 1:56.73.

The 2003 season marked a breakthrough for Olmedo as he took fifth in the European Athletics Indoor Cup and won the 800 m bronze medal at the 2003 European Athletics U23 Championships. He was the runner-up in the Spanish national championships that year behind Antonio Manuel Reina, gaining himself qualification into the 2003 World Championships in Athletics. At his first World Championships he was fourth in his heat, running 1:47.98, but this was not enough to qualify. Olmedo reached the Olympic stage the following year but again finished fourth in his heat, being knocked out of the 2004 Athens Olympics.

In his last appearance in non-senior competition, he won the silver medal at the 2005 European Athletics U23 Championships. He reached the 800 m semi-finals at the 2006 European Athletics Championships, but was eliminated after he finished in fourth place. He did not get past the heat stages at the 2007 European Athletics Indoor Championships, but managed to reach the semi-finals at the 2007 World Championships in Athletics in Osaka, Japan, but his near-personal best time of 1:45.61 was only enough for fifth. After recording a personal best of 1:45.13 at the Rieti IAAF Grand Prix, he was invited to the 2007 IAAF World Athletics Final and finished in sixth place. He reached the semi-finals twice at the global level in 2008 – finish fifth in his semi-final at the 2008 IAAF World Indoor Championships, and just missing out on the 800 m Olympic final at the 2008 Beijing Games (having run 1:45.91 for fourth).

He had his best performance at senior level at the 2009 European Athletics Indoor Championships, where he reached the final and finished in fifth place. He failed to match this performance at the 2009 World Championships in Athletics, however, as he did not manage to finish his heat.

== Competition record ==
Year	Competition	Venue	Position	Event	Notes
Representing Spain
2000	World Junior Championships	Santiago, Chile	5th (heats)	800 m	1:51.65
2002	European Indoor Championships	Vienna, Austria	19th (heats)	800 m	1:51.95
2002	World Junior Championships	Kingston, Jamaica	8th	800 m	1:56.73
2003	European Indoor Cup	Leipzig, Germany	5th	800 m	1:49.55
2003	European U23 Championships	Bydgoszcz, Poland	3rd	800 m	1:46.83
2003	World Championships	Paris, France	4th (heats)	800 m	1:47.98
2004	Olympic Games	Athens, Greece	4th (heats)	800 m	1:47.71
2005	European U23 Championships	Erfurt, Germany	2nd	800m	1:51.47
2006	European Championships	Gothenburg, Sweden	12th (semis)	800m	1:49.37
2007	European Indoor Championships	Birmingham, United Kingdom	12th (heats)	800m	1:54.54
2007	World Championships	Osaka, Japan	5th (semis)	800 m	1:45.61
2007	IAAF World Athletics Final	Stuttgart, Germany	6th	800m	1:47.06
2008	World Indoor Championships	Valencia, Spain	5th (semis)	800 m	1:48.90
2008	Olympic Games	Beijing, China	4th (semis)	800 m	1:45.91
2009	European Indoor Championships	Turin, Italy	5th	800 m	1:49.77
2009	World Championships	Berlin, Germany	—	800 m	DNF
2010	European Championships	Barcelona, Spain	3rd	1500 m	3:43.54
2011	European Indoor Championships	Paris, France	1st	1500 m	3:41.03
2011	European Team Championships	Stockholm, Sweden	1st	1500 m	3:38.63
