= Kemal Koyuncu =

Turkish runner

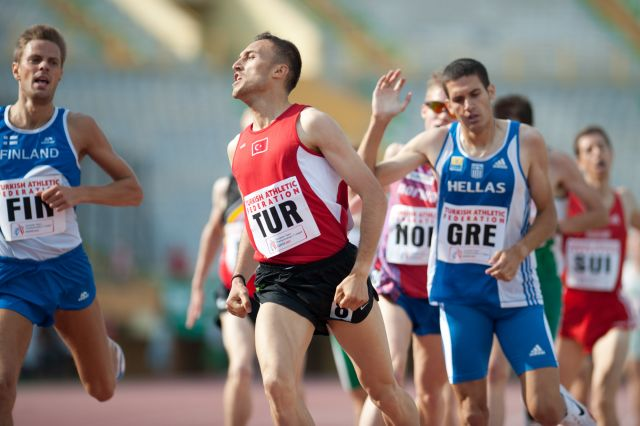
- Kemal Koyuncu

Personal information
- Nationality: Turkey
- Born: January 25, 1985 (age 41) İnegöl, Turkey

Sport
- Sport: Middle and long distance
- Club: Fenerbahçe Athletics

Achievements and titles
- Personal bests: 1,500 m 3:38.6 (2006); 3,000 m 8:19.22 (2006); 5,000 m 13:47.41 (2010); 10,000 m 28:41.37 (2007)
Medal record
Men's athletics
Representing Turkey
European Team Championships
Bronze medal – third place	2013 Gateshead	5000 m
European Indoor Championships
Silver medal – second place	2011 Paris	1500 m
European Cross Country Championships
Gold medal – first place	2007 Toro, ESP	U23 8.2 km
Bronze medal – third place	2007 Debrecen, HUN	U23 5,000 m
Mediterranean Games
Bronze medal – third place	2009 Pescara, ITA	5,000 m

Kemal Koyuncu (born January 25, 1985) is a Turkish middle and long-distance runner. He is a member of Fenerbahçe Athletics club in Istanbul.

== Achievements ==
- 5,000 m – 6th European Athletics U23 Championships on July 12–15, 2007 in Debrecen, Hungary – 13:54.32 – 3rd
- U23 8.2 km – 14th SPAR European Cross Country Championships on December 9, 2007, in Toro, Spain – 24:31 – 1st
- 5,000 m – Athletics at the 2009 Mediterranean Games between June 3 – July 3, 2009, in Pescara, Italy – 14:04.99 – 3rd

== Personal bests ==
Outdoor

- 1,500 m – 3:38.6 (June 29, 2006 – İzmir, Turkey)
- 3,000 m – 8:19.22 (June 18, 2006 – Thessaloniki, Greece)
- 5,000 m – 13:47.41 (July 29, 2010 – Barcelona, Spain)
- 10,000 m – 28:41.37 (June 2, 2007 – Neerpelt, Belgium)

Indoor

- 1,500 m – 3:41.18 (March 6, 2011 – Paris, France)
