= Colin McCourt =

English middle-distance runner

Personal information
- Nationality: British (English)
- Born: 11 December 1984 (age 41) Bournemouth, England

Sport
- Sport: Athletics
- Event: middle-distance
Medal record
Representing Great Britain

Colin McCourt (born 11 December 1984) is an English former middle distance runner.

== Biography ==
McCourt finished runner-up behind Andy Baddeley at the 2010 British Athletics Championships.

He represented England at the 2010 Commonwealth Games in Delhi.

In 2017 McCourt hit the headlines for a bet he was undertaking. Having ballooned to 94 kg (14.8 stone) since retiring from athletics, he stands to win £1700 after finishing a 5k in under 16 minutes in 2017. If he failed he had to have the names of seventeen of his friends tattooed onto his back. He finished the race in 15:38 thus beating the bet significantly.

== Achievements ==
Year	Competition	Venue	Position	Event	Notes
Representing United Kingdom
2005	European U23 Championships	Erfurt, Germany	14th (h)	1500m	3:46.66
2010	European Team Championships	Bergen, Norway	1st	1500 m	3:46.70
2010	European Championships	Barcelona, Spain	9th	1500 m	3:44.78
