= Diego Ruiz (runner) =

Spanish middle-distance runner (born 1982)

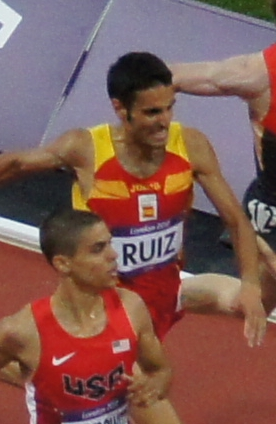
Diego Ruiz at the 2012 Summer Olympics

Diego Ruiz Sanz (born 5 February 1982) is a Spanish middle-distance runner who specializes in the 1500 metres.

He won the silver medal at the 2009 European Indoor Championships.

== Personal bests ==
- 400 metres - 47.67 s (2001)
- 800 metres - 1:46.40 min (2008)
- 1500 metres - 3:33.18 min (2011)
- Mile run - 3:57.21 min (2011)
- 3000 metres - 7:52.86 min (2010, indoor)
