= Niclas Sandells =

Finnish middle-distance runner

Niclas Sandells (born 14 March 1984, in Jakobstad) is a Finnish middle-distance runner. He competed in the 1500 metres competition at the 2012 Summer Olympics.
