= 2011 European Athletics U23 Championships – Men's 1500 metres =

The Men's 1500 metres event at the 2011 European Athletics U23 Championships was held in Ostrava, Czech Republic, at Městský stadion on 16 and 17 July.

== Medalists ==
| Gold | Florian Carvalho; France |
| Silver | James Shane; United Kingdom |
| Bronze | David Bustos; Spain |

== Results ==
=== Final ===
17 July 2011 / 16:20

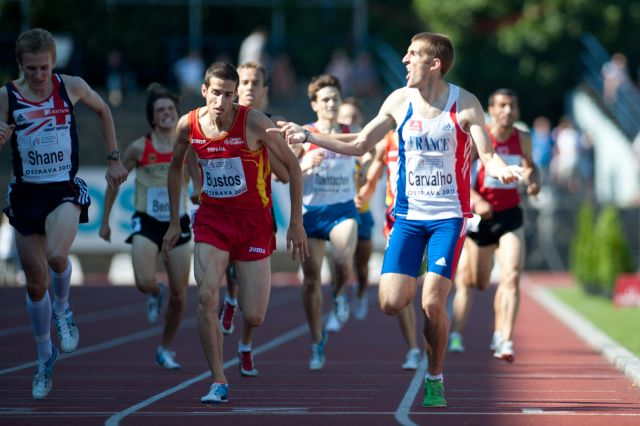
The finishing stage of the final

| Rank | Name | Nationality | Time | Notes |
|---|---|---|---|---|
| 1st place, gold medalist(s) | Florian Carvalho | France | 3:50.42 | |
| 2nd place, silver medalist(s) | James Shane | United Kingdom | 3:50.58 | |
| 3rd place, bronze medalist(s) | David Bustos | Spain | 3:50.59 | |
| 4 | Andreas Vojta | Austria | 3:50.75 | |
| 5 | Jeroen D'Hoedt | Belgium | 3:51.56 | |
| 6 | Timo Benitz | Germany | 3:51.76 | |
| 7 | Ivan Tukhtachev | Russia | 3:51.83 | |
| 8 | Alberto Imedio | Spain | 3:51.93 | |
| 9 | Cihat Ulus | Turkey | 3:52.29 | |
| 10 | Keio Kits | Estonia | 3:52.92 | |
| 11 | Stanislav Maslov | Ukraine | 3:53.14 | |
| 12 | Mark Tolstikhin | Russia | 3:53.25 | |

Intermediate times:
400m: 1:05.70 Florian Carvalho France
800m: 2:13.18 Florian Carvalho France
1200m: 3:12.08 Florian Carvalho France

=== Heats ===
Qualified: First 4 in each heat (Q) and 4 best performers (q) advance to the Final

==== Summary ====
| Rank | Name | Nationality | Time | Notes |
|---|---|---|---|---|
| 1 | Ivan Tukhtachev | Russia | 3:41.37 | Q |
| 2 | David Bustos | Spain | 3:41.37 | Q |
| 3 | Florian Carvalho | France | 3:41.54 | Q |
| 4 | James Shane | United Kingdom | 3:41.55 | Q |
| 5 | Cihat Ulus | Turkey | 3:41.67 | q PB |
| 6 | Timo Benitz | Germany | 3:41.82 | q |
| 7 | Alberto Imedio | Spain | 3:42.15 | q |
| 8 | Stanislav Maslov | Ukraine | 3:45.21 | q |
| 9 | George Daniel Preda | Romania | 3:45.83 | |
| 10 | Jeroen D'Hoedt | Belgium | 3:46.07 | Q |
| 11 | Mark Tolstikhin | Russia | 3:46.09 | Q |
| 12 | Keio Kits | Estonia | 3:46.24 | Q |
| 13 | Andreas Vojta | Austria | 3:46.25 | Q |
| 14 | Hans Kristian Fløystad | Norway | 3:46.36 | |
| 15 | Paul Robinson | Ireland | 3:46.52 | |
| 16 | Levent Ateş | Turkey | 3:46.80 | |
| 17 | Krzysztof Żebrowski | Poland | 3:46.93 | |
| 18 | Víctor José Corrales | Spain | 3:47.06 | |
| 19 | Damian Roszko | Poland | 3:47.28 | |
| 20 | Bryan Cantero | France | 3:47.30 | |
| 21 | Daniel Clorley | United Kingdom | 3:47.74 | |
| 22 | Niels Verwer | Netherlands | 3:48.05 | |
| 23 | Dániel Kállay | Hungary | 3:48.23 | |
| 24 | Matthieu Garel | France | 3:49.16 | |
| 25 | Darren McBrearty | Ireland | 3:50.39 | |
| 26 | Henrik Ingebrigtsen | Norway | 3:51.99 | |
| 27 | Matthias Stubbe | Belgium | 3:53.99 | |
| 28 | John Travers | Ireland | 3:54.31 | |
| 29 | Johan Hydén | Sweden | 4:05.00 | |
| 30 | Ali Hamdi | Belgium | 4:08.73 | |
| | Antoine Berlin | Monaco | DNF | |
| | Michele Fontana | Italy | DNF | |
| | Mario Scapini | Italy | DNF | |

==== Details ====
===== Heat 1 =====
16 July 2011 / 10:30

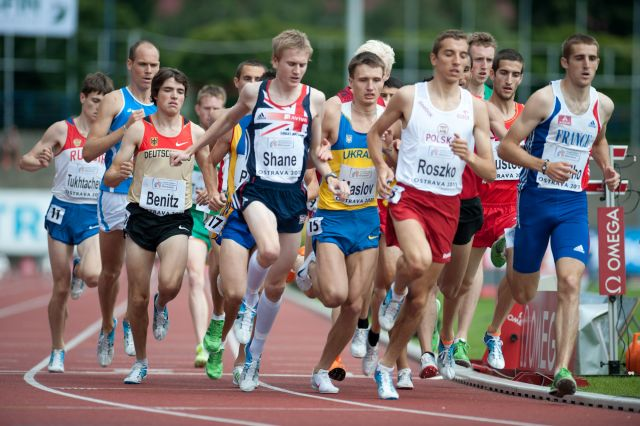
Heat 1

| Rank | Name | Nationality | Time | Notes |
|---|---|---|---|---|
| 1 | Ivan Tukhtachev | Russia | 3:41.37 | Q |
| 2 | David Bustos | Spain | 3:41.37 | Q |
| 3 | Florian Carvalho | France | 3:41.54 | Q |
| 4 | James Shane | United Kingdom | 3:41.55 | Q |
| 5 | Cihat Ulus | Turkey | 3:41.67 | q PB |
| 6 | Timo Benitz | Germany | 3:41.82 | q |
| 7 | Alberto Imedio | Spain | 3:42.15 | q |
| 8 | Stanislav Maslov | Ukraine | 3:45.21 | q |
| 9 | George Daniel Preda | Romania | 3:45.83 | |
| 10 | Hans Kristian Fløystad | Norway | 3:46.36 | |
| 11 | Damian Roszko | Poland | 3:47.28 | |
| 12 | Dániel Kállay | Hungary | 3:48.23 | |
| 13 | Darren McBrearty | Ireland | 3:50.39 | |
| 14 | John Travers | Ireland | 3:54.31 | |
| 15 | Ali Hamdi | Belgium | 4:08.73 | |
| | Antoine Berlin | Monaco | DNF | |
| | Mario Scapini | Italy | DNF | |

Intermediate times:
400m: 59.76 Florian Carvalho France
800m: 1:59.53 Hans Kristian Fløystad Norway
1200m: 2:59.46 James Shane United Kingdom

===== Heat 2 =====
16 July 2011 / 10:40

| Rank | Name | Nationality | Time | Notes |
|---|---|---|---|---|
| 1 | Jeroen D'Hoedt | Belgium | 3:46.07 | Q |
| 2 | Mark Tolstikhin | Russia | 3:46.09 | Q |
| 3 | Keio Kits | Estonia | 3:46.24 | Q |
| 4 | Andreas Vojta | Austria | 3:46.25 | Q |
| 5 | Paul Robinson | Ireland | 3:46.52 | |
| 6 | Levent Ateş | Turkey | 3:46.80 | |
| 7 | Krzysztof Żebrowski | Poland | 3:46.93 | |
| 8 | Víctor José Corrales | Spain | 3:47.06 | |
| 9 | Bryan Cantero | France | 3:47.30 | |
| 10 | Daniel Clorley | United Kingdom | 3:47.74 | |
| 11 | Niels Verwer | Netherlands | 3:48.05 | |
| 12 | Matthieu Garel | France | 3:49.16 | |
| 13 | Henrik Ingebrigtsen | Norway | 3:51.99 | |
| 14 | Matthias Stubbe | Belgium | 3:53.99 | |
| 15 | Johan Hydén | Sweden | 4:05.00 | |
| | Michele Fontana | Italy | DNF | |

Intermediate times:
400m: 1:00.06 Jeroen D'Hoedt Belgium
800m: 2:03.49 Jeroen D'Hoedt Belgium
1200m: 3:04.57 Jeroen D'Hoedt Belgium

== Participation ==
According to an unofficial count, 33 athletes from 19 countries participated in the event.

- Austria (1)
- Belgium (3)
- Estonia (1)
- France (3)
- Germany (1)
- Hungary (1)
- Ireland (3)
- Italy (2)
- Monaco (1)
- Netherlands (1)
- Norway (2)
- Poland (2)
- Romania (1)
- Russia (2)
- Spain (3)
- Sweden (1)
- Turkey (2)
- Ukraine (1)
- United Kingdom (2)
