= 2004 World Junior Championships in Athletics – Men's 1500 metres =

The men's 1500 metres event at the 2004 World Junior Championships in Athletics was held in Grosseto, Italy, at Stadio Olimpico Carlo Zecchini on 13 and 15 July.

== Medalists ==
Gold	Abdalaati Iguider; Morocco
Silver	Benson Esho; Kenya
Bronze	Brimin Kipruto; Kenya

== Results ==
=== Final ===
15 July

Rank	Name	Nationality	Time	Notes
1st place, gold medalist(s)	Abdalaati Iguider	Morocco	3:35.53	
2nd place, silver medalist(s)	Benson Esho	Kenya	3:35.80	
3rd place, bronze medalist(s)	Brimin Kipruto	Kenya	3:35.96	
4	Mohamed Moustaoui	Morocco	3:37.44	
5	Antar Zerguelaïne	Algeria	3:43.19	
6	Tom Lancashire	United Kingdom	3:43.31	
7	Mike Woods	Canada	3:43.35	
8	David Torrence	United States	3:43.62	
9	Víctor Montaner	Spain	3:45.90	
10	Barnabás Bene	Hungary	3:48.12	
11	Aïssa Dahmar	Algeria	3:51.71	
	Sultan Khamis Zaman	Qatar	DNF	

=== Heats ===
13 July

==== Heat 1 ====
Rank	Name	Nationality	Time	Notes
1	Abdalaati Iguider	Morocco	3:43.96	Q
2	Antar Zerguelaïne	Algeria	3:46.07	Q
3	Benson Esho	Kenya	3:46.46	Q
4	Hailu Dinku	Ethiopia	3:48.12	
5	Russell Brown	United States	3:49.02	
6	Adónios Koutríkis	Greece	3:49.78	
7	Moritz Waldmann	Germany	3:50.51	
8	Juan Bote	Spain	3:54.22	
9	Gary Davenport	United Kingdom	3:58.84	
10	Hamidou Garba	Niger	4:01.99	
11	Abdillahi Waberi Robleh	Djibouti	4:15.30	
	Gilio Iannone	Italy	DQ	IAAF rule 163.2
	Yousef Abu Kwaik	Palestine	DNF	

==== Heat 2 ====
Rank	Name	Nationality	Time	Notes
1	Brimin Kipruto	Kenya	3:42.08	Q
2	Sultan Khamis Zaman	Qatar	3:42.31	Q
3	Tom Lancashire	United Kingdom	3:42.48	Q
4	Mike Woods	Canada	3:42.49	q
5	Víctor Montaner	Spain	3:45.23	q
6	Nikolai Vedehin	Estonia	3:46.60	
7	Łukasz Parszczyński	Poland	3:47.08	
8	Colin Costello	Ireland	3:49.42	
9	Solomon Tsige	Ethiopia	3:50.12	
10	Romain Maquin	France	3:50.68	
11	Stefan Eberhardt	Germany	3:53.40	
12	Setefano Mika	Samoa	4:03.03	

==== Heat 3 ====
Rank	Name	Nationality	Time	Notes
1	Mohamed Moustaoui	Morocco	3:45.43	Q
2	Barnabás Bene	Hungary	3:45.82	Q
3	Aïssa Dahmar	Algeria	3:46.13	Q
4	David Torrence	United States	3:46.60	q
5	Danny Darcy	Ireland	3:47.75	
6	Isaias Haro	Mexico	3:49.51	
7	Victor Gras	France	3:51.96	
8	Adrian Danilewicz	Poland	3:54.75	
9	Kurt Benninger	Canada	3:54.82	
10	Abdalla Abdel Gadir	Sudan	4:10.61	
11	Derek Mandell	Guam	4:27.27	
12	Ben Wieczorek	Norfolk Island	4:28.05	

== Participation ==
According to an unofficial count, 37 athletes from 25 countries participated in the event.

- Algeria (2)
- Canada (2)
- Djibouti (1)
- Estonia (1)
- Ethiopia (2)
- France (2)
- Germany (2)
- Greece (1)
- Guam (1)
- Hungary (1)
- Ireland (2)
- Italy (1)
- Kenya (2)
- Mexico (1)
- Morocco (2)
- Niger (1)
- Norfolk Island (1)
- Palestine (1)
- Poland (2)
- Qatar (1)
- Samoa (1)
- Spain (2)
- Sudan (1)
- United Kingdom (2)
- United States (2)
