= 2013 European Athletics Indoor Championships – Men's 3000 metres =

The men's 3000 metres event at the 2013 European Athletics Indoor Championships was held on March 1, 2013 at 12:35 (round 1), and March 2, 18:20 (final) local time.

== Records ==
Standing records prior to the 2013 European Athletics Indoor Championships
World record	Daniel Komen (KEN)	7:24.90	Budapest, Hungary	6 February 1998
European record	Sergio Sánchez (ESP)	7:32.41	Valencia, Spain	13 February 2010
Championship record	Mo Farah (GBR)	7:40.17	Turin, Italy	7 March 2009
World Leading	Galen Rupp (USA)	7:30.16	Stockholm, Sweden	21 February 2013
European Leading	Hayle Ibrahimov (AZE)	7:39.59	Stockholm, Sweden	21 February 2013

== Results ==
=== Round 1 ===
Qualification: First 4 (Q) or and the 4 fastest athletes (q) advanced to the final.

Rank	Heat	Athlete	Nationality	Time	Note
1	2	Hayle Ibrahimov	Azerbaijan	7:50.55	Q
2	1	Ciarán O'Lionáird	Ireland	7:55.12	Q
3	1	Florian Carvalho	France	7:55.58	Q
4	2	Yoann Kowal	France	7:55.61	Q
5	1	Polat Kemboi Arıkan	Turkey	7:55.64	Q
6	1	Henrik Ingebrigtsen	Norway	7:55.77	Q
7	2	Roberto Alaiz	Spain	7:55.82	Q
8	1	Lander Tijtgat	Belgium	7:55.93	q, PB
9	2	Juan Carlos Higuero	Spain	7:55.98	Q
10	2	Halil Akkaş	Turkey	7:56.08	q, SB
11	1	Adil Bouafif	Sweden	7:58.29	q, SB
12	1	Andrey Safronov	Russia	7:59.17	q
13	2	Mateusz Demczyszak	Poland	7:59.41	
14	1	Stephen Scullion	Ireland	8:00.78	
15	2	Hans Kristian Fløystad	Norway	8:01.58	PB
16	2	Johan Hydén	Sweden	8:02.20	PB
17	2	Abdellah Haidane	Italy	8:03.20	
18	1	Ivan Strebkov	Ukraine	8:04.23	PB
19	2	Albert Minczér	Hungary	8:17.25	
20	2	John Travers	Ireland	8:23.83	
	1	Barnabás Bene	Hungary	DNF	
	1	Carlos Alonso	Spain	DQ	

=== Final ===
The final was held at 18:20.

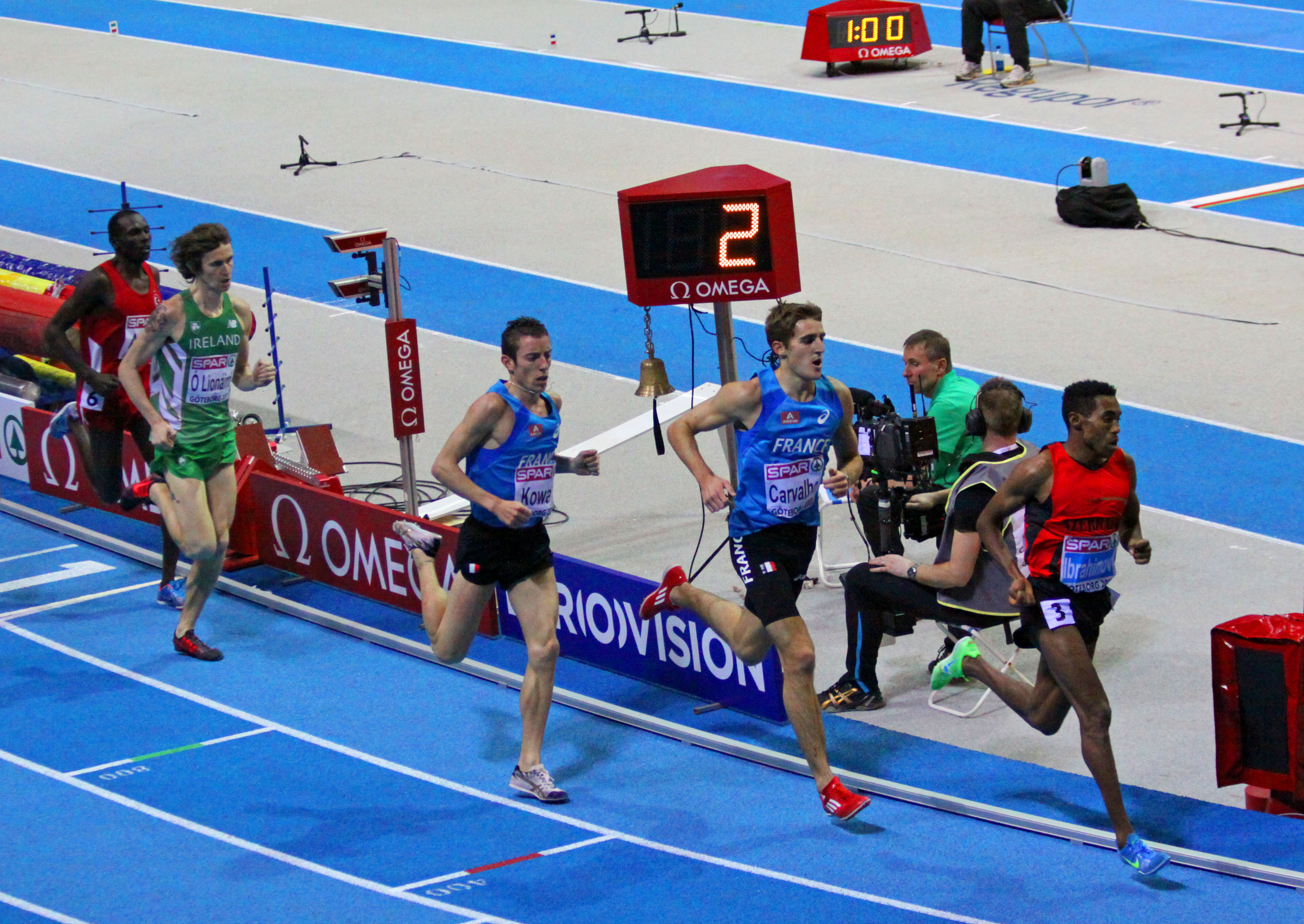
Scenes from the final

Rank	Athlete	Nationality	Time	Note
1st place, gold medalist(s)	Hayle Ibrahimov	Azerbaijan	7:49.74	
2nd place, silver medalist(s)	Juan Carlos Higuero	Spain	7:50.26	
3rd place, bronze medalist(s)	Ciarán O'Lionáird	Ireland	7:50.40	PB
4	Yoann Kowal	France	7:50.89	
5	Florian Carvalho	France	7:53.23	
6	Halil Akkaş	Turkey	7:54.89	SB
7	Roberto Alaiz	Spain	7:55.12	
8	Lander Tijtgat	Belgium	7:55.59	PB
9	Adil Bouafif	Sweden	7:59.81	
10	Polat Kemboi Arıkan	Turkey	8:00.72	
11	Henrik Ingebrigtsen	Norway	8:02.45	
12	Andrey Safronov	Russia	8:15.37	
