= 2008 World Junior Championships in Athletics – Men's 1500 metres =

The men's 1500 metres event at the 2008 World Junior Championships in Athletics was held in Bydgoszcz, Poland, at Zawisza Stadium on 8 and 10 July.

== Medalists ==
Gold	Imad Touil; Algeria
Silver	James Magut; Kenya
Bronze	Demma Daba; Ethiopia

== Results ==
=== Final ===
10 July

Rank	Name	Nationality	Time	Notes
1st place, gold medalist(s)	Imad Touil	Algeria	3:47.40	
2nd place, silver medalist(s)	James Magut	Kenya	3:47.51	
3rd place, bronze medalist(s)	Demma Daba	Ethiopia	3:47.65	
4	Fredrick Ndunge	Kenya	3:48.00	
5	Ryan Gregson	Australia	3:48.23	
6	Taha Belkorchi	Morocco	3:49.26	
7	Florian Carvalho	France	3:49.48	
8	Evan Jager	United States	3:49.59	
9	David Forrester	United Kingdom	3:51.00	
10	Dumisane Hlaselo	South Africa	3:51.71	
11	Abdel Madjid Touil	Algeria	3:51.82	
12	Mario Scapini	Italy	3:53.63	

=== Heats ===
8 July

==== Heat 1 ====
Rank	Name	Nationality	Time	Notes
1	Imad Touil	Algeria	3:48.86	Q
2	Evan Jager	United States	3:49.23	Q
3	Florian Carvalho	France	3:49.35	Q
4	Osman Omer	Sudan	3:49.39	
5	James Shane	United Kingdom	3:49.71	
6	Ivan Tukhtachev	Russia	3:50.44	
7	Richard Ringer	Germany	3:50.77	
8	Craig Huffer	Australia	3:50.90	
9	Dawit Wolde	Ethiopia	3:51.44	
10	Kamil Zieliński	Poland	3:55.45	
11	Victor Corrales	Spain	3:58.29	
12	San Naing	Myanmar	4:18.85	

==== Heat 2 ====
Rank	Name	Nationality	Time	Notes
1	Abdel Madjid Touil	Algeria	3:53.89	Q
2	Fredrick Ndunge	Kenya	3:54.18	Q
3	Demma Daba	Ethiopia	3:54.64	Q
4	Mehdi Yazidi	France	3:54.73	
5	Duncan Phillips	United States	3:55.80	
6	Szymon Sznura	Poland	3:56.25	
7	Emad Noor	Saudi Arabia	3:57.55	
8	Derlis Ayala	Paraguay	3:58.56	
9	Thomas Morrison	Canada	4:01.95	
10	Kemoy Campbell	Jamaica	4:02.80	
11	Nkosinathi Zwane	Swaziland	4:05.23	
12	Antoine Berlin	Monaco	4:07.12	

==== Heat 3 ====
Rank	Name	Nationality	Time	Notes
1	James Magut	Kenya	3:46.41	Q
2	Taha Belkorchi	Morocco	3:46.79	Q
3	Ryan Gregson	Australia	3:46.82	Q
4	Dumisane Hlaselo	South Africa	3:47.35	q
5	David Forrester	United Kingdom	3:47.64	q
6	Mario Scapini	Italy	3:47.71	q
7	David Bustos	Spain	3:48.54	
8	Nemanja Cerovac	Serbia	3:49.02	
9	Matthew Leeder	Canada	3:49.57	
10	Moses Kibet	Uganda	3:50.82	
11	Maxime Zermatten	Switzerland	3:51.82	
12	Florian Orth	Germany	3:55.45	

== Participation ==
According to an unofficial count, 36 athletes from 25 countries participated in the event.

- Algeria (2)
- Australia (2)
- Canada (2)
- Ethiopia (2)
- France (2)
- Germany (2)
- Italy (1)
- Jamaica (1)
- Kenya (2)
- Monaco (1)
- Morocco (1)
- Myanmar (1)
- Paraguay (1)
- Poland (2)
- Russia (1)
- Saudi Arabia (1)
- Serbia (1)
- South Africa (1)
- Spain (2)
- Sudan (1)
- Swaziland (1)
- Switzerland (1)
- Uganda (1)
- United Kingdom (2)
- United States (2)
