= Simon Denissel =

French middle-distance runner

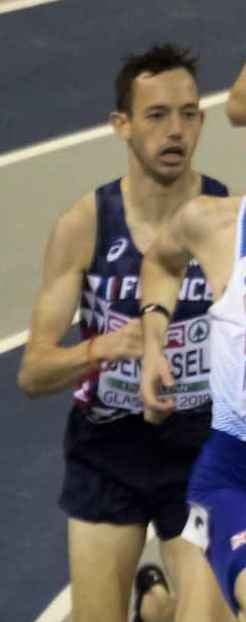

Medal record

Men's athletics

Representing France

European Indoor Championships
Bronze medal – third place	2013 Gothenburg	1500 m

Simon Denissel (born 22 May 1990 in Auchel) is a French middle-distance runner who competes in the 1500 metres and 3000 metres. His 1500 m personal best is 3:37.70 minutes. He was the bronze medallist in the event at the 2013 European Athletics Indoor Championships. He trains with Lille Métropole Athlétisme.

His international debut came as a junior in cross country running. He was 64th at the 2008 IAAF World Cross Country Championships and 21st at the 2008 European Cross Country Championships, sharing the team junior title at the latter event with Florian Carvalho and Hassan Chahdi. He managed only 88th at the 2009 World event but finished eighth in the 5000 metres at the 2009 European Athletics Junior Championships. Moving up the age categories, he was a 5000 m finalist at the 2011 European Athletics U23 Championships and placed seventh at the 2011 European Cross Country Championships, getting the under-23 team bronze with Carvalho. He also set a 1500 m best of 3:38.70 minutes that year.

He began to establish himself at the senior national level in 2013 and came third in the 1500 m at the French Athletics Championships and set a personal best of 7:51.37 minutes for the 3000 m. He was tenth at the 2012 European Cross Country Championships and helped win the under-23 team gold medal.

He started the 2013 indoor season in good form, setting a personal best of 3:38.42 minutes to win his first national 1500 m title. A run of 7:47.16 minutes for the 3000 metres at the Flanders Indoor Meeting was also a lifetime best. He was selected for the 2013 European Athletics Indoor Championships and he won his first senior medal by taking third in the 1500 m, improving his best to 3:37.70 minutes and making it a medal double for France as Mahiedine Mekhissi-Benabbad won the gold.
