= 2007 European Athletics U23 Championships – Men's 1500 metres =

The men's 1500 metres event at the 2007 European Athletics U23 Championships was held in Debrecen, Hungary, at Gyulai István Atlétikai Stadion on 13 and 15 July.

== Medalists ==
Gold	Álvaro Rodríguez; Spain
Silver	Yohan Durand; France
Bronze	Barnabás Bene; Hungary

== Results ==
=== Final ===
15 July

Rank	Name	Nationality	Time	Notes
1st place, gold medalist(s)	Álvaro Rodríguez	Spain	3:44.00	
2nd place, silver medalist(s)	Yohan Durand	France	3:44.38	
3rd place, bronze medalist(s)	Barnabás Bene	Hungary	3:44.47	
4	Mario Van Waeyenberge	Belgium	3:45.73	
5	Cristian Vorovenci	Romania	3:46.11	
6	Stefano La Rosa	Italy	3:46.37	
7	Jordán Santos	Spain	3:46.39	
8	Marco Najibe Salami	Italy	3:47.69	
9	Juan Diego Bote	Spain	3:48.25	
10	Dmitriy Gavrilov	Russia	3:48.52	
11	Oleksandr Borysyuk	Ukraine	3:48.69	
	Adrian Danilewicz	Poland	DNF	

=== Heats ===
13 July
Qualified: first 4 in each heat and 4 best to the Final

==== Heat 1 ====
Rank	Name	Nationality	Time	Notes
1	Barnabás Bene	Hungary	3:50.69	Q
2	Yohan Durand	France	3:50.76	Q
3	Stefano La Rosa	Italy	3:50.85	Q
4	Juan Diego Bote	Spain	3:51.07	Q
5	Nikolai Vedehin	Estonia	3:51.10	
6	Volodymyr Kyts	Ukraine	3:51.28	
7	Ricardo Filipe Giehl	Germany	3:51.32	
8	Tymofiy Tyumentsev	Ukraine	3:51.66	
9	Ross Toole	United Kingdom	3:52.04	
10	Koen Vandermarliere	Belgium	3:52.31	
11	Gilio Iannone	Italy	3:53.55	
	Mark Christie	Ireland	DNS	

==== Heat 2 ====
Rank	Name	Nationality	Time	Notes
1	Álvaro Rodríguez	Spain	3:45.33	Q
2	Adrian Danilewicz	Poland	3:45.78	Q
3	Cristian Vorovenci	Romania	3:46.04	Q
4	Oleksandr Borysyuk	Ukraine	3:46.07	Q
5	Marco Najibe Salami	Italy	3:46.58	q
6	Mario Van Waeyenberge	Belgium	3:46.87	q
7	Jordán Santos	Spain	3:47.16	q
8	Dmitriy Gavrilov	Russia	3:49.20	q
9	Falko Zauber	Germany	3:53.63	
10	Alexandros Kalogerogiannis	Cyprus	4:00.60	
	Tiidrek Nurme	Estonia	DNS	

== Participation ==
According to an unofficial count, 21 athletes from 13 countries participated in the event.

- Belgium (2)
- Cyprus (1)
- Estonia (1)
- France (1)
- Germany (2)
- Hungary (1)
- Italy (3)
- Poland (1)
- Romania (1)
- Russia (1)
- Spain (3)
- Ukraine (3)
- United Kingdom (1)
