= 2019 European Athletics Indoor Championships – Men's 3000 metres =

The men's 3000 metres event at the 2019 European Athletics Indoor Championships was held on 1 March 2019 at 13:20 (heats) and on 2 March 2019 at 19:47 (final) local time.

== Medalists ==
Gold	Silver	Bronze
Jakob Ingebrigtsen; Norway	Chris O'Hare; Great Britain	Henrik Ingebrigtsen; Norway

== Records ==
World record	Daniel Komen (KEN)	7:24.90	Budapest, Hungary	6 February 1998
European record	Sergio Sánchez (ESP)	7:32.41	Valencia, Spain	13 February 2010
Championship record	Ali Kaya (TUR)	7:38.42	Prague, Czech Republic	7 March 2015
World Leading	Hagos Gebrhiwet (ETH)	7:37.41	Boston, United States	26 January 2019
European Leading	Adel Mechaal (ESP)	7:45.56	Boston, United States	26 January 2019

== Results ==
=== Heats ===
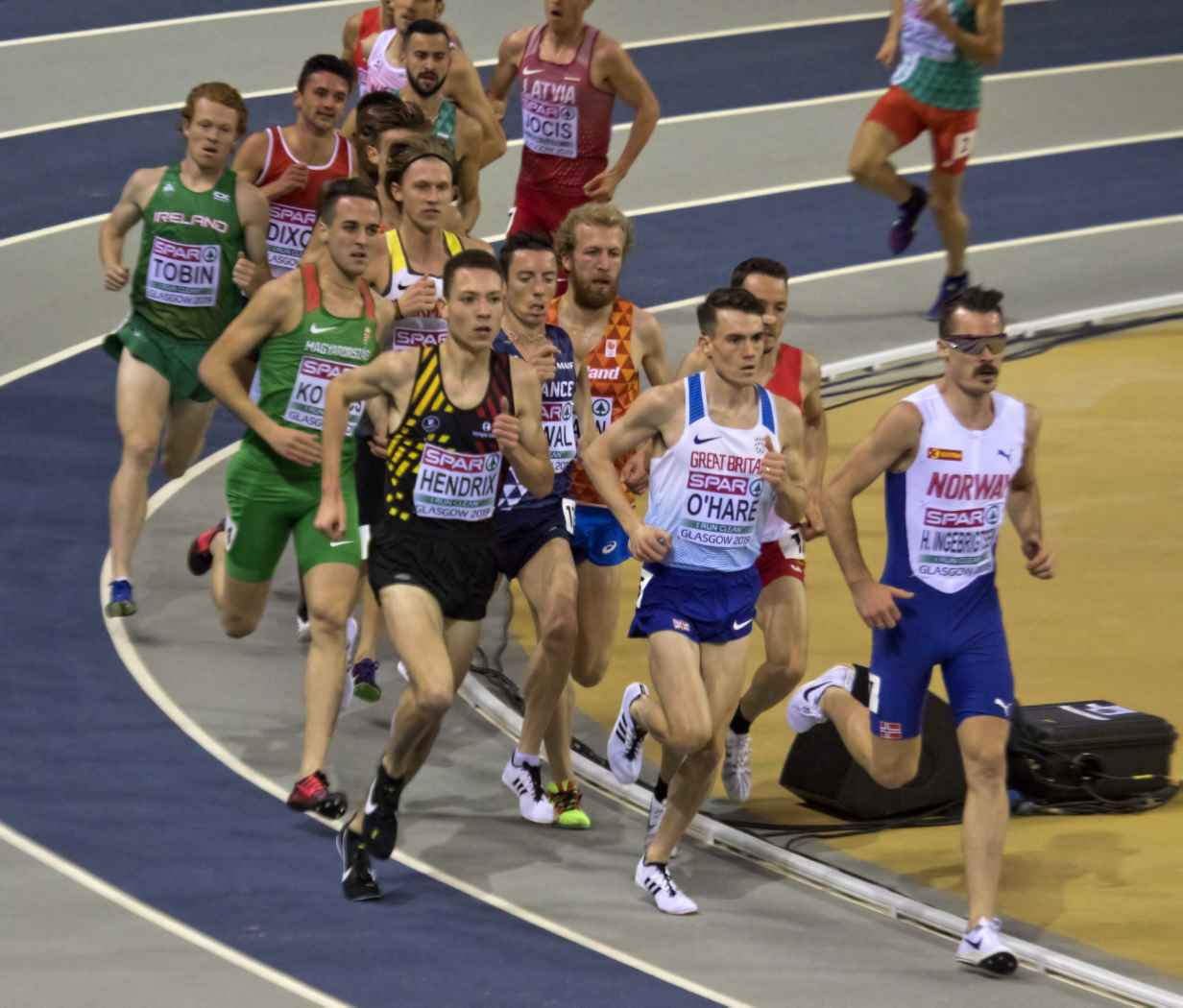
Heat 2

Qualification: First 4 in each heat (Q) and the next 4 fastest (q) advance to the Final

Rank	Heat	Athlete	Nationality	Time	Note
1	1	Jakob Ingebrigtsen	Norway	7:51.20	Q, EU20R
2	1	Andrew Butchart	Great Britain	7:51.28	Q
3	1	Djilali Bedrani	France	7:51.30	Q
4	1	Amos Bartelsmeyer	Germany	7:51.35	Q
5	1	Jimmy Gressier	France	7:51.45	q, PB
6	1	Jonas Leandersson	Sweden	7:51.47	q, PB
7	1	Sam Atkin	Great Britain	7:52.12	q, PB
8	2	Chris O'Hare	Great Britain	7:53.39	Q
9	2	Henrik Ingebrigtsen	Norway	7:53.80	Q
10	1	Florian Orth	Germany	7:54.59	q
11	2	Yoann Kowal	France	7:55.42	Q
12	2	Sam Parsons	Germany	7:55.60	Q
13	1	Topi Raitanen	Finland	7:55.71	PB
14	2	Seán Tobin	Ireland	7:56.27	SB
15	2	Mike Foppen	Netherlands	7:57.55	
16	2	Robin Hendrix	Belgium	7:58.14	
17	1	Artur Bossy	Spain	7:58.46	
18	2	Benjamin Kovács	Hungary	7:59.89	
19	1	Yegor Nikolayev	Authorised Neutral Athletes	8:00.71	
20	1	Per Svela	Norway	8:02.62	
21	2	Sergio Jiménez	Spain	8:03.58	
22	2	Suldan Hassan	Sweden	8:05.08	
23	1	Hlynur Andrésson	Iceland	8:06.97	
24	2	David Palacio	Spain	8:07.61	
25	2	Andreas Vojta	Austria	8:09.72	
26	2	Ugis Jocis	Latvia	8:09.99	SB
27	2	Benjamin Rainero de Haan	Netherlands	8:11.57	
28	2	Mitko Tsenov	Bulgaria	8:12.45	
29	1	John Travers	Ireland	8:12.54	
30	2	Harvey Dixon	Gibraltar	8:14.86	
31	1	Bram Anderiessen	Netherlands	8:18.30	
32	2	Ivo Balabanov	Bulgaria	8:20.31	
33	1	Ramazan Özdemir	Turkey	8:20.52	
	1	Dario Ivanovski	North Macedonia	DNF	

=== Final ===
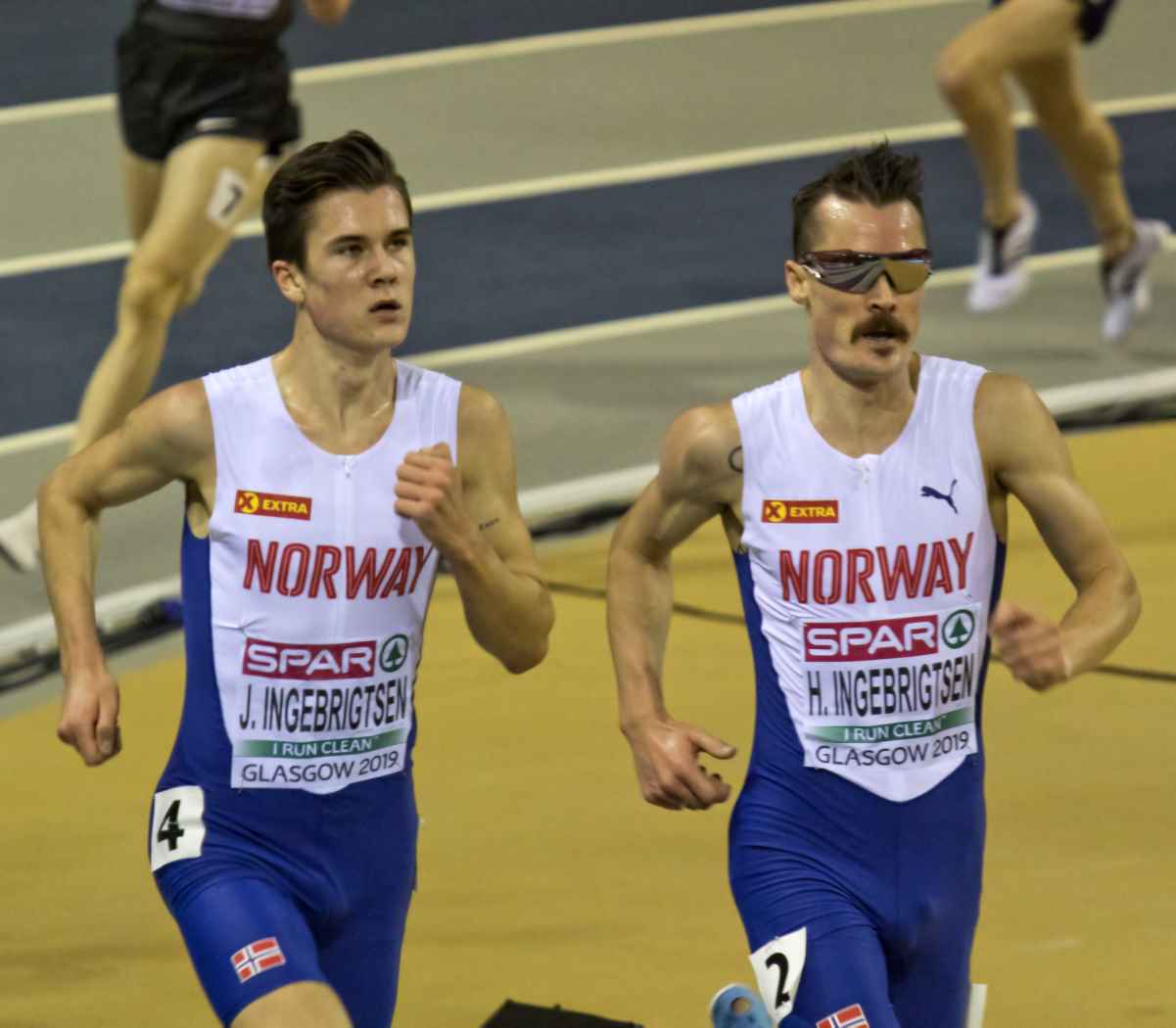
Ingebrigtsen brothers won gold and bronze

Rank	Name	Nationality	Time	Notes
1st place, gold medalist(s)	Jakob Ingebrigtsen	Norway	7:56.15	
2nd place, silver medalist(s)	Chris O'Hare	Great Britain	7:57.19	
3rd place, bronze medalist(s)	Henrik Ingebrigtsen	Norway	7:57.19	
4	Djilali Bedrani	France	7:58.40	
5	Jonas Leandersson	Sweden	7:59.16	
6	Amos Bartelsmeyer	Germany	7:59.62	
7	Jimmy Gressier	France	8:00.89	
8	Sam Atkin	Great Britain	8:01.43	
9	Yoann Kowal	France	8:02.85	
10	Andrew Butchart	Great Britain	8:03.11	
11	Florian Orth	Germany	8:05.09	
12	Sam Parsons	Germany	8:05.83	
