= 2021 European Athletics Indoor Championships – Men's 3000 metres =

The men's 3000 metres event at the 2021 European Athletics Indoor Championships was held on 6 March at 11:25 (heats) and on 7 March at 17:52 (final) local time.

== Medalists ==
Gold	Silver	Bronze
Jakob Ingebrigtsen; Norway	Isaac Kimeli; Belgium	Adel Mechaal; Spain

== Records ==
Standing records prior to the 2021 European Athletics Indoor Championships
World record	Daniel Komen (KEN)	7:24.90	Budapest, Hungary	6 February 1998
European record	Sergio Sánchez (ESP)	7:32.41	Valencia, Spain	13 February 2010
Championship record	Ali Kaya (TUR)	7:38.42	Prague, Czech Republic	7 March 2015
World Leading	Getnet Wale (ETH)	7:24.98	Liévin, France	9 February 2021
European Leading	Mohamed Katir (ESP)	7:35.29	Karlsruhe, Germany	29 January 2021

== Results ==
=== Heats ===
Qualification: First 3 in each heat (Q) and the next fastest 3 (q) advance to the Final.

Rank	Heat	Athlete	Nationality	Time	Note
1	2	Andrew Butchart	Great Britain	7:46.46	Q
2	2	Adel Mechaal	Spain	7:46.52	Q, SB
3	2	Robin Hendrix	Belgium	7:46.76	Q, PB
4	2	Hugo Hay	France	7:47.30	q, PB
5	2	Seán Tobin	Ireland	7:47.71	q, PB
6	2	Marcel Fehr	Germany	7:48.06	q, PB
7	3	Jimmy Gressier	France	7:48.93	Q
8	3	Isaac Kimeli	Belgium	7:49.46	Q
9	3	Jakob Ingebrigtsen	Norway	7:49.52	Q, PB
10	3	Mike Foppen	Netherlands	7:49.99	
11	3	Philip Sesemann	Great Britain	7:51.70	
12	2	Andreas Vojta	Austria	7:53.07	
13	3	Samuel Barata	Portugal	7:53.39	PB
14	1	Mohamed Katir	Spain	7:54.95	Q
15	1	Narve Gilje Nordås	Norway	7:55.03	Q
16	1	Jack Rowe	Great Britain	7:55.67	Q
17	1	Djilali Bedrani	France	7:55.76	
18	3	Brian Fay	Ireland	7:56.13	
19	2	Joel Ibler Lillesø	Denmark	7:56.30	
20	1	Yassin Bouih	Italy	7:56.66	
21	1	Jonas Raess	Switzerland	7:57.37	
22	2	Isaac Nader	Portugal	7:58.10	
23	3	Gonzalo García	Spain	7:59.09	
24	2	Bjørnar Sandnes Lillefosse	Norway	8:02.00	
25	3	Mikkel Dahl-Jessen	Denmark	8:03.50	
26	3	Jonatan Fridolfsson	Sweden	8:03.87	
27	1	John Travers	Ireland	8:05.96	
28	1	Jakob Dybdal Abrahamsen	Denmark	8:08.04	
29	2	John Foitzik	Sweden	8:08.63	
30	1	Vidar Johansson	Sweden	8:20.21	
31	3	Abdurrahman Gediklioğlu	Turkey	8:23.82	
	1	John Heymans	Belgium	DQ	
	2	Marcin Lewandowski	Poland	DNS	
	1	Michał Rozmys	Poland	DNS	

=== Final ===
Rank	Name	Nationality	Time	Notes
1st place, gold medalist(s)	Jakob Ingebrigtsen	Norway	7:48.20	PB
2nd place, silver medalist(s)	Isaac Kimeli	Belgium	7:49.41	
3rd place, bronze medalist(s)	Adel Mechaal	Spain	7:49.47	
4	Mohamed Katir	Spain	7:49.72	
5	Narve Gilje Nordås	Norway	7:50.21	PB
6	Hugo Hay	France	7:51.82	
7	Andrew Butchart	Great Britain	7:52.15	
8	Jimmy Gressier	France	7:52.43	
9	Jack Rowe	Great Britain	7:53.47	SB
10	Marcel Fehr	Germany	7:54.48	
11	Seán Tobin	Ireland	7:58.11	
12	Robin Hendrix	Belgium	7:59.86	
