= 2013 European Athletics Indoor Championships – Men's 1500 metres =

The men's 1500 metres event at the 2013 European Athletics Indoor Championships was held on March 2, 2013 at 13:10 (round 1), and March 3, 18:00 (final) local time.

== Records ==
Standing records prior to the 2011 European Athletics Indoor Championships
World record	Hicham El Guerrouj (MAR)	3:31.18	Stuttgart, Germany	2 February 1997
European record	Andrés Manuel Díaz (ESP)	3:33.32	Piraeus, Greece	24 February 1999
Championship record	Ivan Heshko (UKR)	3:36.70	Madrid, Spain	6 March 2005
World Leading	Galen Rupp (USA)	3:34.78	Boston, United States	26 January 2013
European Leading	Ciarán Ó Lionáird (IRL)	3:36.85	New York City, United States	16 February 2013

== Results ==
=== Round 1 ===
Qualification: First 2 (Q) or and the 3 fastest athletes (q) advanced to the final.

Rank	Heat	Athlete	Nationality	Time	Note
1	1	İlham Tanui Özbilen	Turkey	3:39.58	Q
2	1	David Bustos	Spain	3:39.90	Q
3	1	Bartosz Nowicki	Poland	3:40.15	q
4	1	Hélio Gomes	Portugal	3:40.82	q, PB
5	1	Oleksandr Borysyuk	Ukraine	3:41.87	q
6	2	Marcin Lewandowski	Poland	3:42.60	Q
7	2	Simon Denissel	France	3:42.75	Q
8	3	Mahiedine Mekhissi-Benabbad	France	3:43.33	Q
9	3	Arturo Casado	Spain	3:43.33	Q
10	2	Florian Orth	Germany	3:43.57	
11	3	Yegor Nikolayev	Russia	3:43.58	
12	1	Andréas Dimitrákis	Greece	3:44.83	
13	2	Ioan Zaizan	Romania	3:45.46	
14	3	Andreas Vojta	Austria	3:45.54	
15	2	Goran Nava	Serbia	3:45.58	
16	2	Jozef Pelikán	Slovakia	3:45.81	
17	1	Bryan Cantero	France	3:46.85	
18	3	Mitja Krevs	Slovenia	3:47.06	
19	3	Mohad Abdikadar Sheik Ali	Italy	3:47.21	
20	3	Szymon Krawczyk	Poland	3:47.84	
21	2	Álvaro Rodríguez	Spain	3:49.10	
22	3	Mark Nouws	Netherlands	3:49.78	
23	2	Volodymyr Kyts	Ukraine	3:50.65	
23	1	Najibe Salami	Italy	3:54.04	

=== Final ===
The final was held at 18:00.

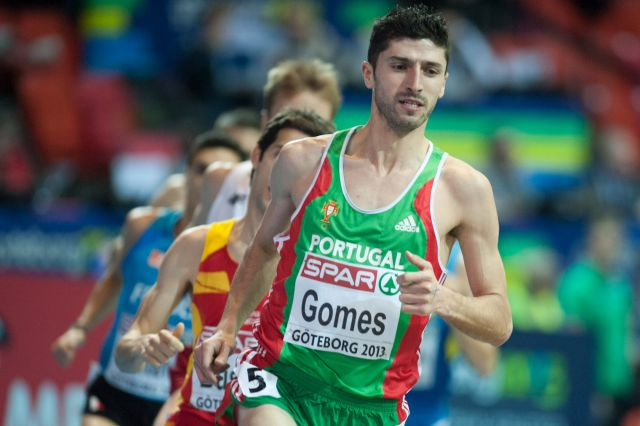
Hélio Gomes leading in the final.

Rank	Athlete	Nationality	Time	Note
1st place, gold medalist(s)	Mahiedine Mekhissi-Benabbad	France	3:37.17	
2nd place, silver medalist(s)	İlham Tanui Özbilen	Turkey	3:37.22	SB
3rd place, bronze medalist(s)	Simon Denissel	France	3:37.70	PB
4	Marcin Lewandowski	Poland	3:39.19	
5	Arturo Casado	Spain	3:39.36	SB
6	Hélio Gomes	Portugal	3:39.46	PB
7	Bartosz Nowicki	Poland	3:39.74	
8	David Bustos	Spain	3:40.14	
9	Oleksandr Borysyuk	Ukraine	3:42.15	
