= Barnabás Bene =

Hungarian runner

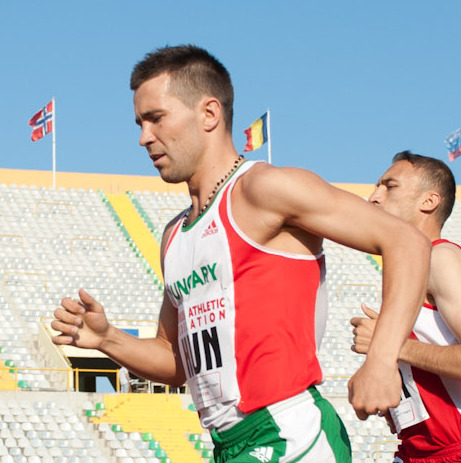
Image of Barnabás Bene

Barnabás Bene (born 27 August 1986) is a Hungarian middle- and long-distance runner who has specialized in the 1500 metres to the half marathon.

He won the gold medal at the 2003 European Youth Olympic Festival (1500 m), finished tenth at the 2004 World Junior Championships, won the gold medal at the 2005 European Junior Championships (5000 m) the bronze medal at the 2007 European U23 Championships and finished fifth at the 2007 European Indoor Championships. He competed at the 2006 European Championships (5000 m), the 2009 European Indoor Championships (1500 m), the 2011 European Indoor Championships (1500 m) and the 2013 European Indoor Championships (3000 m) without reaching the final.

He became Hungarian champion in the 1500 metres in 2006, nine times in the 5000 and 10,000 metres between 2004 and 2014, and once in the half marathon in 2009. He also became national indoor champion eleven times in the 1500 and 3000 metres between 2004 and 2011.

His personal best times are 3:39.87 minutes in the 1500 metres, achieved in May 2007 in Nijmegen; 7:59.31 minutes in the 3000 metres, achieved in August 2011 in Karlstad; 13:58.63 minutes in the 5000 metres, achieved in June 2007 in Arnhem; 29:09.02 minutes in the 10,000 metres, achieved in April 2011 in Budapest; 1:05:31 hours in the half marathon, achieved in May 2008 in Sajószentpéter; and 1:20:19 hours in the 25 kilometres, achieved in March 2010 in Harkány.
