= Jesús España =

Spanish long-distance runner

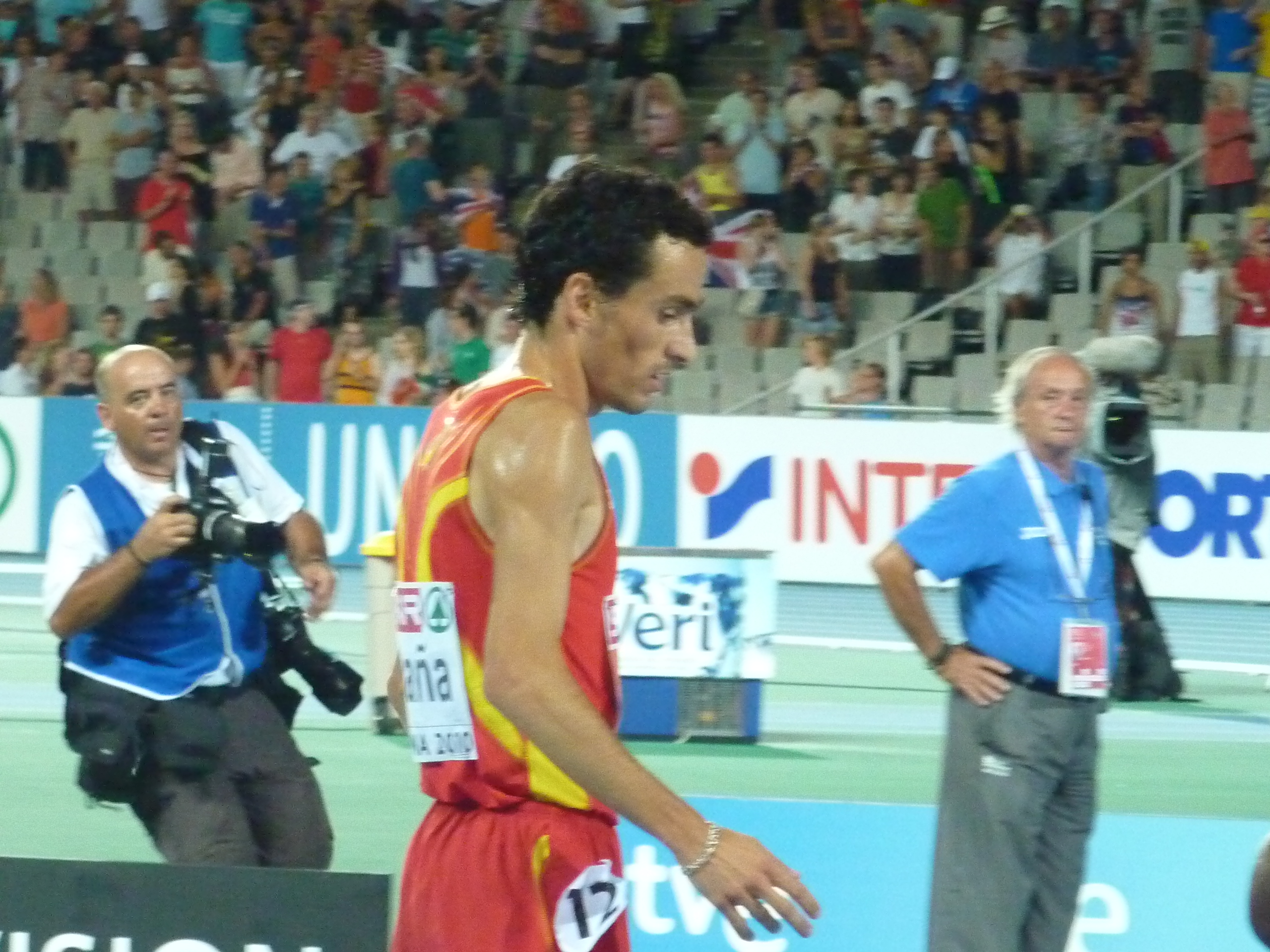
Jesús España at the 2010 European Athletics Championships

Jesús España Cobo (born 21 August 1978 in Valdemoro, Community of Madrid) is a Spanish long-distance runner, who mostly concentrates on the 3000 and 5000 metres.

España first represented Spain at the 2001 IAAF World Cross Country Championships, where he was 11th in the short race. He won his first medal the following year at the 2002 European Athletics Indoor Championships, taking the bronze medal over 3000 m. Outdoors, he came eleventh in the 5000 m at the 2002 European Athletics Championships. He came close to another medal indoors at the 2003 IAAF World Indoor Championships, finishing a fraction of a second behind the bronze medallist Luke Kipkosgei. In 2005 he won the 3000 m gold medal at the 2005 European Cup and went on to compete at the 2005 World Championships in Athletics, where he was disqualified in the heats.

At the 2006 European Championships in Athletics, España gained a narrow win in the 5000 m, overtaking Mo Farah just metres from the line. This was his first major international title. He made his Olympic debut at the 2008 Beijing Olympics, where he finished 14th in the 5000 m final. In 2009 he won the 3000 m bronze at the European Indoors, a gold medal over the distance at the 2009 European Team Championships, and finished tenth in the 5000 m final at the 2009 World Championships in Athletics.

Jesús España competed at the 2010 IAAF World Indoor Championships and came sixth, and retained his title at the 2010 European Team Championships. He attempted to defend his 5000 m title at the 2010 European Athletics Championships, but found himself beaten by Farah on this occasion, ending up with the silver medal. He ran at the San Silvestre Vallecana in Madrid on New Year's Eve and took third place on the podium behind Zersenay Tadese and fellow Spaniard Ayad Lamdassem. He was fifth over 3000 m at the 2011 European Athletics Indoor Championships in March and won the Great Ireland Run in April.

== Achievements ==
Year	Competition	Venue	Position	Event	Notes
1997	European Junior Championships	Ljubljana, Slovenia	9th	1500 m	3:50.95
2002	European Indoor Championships	Vienna, Austria	3rd	3000 m	7:48.08
2002	European Championships	Munich, Germany	11th	5000 m	13:55.80
2003	World Indoor Championships	Birmingham, United Kingdom	4th	3000 m	7:42.70
2003	World Athletics Final	Monte Carlo, Monaco	9th	3000 m	7:57.33
2004	Ibero-American Championships	Huelva, Spain	1st	5000 m	13:48.09
2005	World Championships	Helsinki, Finland	–	5000 m	DQ
2006	European Championships	Göteborg, Sweden	1st	5000 m	13:44.70
2006	World Cup	Athens, Greece	6th	3000 m	7:50.09
2007	European Indoor Championships	Birmingham, United Kingdom	3rd	3000 m	8:02.91
2007	World Championships	Osaka, Japan	7th	5000 m	13:50.55
2008	Olympic Games	Beijing, China	14th	5000 m	13:55.94
2009	European Indoor Championships	Turin, Italy	3rd	3000 m	7:43.29
2009	World Championships	Berlin, Germany	10th	5000 m	13:22.07
2010	World Indoor Championships	Doha, Qatar	6th	3000 m	7:42.82
2010	European Championships	Barcelona, Spain	2nd	5000 m	13:33.12
2011	European Indoor Championships	Paris, France	5th	3000 m	7:54.66
2011	European Team Championships	Stockholm, Sweden	1st	5000 m	13:39.25
2011	World Championships	Daegu, South Korea	12th	5000 m	13:33.99
2012	European Championships	Helsinki, Finland	20th	5000 m	13:55.98
2014	European Championships	Zürich, Switzerland	11th	5000 m	14:14.57
2015	European Indoor Championships	Prague, Czech Republic	4th	3000 m	7:47.12
2015	World Championships	Beijing, China	26th (h)	5000m	13:51.47
2016	European Championships	Amsterdam, Netherlands	10th	Half marathon	1:04:01
2016	Olympic Games	Rio de Janeiro, Brazil	65th	Marathon	2:20:08
2018	European Championships	Berlin, Germany	6th	Marathon	2:12:58

=== Personal bests ===
- 1500 metres – 3:36.53 min (2002)
- 3000 metres – 7:38.26 min (2006)
- 5000 metres – 13:04.73 min (2011)
- 10,000 metres – 28:26.27 min (2012)
- Half marathon – 1:03:28 (2016)
- Marathon – 2:11:58 (2016)
