= 2010 World Junior Championships in Athletics – Men's 5000 metres =

The men's 5000 metres event at the 2010 World Junior Championships in Athletics was held in Moncton, New Brunswick, Canada, at Moncton Stadium on 24 July.

== Medalists ==
Gold	David Kiprotich Bett; Kenya
Silver	John Kipkoech; Kenya
Bronze	Aziz Lahbabi; Morocco

== Results ==
=== Final ===
24 July

Rank	Name	Nationality	Time	Notes
1st place, gold medalist(s)	David Kiprotich Bett	Kenya	13:23.76	
2nd place, silver medalist(s)	John Kipkoech	Kenya	13:26.03	
3rd place, bronze medalist(s)	Aziz Lahbabi	Morocco	13:28.92	
4	Moses Kibet	Uganda	13:36.59	
5	Belete Assefa	Ethiopia	13:42.10	
6	Atsedu Tsegay	Ethiopia	13:54.24	
7	Kazuto Nishiike	Japan	13:54.33	
8	Akinobu Murasawa	Japan	13:59.66	
9	Vianney Ndiho	Burundi	14:04.99	
10	Jesper van der Wielen	Netherlands	14:09.11	
11	Trevor Dunbar	United States	14:16.08	
12	Aitor Fernández	Spain	14:31.70	
13	John Travers	Ireland	14:55.12	
14	Ross Proudfoot	Canada	15:03.13	
15	Joseph Chebet	Uganda	15:07.36	
16	Kevin Batt	Australia	15:50.44	
	Delohnni Nicol-Samuel	Saint Vincent and the Grenadines	DNF	
	Hicham Sigueni	Morocco	DNF	
	Ibrahima Sow	Guinea	DNF	

== Participation ==
According to an unofficial count, 19 athletes from 14 countries participated in the event.

- Australia (1)
- Burundi (1)
- Canada (1)
- Ethiopia (2)
- Guinea (1)
- Ireland (1)
- Japan (2)
- Kenya (2)
- Morocco (2)
- Netherlands (1)
- Saint Vincent and the Grenadines (1)
- Spain (1)
- Uganda (2)
- United States (1)
