= James Shane =

British middle-distance runner

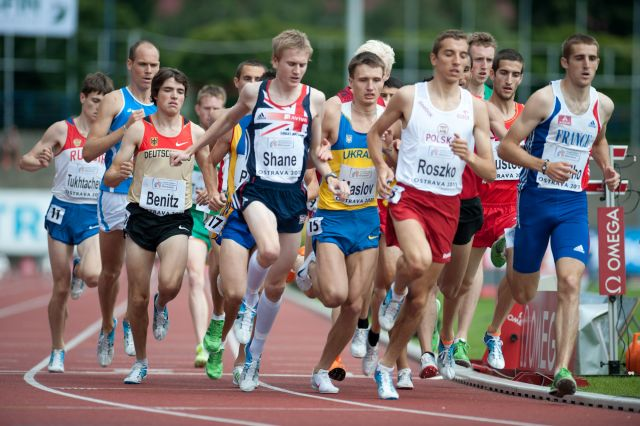
- Shane at the 2011 European Athletics U23 Championships in Ostrava

Personal information
- Nationality: British (English)
- Born: 18 December 1989 (age 36) Billericay, England

Sport
- Sport: Athletics
- Event: middle-distance
- Club: Newham and Essex Beagles

James Mark Shane (born 18 December 1989) is an English former middle-distance runner.

== Biography ==
He attended Mayflower High School in Billericay. He runs for Newham and Essex Beagles athletics club and also holds a black belt in Judo. Shane's 1500m personal best is 3.36.22 which he ran on route to winning the UK Championship title in 2011.

Shane became the British 1500 metres champion after winning the 2011 British Athletics Championships.

== International competitions ==
Year	Competition	Venue	Position	Event	Notes
Representing Great Britain
2008	World Junior Championships	Bydgoszcz, Poland	14th (h)	1500m	3:49.71
2011	European Team Championships	Stockholm, Sweden	3rd	1500 m	3:39.21
2011	European U23 Championships	Ostrava, Czech Republic	2nd	1500 m	3:50.58
2011	World Championships	Daegu, Korea	10th (heats)	1500 m	3:41.17
