= Mike Tate =

Canadian long-distance runner

Personal information
- Born: 1 April 1995 (age 31)

Sport
- Country: Canada
- Sport: Long-distance running
- College team: Southern Utah Thunderbirds

Mike Tate (born 1 April 1995) is a Canadian long-distance runner. In 2019, he competed in the senior men's race at the 2019 IAAF World Cross Country Championships held in Aarhus, Denmark. He finished in 108th place.

In 2019, he finished in 7th place in the senior 10,000 metres event at the 2019 NACAC Cross Country Championships held in Port of Spain, Trinidad and Tobago. In the same year, he also competed in the men's 5000 metres event at the 2019 Summer Universiade held in Naples, Italy. He finished in 6th place.
