= Andreas Lommer =

Danish long-distance runner

Personal information
- Full name: Andreas Schonberg Lommer
- Born: 7 November 1991 (age 34)

Sport
- Country: Denmark
- Sport: Athletics
- Event: Long-distance running

Andreas Schonberg Lommer (born 7 November 1991) is a Danish long-distance runner. He competed in the men's race at the 2020 World Athletics Half Marathon Championships held in Gdynia, Poland.

In 2015, he competed in the men's 1500 metres event at the Summer Universiade held in Gwangju, South Korea.

== Personal bests ==
Outdoor

- 1500 metres – 3:49.64 (Watford 2015)
- 5000 metres – 13:58.31 (Aalborg 2020)
- 10,000 metres – 29:18.94 (Odense 2020)

Road

- Half marathon – 1:03:52 (Barcelona 2020)
- Marathon – 2:17:21 (Copenhagen 2022)
