= Ivan Tukhtachev =

Russian middle-distance runner

Ivan Yurievich Tukhtachev (Russian: Иван Юрьевич Тухтачёв; born 13 July 1989, in Angarsk) is a Russian middle-distance runner.

== Career ==
Tukhtachev became Russian junior champion in the 1500 metres in 2008 in Cheboksary, and subsequently competed at the 2008 World Junior Championships without reaching the final. Becoming Russian U23 champion in the 800 metres in 2009, he became European U23 champion and Russian champion in the 1500 metres.

In 2010 he became Russian U23 indoor champion (800) and Russian indoor champion (1500), and finished eighth in the 1500 metres at the 2010 European Team Championships Super League. His second and last Russian indoor title in 2011 was followed by participation at the 2011 European Indoor Championships without reaching the final; a ninth place at the 2011 European Team Championships Super League and seventh place at the 2011 European U23 Championships. His lifetime best in the 800 metres was 1:45.47 minutes, achieved in July 2011 in Zhukovskiy.

In 2012 he finished second at the Russian Indoor Championships (800), third and fourth at the Russian Championships (800 and 1500) and competed at the 2012 Summer Olympics (800) without reaching the final. His last elite performances came when he finished third at the 2013 Russian Indoor Championships, fifth at the 2013 Russian Championships (both 800) and set his lifetime best in the 1500 metres with 3:39.46 minutes at the 2014 Russian Team Championships in Sochi.
