= Lee Emanuel =

British athlete (born 1985)

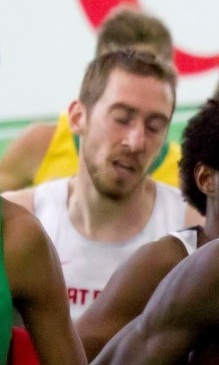
- Emanuel at the 2016 World Indoor Championships

Personal information
- Born: 24 January 1985 (age 41) Hastings, England
- Education: Sheffield Hallam University; University of New Mexico
- Height: 1.78 m (5 ft 10 in)
- Weight: 69 kg (152 lb)

Sport
- Sport: Track and field
- Event: middle-distance
- Club: Hastings AC; City of Sheffield and Dearne AC
- Coached by: Ron Warhurst (2012–2013); Joe Franklin (2008–2011, 2013–)
Medal record
Men's athletics
Representing Great Britain
European Indoor Championships
| Silver medal – second place | 2015 Prague | 3000 m |

Lee Richard Emanuel (born 24 January 1985) is an English former middle-distance runner.

== Biography ==
He represented Great Britain at the 2014 and 2016 World Indoor Championships. In addition he won a silver medal at the 2015 European Indoor Championships. Lee attended the University of New Mexico where he won 2 indoor Mile titles in NCAA Indoor Track and Field.

He twice made the podium at the British Athletics Championships in 2009 and 2013.

== Competition record ==
| Year | Competition | Venue | Position | Event | Notes |
Representing Great Britain and England
| 2010 | Commonwealth Games | Delhi, India | 19th | 5000 m | 14:31.38 |
| 2014 | World Indoor Championships | Sopot, Poland | 19th (h) | 1500 m | 3:48.09 |
| 2014 | Commonwealth Games | Glasgow, United Kingdom | 20th (h) | 1500 m | 3:46.29 |
| 2015 | European Indoor Championships | Prague, Czech Republic | 2nd | 3000 m | 7:44.48 |
| 2016 | World Indoor Championships | Portland, United States | 6th | 3000 m | 8:00.70 |
| 2016 | European Championships | Amsterdam, Netherlands | 6th | 1500 m | 3:47.57 |

== Personal bests ==
Outdoor

- 1500 metres – 3:36.35 (Heusden-Zolder 2015)
- One mile – 3:54.75 (London 2013)
- 3000 metres – 7:51.30 (London 2015)
- 5000 metres – 13:31.56 (Walnut 2010)

Indoor

- 1500 metres – 3:35.66 (Birmingham 2015)
- One mile – 3:54.30 (New York 2014)
- 3000 metres – 7:44.48 (Prague 2015)
