= Yohan Durand =

French middle and long distance runner

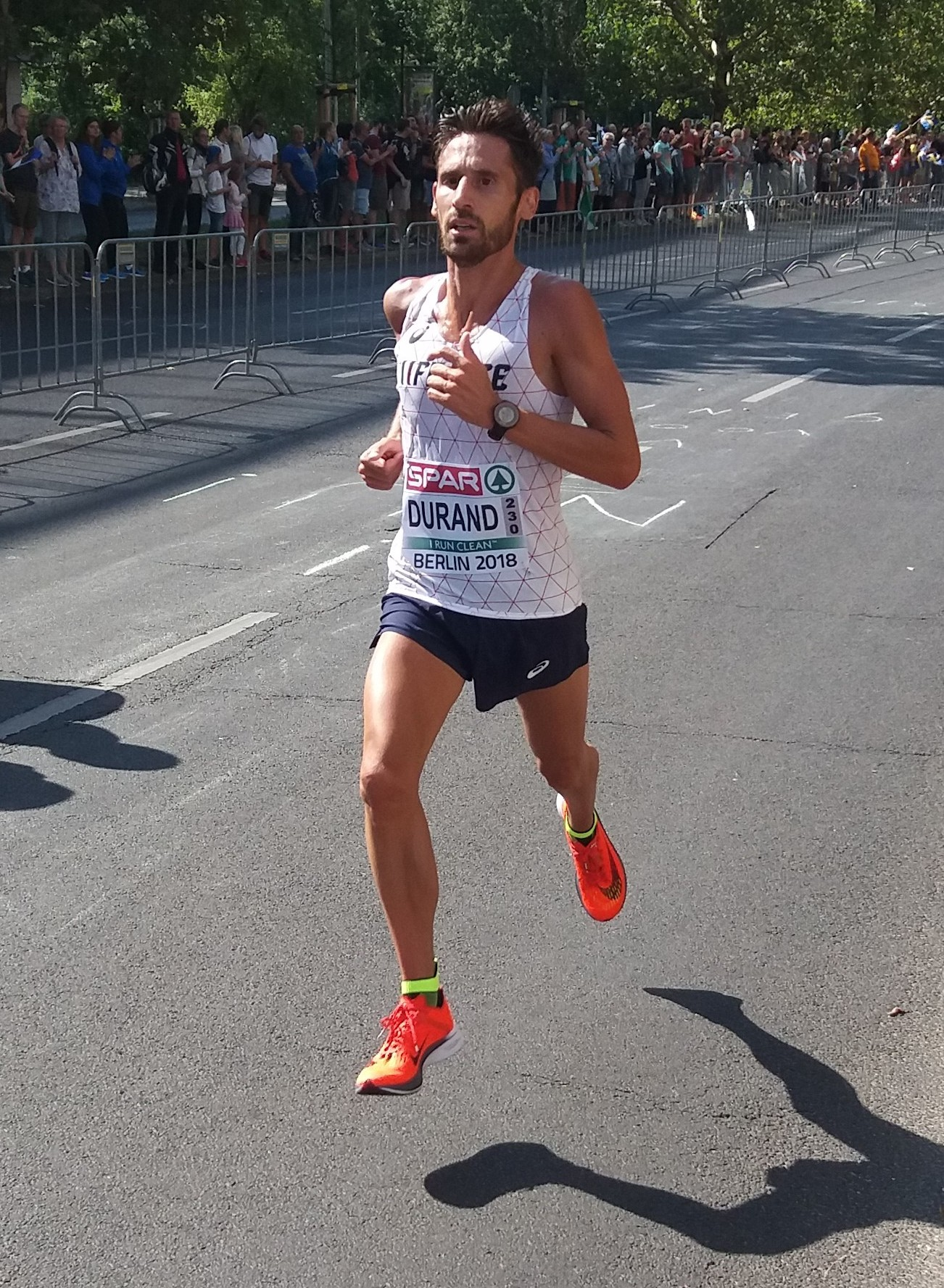
Yohan Durand - Marathon 2018 European Athletics Championships

Yohan Durand (born 14 May 1985 in Bergerac, Dordogne) is a French middle and long distance runner.

In 2018, he competed in the men's marathon at the 2018 European Athletics Championships held in Berlin, Germany. He finished in 31st place.

== Achievements ==
Year	Competition	Venue	Position	Event	Notes
Representing France
2005	European U23 Championships	Erfurt, Germany	18th	5000m	14:59.86
2007	European U23 Championships	Debrecen, Hungary	2nd	1500m	3:44.38
2007	European U23 Championships	Debrecen, Hungary	4th	5000m	13:54.37
2011	European Indoor Championships	Paris, France	7th	3000 m	8:02.40
2012	World Indoor Championships	Istanbul, Turkey	16th (h)	3000 m	7:59.10
2012	European Championships	Helsinki, Finland	4th	5000 m	13:32.65
2016	European Championships	Amsterdam, Netherlands	53rd	Half marathon	1:07:32
