= Robin Hendrix =

Belgian long-distance runner

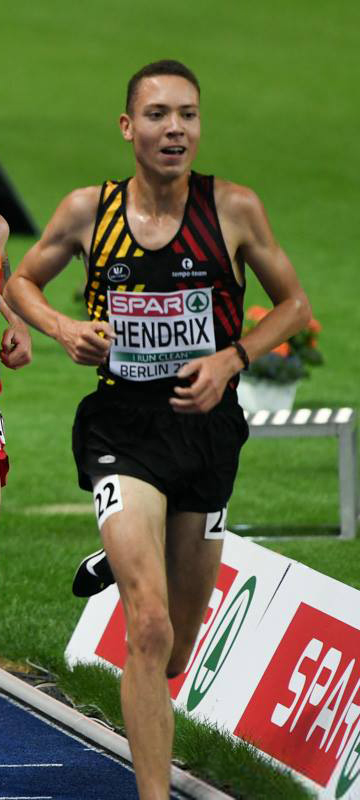
- Robin Hendrix in 2018

Personal information
- Nationality: Belgian
- Born: 14 January 1995 (age 31)

Sport
- Country: Belgium
- Sport: Athletics
- Event: Long-distance running
Medal record
Men's athletics
Representing Belgium
European Cross Country Championships
Silver medal – second place	2024 Antalya	Senior team
Bronze medal – third place	2023 Brussels	Senior race
Universiade
Bronze medal – third place	2019 Naples	5000 m

Robin Hendrix (born 14 January 1995) is a Belgian long-distance runner. He is the Belgian indoor record holder for the 5000 metres.

Hendrix won one national title.

== Career ==
Hendrix competed in the men's under-23 category at the 2017 European Cross Country Championships held in Šamorín, Slovakia. He finished in 7th place and he won the silver medal in the team race, alongside Simon Debognies and Michael Somers. The following year, he finished in 15th place in the senior men's race at the 2018 European Cross Country Championships held in Tilburg, Netherlands.

In 2018, he also competed in the men's 5000 metres event at the 2018 European Athletics Championships held in Berlin, Germany. He finished in 15th place.

In 2019, he competed in the men's 3000 metres event at the 2019 European Athletics Indoor Championships held in Glasgow, Scotland. He did not qualify to compete in the final. In the same year, he also competed in the men's 5000 metres event at the 2019 Summer Universiade held in Naples, Italy and he won the bronze medal. He also competed in the men's 5000 metres event at the 2019 World Athletics Championships held in Doha, Qatar. He did not qualify to compete in the final.

In 2020, he won the gold medal in the men's 3000 metres at the 2020 Belgian Indoor Athletics Championships held in Ghent, Belgium. In 2021, he reached the final in the men's 3000 metres event at the 2021 European Athletics Indoor Championships held in Toruń, Poland.

== Achievements ==
=== Personal bests ===
- 1500 metres – 3:39.11 (Ninove 2018)
  - 1500 metres indoor – 3:40.83 (Liévin 2021)
- 3000 metres – 7:48.72 (Leuven 2022)
  - 3000 metres indoor – 7:40.53 (Karlsruhe 2023)
- 5000 metres – 13:19.50 (Palo Alto, CA 2019)
  - 5000 metres indoor – 13:17.65 (Boston, MA 2023) NR
- 10,000 metres – 28:01.65 (Pacé 2022)

Road

- 5 kilometres – 13:19 (Bolzano 2020) NB
- 10 kilometres – 28:22 (Lokeren 2020)

=== National titles ===
- Belgian Indoor Athletics Championships
  - 3000 metres: 2020
