= David Kiprotich Bett =

Kenyan long-distance runner

Personal information
- Nationality: Kenya
- Born: 18 October 1992 (age 33) Narok

Sport
- Sport: Running
- Event(s): 3000 metres, 5000 metres

Achievements and titles
- Personal best(s): 3000 m: 7:37.51 m (Berlin 2010); 5000 m: 13:06.06 m (Zürich 2010)
Medal record
Representing Kenya
Men's athletics
World Junior Championships
Gold medal – first place	2010 Moncton	5000 m
World Youth Championships
Silver medal – second place	2009 Brixen	3000 m

David Kiprotich Bett (born 18 October 1992) is a Kenyan long-distance runner, who specialises in the 5000 meters and road racing. Top finishes include winning the 2019 B.A.A. 10K and 2022 Cooper River Bridge Run 10K, and in 2022 finished 3rd at the prestigious Falmouth Road Race and 4th at Bloomsday 12 km. He is under management with International Elite T. C.

At the 2010 World Junior Championships in Athletics in Moncton, Canada, Bett won a gold medal over 5000 m.

At the 2009 World Youth Championships in Athletics in Brixen, Italy, Bett won a silver medal over 3000 m.

== Personal best ==
Distance	Time	venue
3000 m	7:37.51 m	Berlin, Germany (22 August 2010)
5000 m	13:06.06 m	Zürich, Switzerland (19 August 2010)
