= Andreas Vojta =

Austrian middle-distance runner

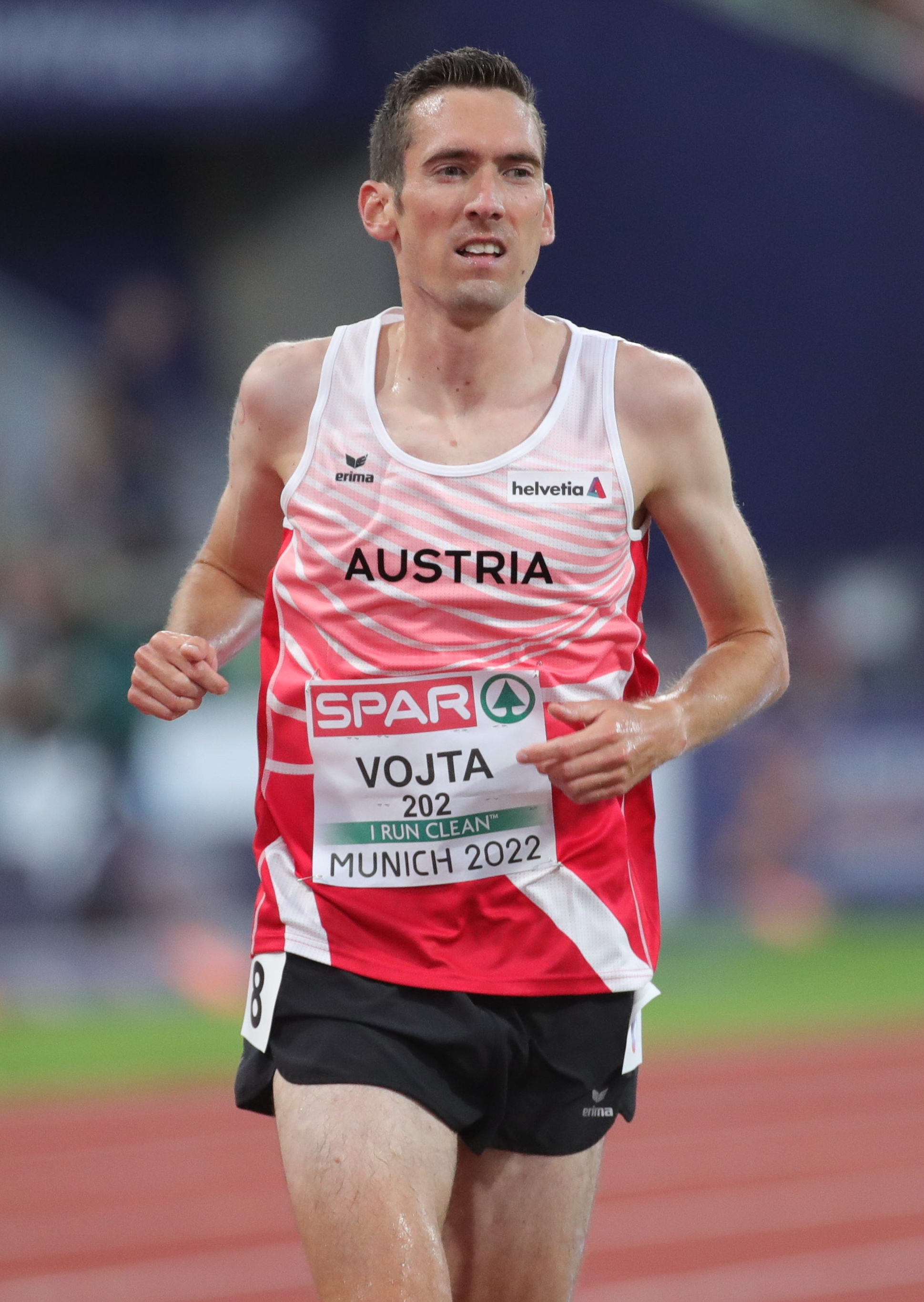
- Vojta in 2022

Personal information
- Nationality: Austrian
- Born: 9 June 1989 (age 37) Vienna, Austria

Sport
- Sport: Track
- Event: 800 metres – 10,000 metres

Achievements and titles
- Personal bests: 800m: 1:46.59 (2013); 1500m: 3:36.11 (2014); Mile: 3:53.95 (2013); 5000m: 13:24.03 (2020); 10,000m: 28:06.88 (2022)
Medal record
Men's athletics
Representing Austria
Summer Universiade
Bronze medal – third place	2013 Kazan	800 m
Bronze medal – third place	2017 Taipei	5000 m
European Games
Gold medal – first place	2015 Baku	Mixed team
- Updated on September 16, 2018

Andreas Vojta (born 9 June 1989 in Vienna) is an Austrian distance runner. He competed in the 1500 metres competition at the 2012 Summer Olympics. He is the current Austrian marathon champion.

== Running career ==
Andreas Vojta began his running career at LCC Vienna. He was initially trained by Renata Sitek and then rose to the training group of athletic conductor Wilhelm Lilge. After finishing a strong 11th overall in the men's 1500 metres at the 2010 European Athletics Championships, he was named Austrian athlete of the year and was awarded the "Golden Emil".

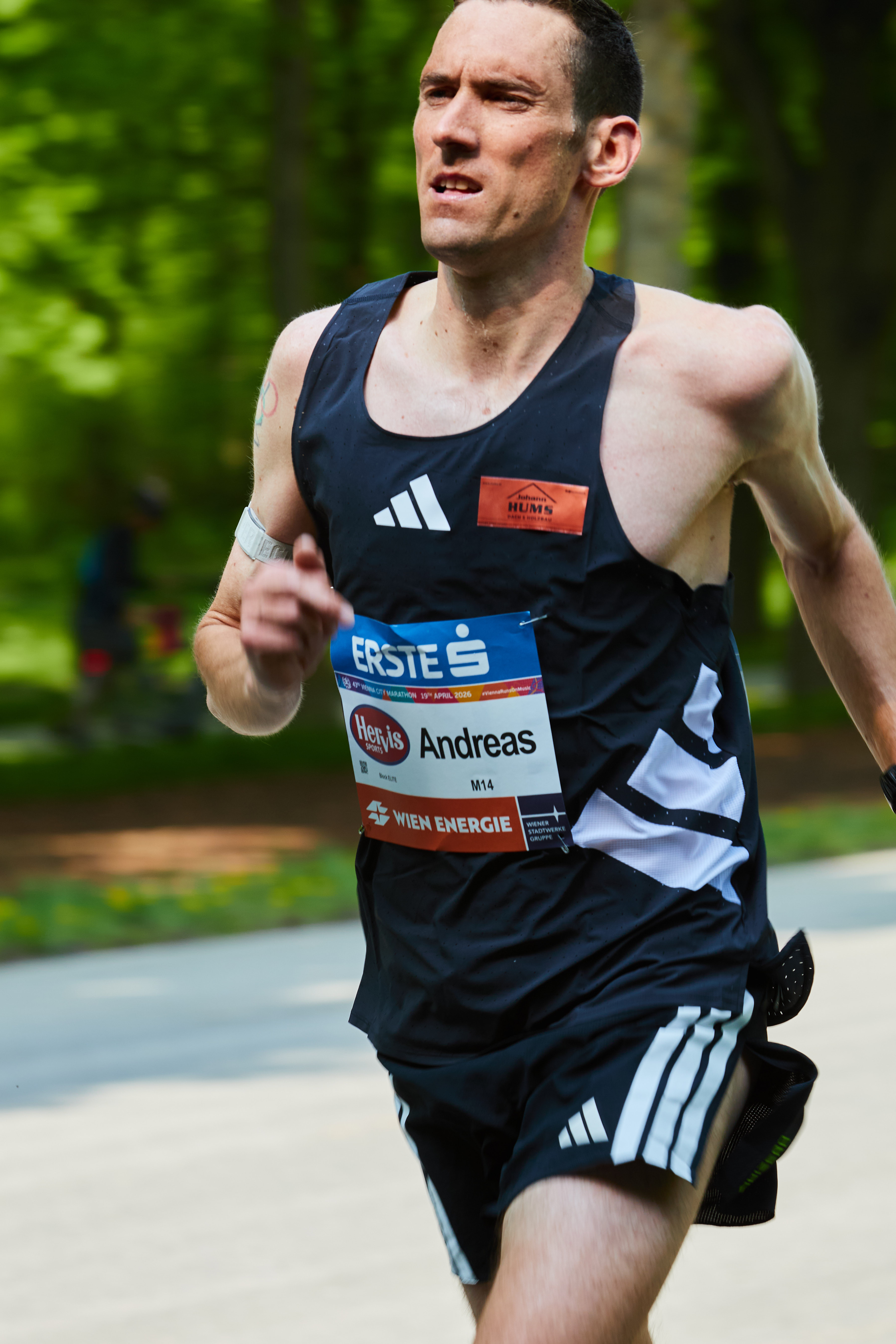

== Competition record ==
Year	Competition	Venue	Position	Event	Notes
Representing Austria
2010	European Championships	Barcelona, Spain	11th	1500 m	3:45.68
2011	European Indoor Championships	Paris, France	21st (h)	1500 m	3:49.24
2011	European U23 Championships	Ostrava, Czech Republic	4th	1500 m	3:50.75
2011	World Championships	Daegu, South Korea	22nd (h)	1500 m	3:41.34
2012	European Championships	Helsinki, Finland	9th	1500 m	3:53.23
2012	Olympic Games	London, United Kingdom	36th (h)	1500 m	3:43.52
2013	European Indoor Championships	Gothenburg, Sweden	14th (h)	1500 m	3:45.54
2013	Universiade	Kazan, Russia	3rd	800 m	1:47.31
2014	World Indoor Championships	Sopot, Poland	12th (h)	1500 m	3:42.10
2014	European Championships	Zürich, Switzerland	–	1500 m	DQ
2015	European Indoor Championships	Prague, Czech Republic	24th (h)	3000 m	8:20.56
2015	Universiade	Gwangju, South Korea	28th (h)	800 m	1:54.18
2015	Universiade	Gwangju, South Korea	10th	1500 m	3:54.58
2016	European Championships	Amsterdam, Netherlands	32nd (h)	1500 m	3:46.32
2017	European Indoor Championships	Belgrade, Serbia	10th	3000 m	8:09.18
2017	Universiade	Taipei, Taiwan	3rd	5000 m	14:02.65
2018	European Championships	Berlin, Germany	19th	5000 m	13:42.75
2019	European Indoor Championships	Glasgow, United Kingdom	25th (h)	3000 m	8:09.72
2021	European Indoor Championships	Toruń, Poland	12th (h)	3000 m	7:53.07
2022	European Championships	Munich, Germany	22nd	10,000 m	29:56.71
2021	European Indoor Championships	Toruń, Poland	12th (h)	3000 m	7:53.07
2023	Vienna City Marathon	Vienna, Austria	14th Overall, 1st Austrian	Marathon	2:19:27
2026	European Championships	Birmingham, United Kingdom	26th	Marathon	2:15:34

== Personal bests ==
Outdoor

- 800 metres – 1:46.59 (Salzburg 2013)
- 1000 metres – 2:18.06 (Ostrava 2014) NR
- 1500 metres – 3:36.11 (Glasgow 2014)
- Mile – 3:53.95 (Oslo 2013)
- 3000 metres – 7:49.75 (Ostrava 2021)
- 5000 metres – 13:24.03 (Ostrava 2020)
- 10,000 metres – 28:06.88 (Pacé 2022)
- 5K – 13:48 (Monaco 2021) NR
- 10K – 28:54 (Berlin 2022)
- Half marathon – 1:03:18 (Prague 2022)
- Marathon – 2:19:27 (Vienna 2023)

Indoor

- 800 metres – 1:47.14 (Linz 2013)
- 1000 metres – 2:19.20 (Stockholm 2013) NR
- 1500 metres – 3:38.99 (Vienna 2012)
- 3000 metres – 7:51.17 (Madrid 2020)

== See also ==
- Austria at the 2012 Summer Olympics
