= 2015 European Athletics Indoor Championships – Men's 3000 metres =

The men's 3000 metres event at the 2015 European Athletics Indoor Championships was held on 6 March at 18:00 (heats) and on 7 March 2015 at 19:45 (final) local time.

== Medalists ==
Gold	Silver	Bronze
Ali Kaya; Turkey	Lee Emanuel; Great Britain	Henrik Ingebrigtsen; Norway

== Results ==
=== Heats ===
Qualification: First 4 of each heat (Q) and the next 4 fastest (q) qualified for the final.

Rank	Heat	Athlete	Nationality	Time	Note
1	2	Ali Kaya	Turkey	7:45.65	Q
2	2	Adel Mechaal	Spain	7:46.92	Q, PB
3	2	Pieter-Jan Hannes	Belgium	7:47.55	Q, PB
4	2	Henrik Ingebrigtsen	Norway	7:47.83	Q, PB
5	2	Florian Carvalho	France	7:48.59	q, SB
6	2	Yegor Nikolayev	Russia	7:49.24	q
7	2	Florian Orth	Germany	7:51.16	q
8	2	Jesús España	Spain	7:51.56	q
9	1	Richard Ringer	Germany	7:52.14	Q
10	1	Lee Emanuel	Great Britain	7:52.39	Q
11	1	Philip Hurst	Great Britain	7:52.57	Q
12	1	Łukasz Parszczyński	Poland	7:52.57	Q
13	1	Carlos Alonso	Spain	7:52.82	
14	1	Halil Akkaş	Turkey	7:53.11	
15	1	Stanislav Maslov	Ukraine	7:53.13	PB
16	1	Brenton Rowe	Austria	7:53.28	
17	1	Clemens Bleistein	Germany	7:53.33	PB
18	1	Paul Pollock	Ireland	7:58.78	PB
19	1	Aleksey Popov	Russia	8:02.56	
20	1	Thijs Nijhuis	Denmark	8:04.97	
21	2	Ivan Strebkov	Ukraine	8:09.04	
22	2	Mateusz Demczyszak	Poland	8:09.30	
23	2	Tom Lancashire	Great Britain	8:10.74	
24	2	Andreas Vojta	Austria	8:20.56	
25	2	Peter Ďurec	Slovakia	8:37.93	

=== Final ===
Rank	Athlete	Nationality	Time	Note
1st place, gold medalist(s)	Ali Kaya	Turkey	7:38.42	CR, NR
2nd place, silver medalist(s)	Lee Emanuel	Great Britain	7:44.48	PB
3rd place, bronze medalist(s)	Henrik Ingebrigtsen	Norway	7:45.54	NR
4	Jesús España	Spain	7:47.12	SB
5	Richard Ringer	Germany	7:48.44	
6	Adel Mechaal	Spain	7:49.59	
7	Łukasz Parszczyński	Poland	7:50.11	SB
8	Florian Orth	Germany	7:51.02	
9	Philip Hurst	Great Britain	7:51.94	
10	Yegor Nikolayev	Russia	7:51.99	
11	Florian Carvalho	France	7:57.14	
12	Pieter-Jan Hannes	Belgium	7:59.43	
