= 2011 European Athletics Indoor Championships – Men's 3000 metres =

The Men's 3000 metres event at the 2011 European Athletics Indoor Championships was held on March 4 and 5 with the final being held on March 5 at 16:50 local time.

== Records ==
Standing records prior to the 2011 European Athletics Indoor Championships
World record	Daniel Komen (KEN)	7:24.90	Budapest, Hungary	6 February 1998
European record	Sergio Sánchez (ESP)	7:32.41	Valencia, Spain	13 February 2010
Championship record	Mo Farah (GBR)	7:40.17	Madrid, Spain	7 March 2009
World Leading	Alamirew Yenew (ETH)	7:27.80	Stuttgart, Germany	5 February 2011
European Leading	Mo Farah (GBR)	7:35.81	Boston, United States	5 February 2011

== Results ==
=== Heats ===
First 3 in each heat and 3 best performers advance to the Final. The heats were held at 11:15.

==== Heat 1 ====
Rank	Heat	Name	Nationality	Time	Notes
1	2	Hayle Ibrahimov	Azerbaijan	8:00.36	Q
2	2	Florian Carvalho	France	8:00.90	Q
3	3	Yohan Durand	France	8:01.24	Q
4	3	Halil Akkas	Turkey	8:01.38	Q
5	2	Jesús España	Spain	8:01.56	Q
6	3	Andy Baddeley	Great Britain	8:01.56	Q
7	3	Stefano La Rosa	Italy	8:01.89	q
8	2	Mert Girmalegese	Turkey	8:02.12	q
9	1	Mo Farah	Great Britain	8:02.37	Q
10	3	Siarhei Platonau	Belarus	8:02.46	q
11	1	Rui Silva	Portugal	8:02.69	Q
12	1	Daniele Meucci	Italy	8:02.71	Q
13	1	Francisco Javier Alves	Spain	8:02.90	
14	2	Łukasz Parszczyński	Poland	8:03.14	
15	3	Dan Mulhare	Ireland	8:04.57	
16	2	Siarhei Chabiarak	Belarus	8:05.29	
17	1	Sergey Ivanov	Russia	8:07.27	
18	1	Mykola Labovskyi	Ukraine	8:08.17	
19	1	Nordine Gezzar	France	8:10.69	
20	3	Víctor García	Spain	8:11.31	
21	1	Bjørnar Ustad Kristensen	Norway	8:11.63	
22	3	Yegor Nikolayev	Russia	8:13.01	q*
23	2	Jonas Hamm	Finland	8:16.51	
24	2	Adil Bouafif	Sweden	8:20.69	
25	1	Sevak Yeghikyan	Armenia	8:23.83	NR
26	2	Valentin Smirnov	Russia	8:29.23	

Note: Yegor Nikolayev qualified to the final by judge decision as during his race he collided with another athlete competing in different event.

=== Final ===
The final was held at 16:50.

Rank	Name	Nationality	Time	Notes
1st place, gold medalist(s)	Mo Farah	Great Britain	7:53.00	
2nd place, silver medalist(s)	Hayle Ibrahimov	Azerbaijan	7:53.32	
3rd place, bronze medalist(s)	Halil Akkas	Turkey	7:54.19	
4	Andy Baddeley	Great Britain	7:54.49	SB
5	Jesús España	Spain	7:54.66	
6	Rui Silva	Portugal	7:59.49	
7	Yohan Durand	France	8:02.40	
8	Florian Carvalho	France	8:02.92	
9	Mert Girmalegese	Turkey	8:04.00	
10	Stefano La Rosa	Italy	8:04.12	
11	Daniele Meucci	Italy	8:04.82	
12	Yegor Nikolayev	Russia	8:05.49	
13	Siarhei Platonau	Belarus	8:09.22	
