= Athletics at the 2019 Summer Universiade – Men's 5000 metres =

2019 Men's 5000 metres for Summer Universiade

The men's 5000 metres event at the 2019 Summer Universiade was held on 11 and 13 July at the Stadio San Paolo in Naples.

== Medalists ==
Gold	Silver	Bronze
Jonas Raess; Switzerland	Yann Schrub; France	Robin Hendrix; Belgium

== Results ==
=== Heats ===
Qualification: First 5 in each heat (Q) and next 5 fastest (q) qualified for the final.

Rank	Heat	Name	Nationality	Time	Notes
1	2	Robin Hendrix	Belgium	14:08.98	Q
2	2	Kisan Narshi Tadvi	India	14:11.72	Q, PB
3	2	Daniel Canala	Australia	14:11.99	Q
4	2	Luca Noti	Switzerland	14:12.13	Q
5	2	Mike Tate	Canada	14:12.20	Q
6	2	Jakub Zemaník	Czech Republic	14:12.40	q
7	2	Jakob Abrahamsen	Denmark	14:13.98	q
8	1	Ryoji Tatezawa	Japan	14:19.84	Q
9	1	Yann Schrub	France	14:20.42	Q
10	1	Kieran Lumb	Canada	14:21.25	Q
11	2	Ahmed Muhumed	Somalia	14:21.56	q
12	1	El Hocine Zourkane	Algeria	14:21.67	Q
13	1	Jonas Raess	Switzerland	14:22.13	Q
14	1	Michael Somers	Belgium	14:23.03	q
15	1	Adne Andersen	Norway	14:30.20	q
16	2	Bruce-Lynn Damons	South Africa	14:31.31	
17	1	Colin De Young	United States	14:37.45	
18	1	Lee Jung-kook	South Korea	14:38.36	
19	1	Ajay Kumar Bind	India	14:41.36	PB
20	2	Fabian Manrique	Argentina	14:42.98	
21	1	Magnus Dewett	Denmark	14:46.46	
22	1	Leonid Latsepov	Estonia	14:50.02	
23	1	Rowhaldo Ratz	South Africa	14:52.46	
24	2	Timothy Ongom	Uganda	14:58.68	
25	1	Bernardo Maldonado	Argentina	15:10.54	
26	1	Ayanda Kunene	Eswatini	15:30.02	PB
27	2	Simon Navodnik	Slovenia	16:35.62	
	2	Abderezak Khelili	Algeria	DNF	
	2	Ashenafi Tadesse	Ethiopia	DNF	
	1	Brian Wangwe	Uganda	DQ	163.3b
	2	Maxim Răileanu	Moldova	DNS	
	2	Even Brøndbo Dahl	Norway	DNS	

=== Final ===
Official Video

Rank	Name	Nationality	Time	Notes
1st place, gold medalist(s)	Jonas Raess	Switzerland	14:03.10	
2nd place, silver medalist(s)	Yann Schrub	France	14:03.24	
3rd place, bronze medalist(s)	Robin Hendrix	Belgium	14:04.06	
4	Kieran Lumb	Canada	14:06.08	
5	Ryoji Tatezawa	Japan	14:16.63	
6	Mike Tate	Canada	14:19.65	
7	Jakub Zemaník	Czech Republic	14:20.41	
8	Adne Andersen	Norway	14:21.35	PB
9	Michael Somers	Belgium	14:22.78	
10	Luca Noti	Switzerland	14:31.39	
11	Kisan Narshi Tadvi	India	14:36.36	
12	Ahmed Muhumed	Somalia	14:41.09	
13	Daniel Canala	Australia	14:41.44	
14	Jakob Abrahamsen	Denmark	14:41.51	
	El Hocine Zourkane	Algeria	DQ	R163.3b
