= Yegor Nikolayev =

Russian runner (born 1988)

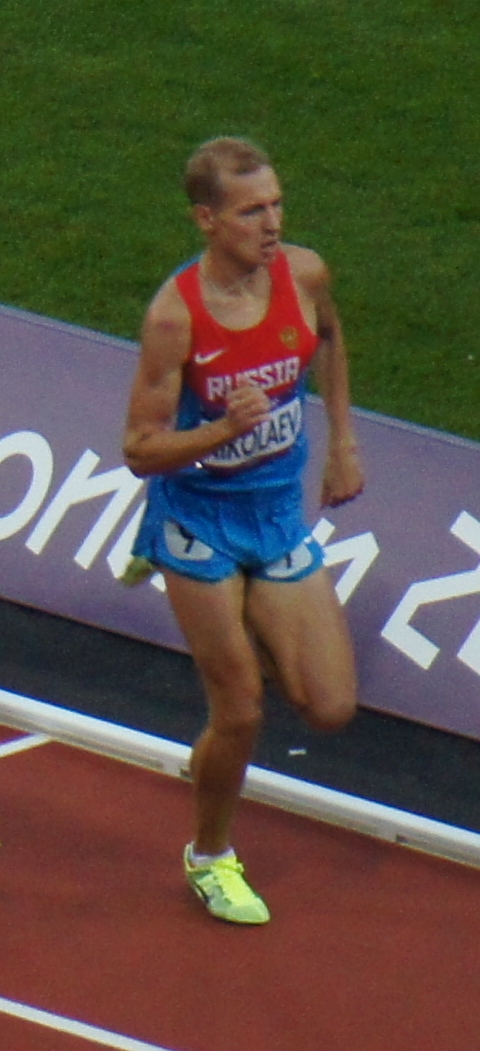
- Nikolayev at the 2012 Summer Olympics

Personal information
- Nationality: Russian
- Born: April 28, 1988 (age 38) Yekaterinburg, USSR

Sport
- Sport: Track
- Event(s): 1500 metres, 3000 metres, 5000 metres

Achievements and titles
- Personal best(s): 1500 metres: 3:37.28; 5000 metres: 13:35.33

Yegor Vladimirovich Nikolayev (Russian: Егор Владимирович Николаев; born February 12, 1988) is a Russian runner who specializes in various middle-distance and long-distance events. He represented Russia at the 2012 Summer Olympics in the 1500 m.

Nikolayev finished the 3000 metres in second overall at the 2011 European Team Championships Super League. At the 2012 Summer Olympics, Nikolayev qualified for the semifinal round of the men's 1500 metres, where he recorded a personal best time of 3:37.28. On January 8, 2014, he ran 7:51.96 in the indoor 3000 meters at the 23rd Yamalov Memorial indoor track meet in Yekaterinburg.

== International competitions ==
Year	Competition	Venue	Position	Event	Notes
Representing Russia
2011	European Indoor Championships	Paris, France	12th	3000 m	8:05.49
2011	European Team Championships	Stockholm, Sweden	2nd	3000 m	8:03.80
2012	World Indoor Championships	Istanbul, Turkey	11th (h)	1500 m	3:43.33
2013	European Indoor Championships	Gothenburg, Sweden	11th (h)	1500 m	3:43.58
2013	Universiade	Kazan, Russia	4th	1500 m	3:39.59
2015	European Indoor Championships	Prague, Czech Republic	10th	3000 m	7:51.99
2015	Universiade	Gwangju, South Korea	4th	1500 m	3:40.06
Competing as Authorised Neutral Athlete
2019	European Indoor Championships	Glasgow, United Kingdom	19th (h)	3000 m	8:00.71
