= John Travers (athlete) =

Irish middle-distance runner

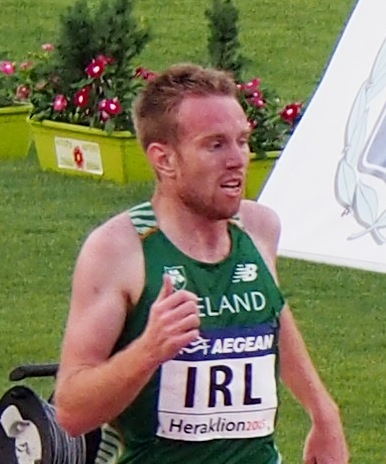
- John Travers at 2015 European Team Championships First League.

Personal information
- Born: 16 March 1991 (age 35) Dublin, Ireland
- Education: Athlone Institute of Technology
- Height: 1.78 m (5 ft 10 in)
- Weight: 58 kg (128 lb)

Sport
- Sport: Track and field
- Event: 1500 metres
- Club: Donore Harriers

John Travers (born 16 March 1991 in Dublin) is an Irish athlete competing in middle-distance events. He finished seventh in the 1500 metres at the 2015 European Indoor Championships.

== Competition record ==
Year	Competition	Venue	Position	Event	Notes
Representing Ireland
2010	World Junior Championships	Moncton, Canada	13th	5000 m	14:55.12
2011	European U23 Championships	Ostrava, Czech Republic	28th (h)	1500 m	3:54.31
2013	European Indoor Championships	Gothenburg, Sweden	20th (h)	3000 m	8:23.83
2014	European Championships	Zürich, Switzerland	27th (h)	1500 m	3:49.73
2015	European Indoor Championships	Prague, Czech Republic	7th	1500 m	3:41.50
2015	Universiade	Gwangju, South Korea	8th	1500 m	3:42.63
2017	European Indoor Championships	Belgrade, Serbia	11th	1500 m	3:53.11
2019	European Indoor Championships	Glasgow, United Kingdom	29th (h)	3000 m	8:12.54
2021	European Indoor Championships	Toruń, Poland	27th (h)	3000 m	8:05.96

== Personal bests ==
Outdoor

- 800 metres – 1:50.90 (Tullamore 2012)
- 1500 metres – 3:37.27 (Dublin 2014)
- One mile – 3:55.44 (Dublin 2014)
- 3000 metres – 7:58.51 (Dublin 2013)
- 5000 metres – 13:28.99 (oordegem 2019)
- 10,000 metres – 29:04.66 (Parliament Hill 2015)
- 3000 metres steeplechase – 9:40.30 (Tullamore 2013)

Indoor

- 800 metres – 1:51.47 (Athlone 2013)
- 1500 metres – 3:41.37 (Prague 2015)
- One mile – 3:59.62 (New York 2015)
- 3000 metres – 7:50 (abbotstown 2021)
