= Athletics at the 2015 Summer Universiade – Men's 1500 metres =

The men's 1500 metres event at the 2015 Summer Universiade was held on 8 and 10 July at the Gwangju Universiade Main Stadium.

== Medalists ==
Gold	Silver	Bronze
Aleksey Kharitonov; Russia	Abdelali Razyn; Morocco	Staffan Ek; Sweden

== Results ==
=== Heats ===
Qualification: First 3 in each heat (Q) and next 3 fastest (q) qualified for the semifinals.

Rank	Heat	Name	Nationality	Time	Notes
1	3	Yegor Nikolayev	Russia	3:44.28	Q
2	3	John Travers	Ireland	3:44.48	Q
3	3	Guillaume Adam	France	3:44.75	Q
4	3	Levent Ateş	Turkey	3:44.75	q
5	3	Abdelali Razyn	Morocco	3:44.94	q, PB
6	3	Andreas Vojta	Austria	3:45.01	q, SB
7	3	Anders Lindahl	Finland	3:45.10	SB
8	3	Hans Kristian Fløystad	Norway	3:46.77	
9	3	Peter Glans	Denmark	3:47.40	PB
10	2	Aleksey Kharitonov	Russia	3:52.07	Q
11	2	Robert Denault	Canada	3:52.55	Q
12	2	Karl Robertson	Estonia	3:52.91	Q
13	2	James Hansen	Australia	3:53.14	
14	3	Adrian Plummer	Australia	3:54.33	
15	1	Staffan Ek	Sweden	3:54.57	Q
16	1	Andries Hlaselo	South Africa	3:55.12	Q
17	1	Andreas Lommer	Denmark	3:55.32	Q
18	1	Allar Lamp	Estonia	3:55.78	
19	1	Mitja Krevs	Slovenia	3:56.14	SB
20	1	Austin O'Neil	United States	3:56.52	
21	2	Awwad Al-Sharafat	Jordan	3:57.71	
22	2	Zelalem Yihunie	Ethiopia	3:58.33	
23	2	Festus Bett	Kenya	3:58.99	
24	1	Ahmed Ali Al-Aamri	Oman	4:03.55	
25	3	Simiso Nzima	Swaziland	4:05.26	
26	1	Liu Bao	China	4:07.57	
27	2	Vegard Ølstad	Norway	4:08.78	
28	2	Bal Al-Hamhami	Oman	4:09.63	
29	3	Fang Jianyong	Singapore	4:09.76	
30	1	Elhassen Derbali	Algeria	4:13.28	
31	2	Seiya Eda	Northern Mariana Islands	4:58.12	
32	2	Ismael Mebale Me Nang	Gabon	5:06.08	
	1	Ariel Méndez	Chile	DNF	
	1	Allen Eke	Nigeria	DNS	
	1	Stephane Kibambe	Democratic Republic of the Congo	DNS	
	2	Michael Bangura	Sierra Leone	DNS	

=== Final ===
Official Video

Rank	Name	Nationality	Time	Notes
1st place, gold medalist(s)	Aleksey Kharitonov	Russia	3:39.13	PB
2nd place, silver medalist(s)	Abdelali Razyn	Morocco	3:39.20	PB
3rd place, bronze medalist(s)	Staffan Ek	Sweden	3:39.68	PB
4	Yegor Nikolayev	Russia	3:40.06	SB
5	Robert Denault	Canada	3:41.13	
6	Andries Hlaselo	South Africa	3:42.40	
7	Guillaume Adam	France	3:42.62	SB
8	John Travers	Ireland	3:42.63	
9	Karl Robertson	Estonia	3:46.13	PB
10	Andreas Vojta	Austria	3:54.58	
11	Andreas Lommer	Denmark	3:56.04	
	Levent Ateş	Turkey	DQ	R163.2
