= Roberto Aláiz =

Spanish long-distance runner

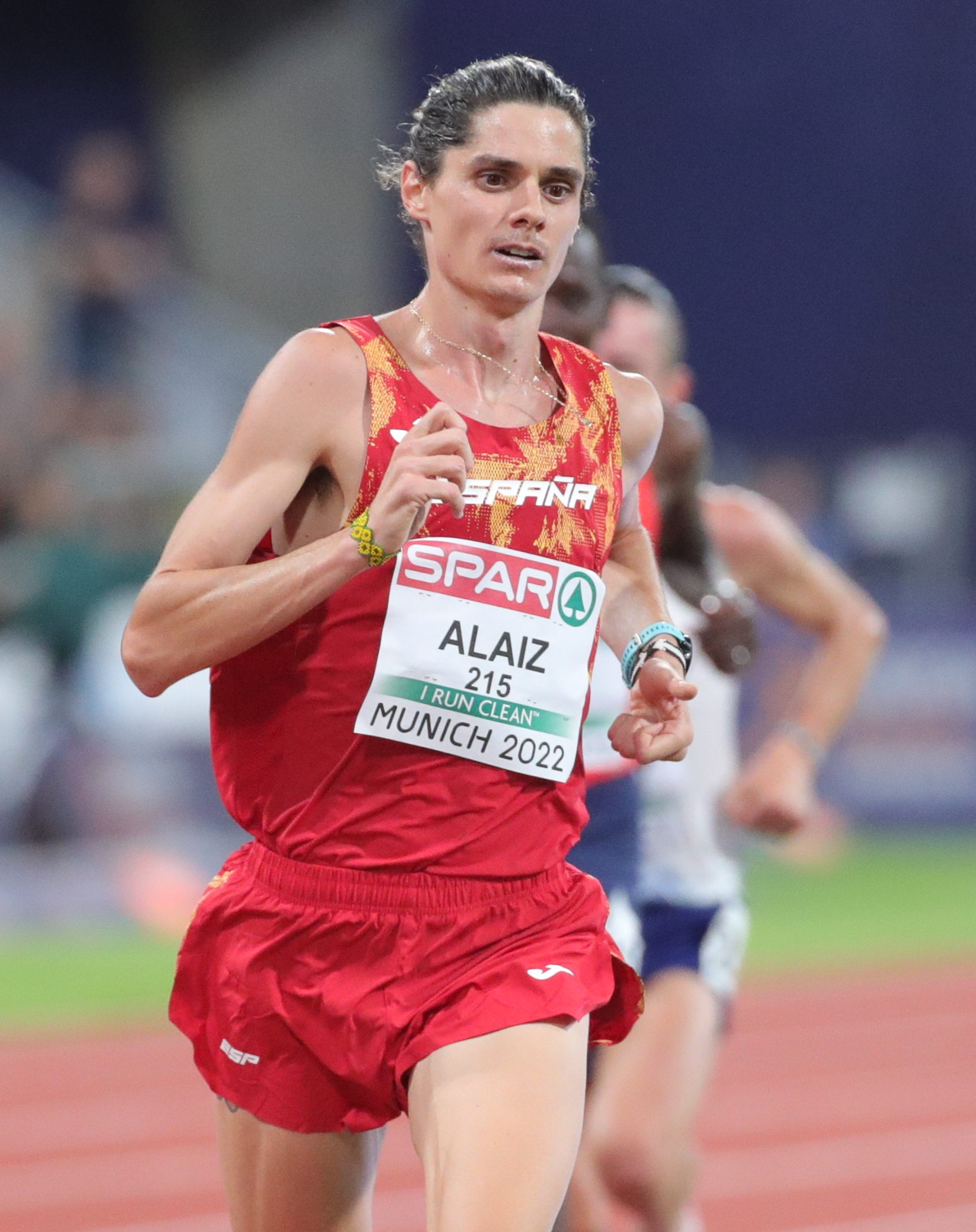
- Roberto Aláiz at the 2022 European Championships

Personal information
- Born: 20 July 1990 (age 35) León, Spain
- Height: 1.82 m (6 ft 0 in)
- Weight: 63 kg (139 lb)

Sport
- Sport: Track and field
- Event(s): 3000 m steeplechase, 5000 m
- Club: C.D. Nike Running
- Coached by: José Enrique Villacorta
- Updated on 29 August 2015

Roberto Aláiz Villacorta (born 20 July 1990, in León) is a male Spanish long-distance runner. He competed in the 3000 metres steeplechase event at the 2013 World Championships. He also competed in the 3000 metres steeplechase event at the 2015 World Championships in Beijing but did not finish.

== Competition record ==
Year	Competition	Venue	Position	Event	Notes
Representing Spain
2009	European Junior Championships	Novi Sad, Serbia	12th	3000 m s'chase	9:29.84
2011	European U23 Championships	Ostrava, Czech Republic	5th	5000 m	14:24.62
2013	European Indoor Championships	Gothenburg, Sweden	7th	3000 m	7:55.12
2013	Mediterranean Games	Mersin, Turkey	8th	3000 m s'chase	8:42.61
2013	World Championships	Moscow, Russia	26th (h)	3000 m s'chase	8:33.32
2014	European Championships	Zurich, Switzerland	5th	5000 m	14:11.47
2014	European Cross Country Championships	Samokov, Bulgaria	13th	10 km race	
2015	World Championships	Beijing, China	–	3000 m s'chase	DNF
2015	European Cross Country Championships	Hyères, France	7th	10 km race	30:20
2022	European Championships	Munich, Germany	14th	10,000 m	28:14.86

== Personal bests ==
Outdoor

- 1500 metres – 3:43.26 (Madrid 2014)
- 3000 metres – 7:48.82 (Los Corrales de Buelna 2015)
- 5000 metres – 14:11.47 (Zürich 2014)
- 10,000 metres – 28:27.76 (Lisbon 2014)
- 3000 metres steeplechase – 8:19.85 (Eugene 2015)

Indoor

- 1500 metres – 3:45.67 (Oviedo 2013)
- 3000 metres – 7:51.5 (Valencia 2015)
