= Hélio Gomes =

Portuguese middle-distance runner

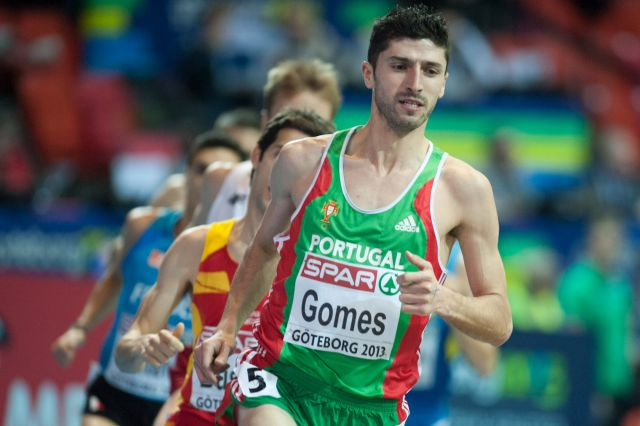
Hélio Gomes at the 2013 European Indoor Championships

Hélio Gomes (born 27 December 1984) is a Portuguese athlete specializing in the 1500 metres. In July 2017, the now Sporting CP athlete tested positive for doping.

== Competition record ==
Year	Competition	Venue	Position	Event	Notes
Representing Portugal
2003	European Junior Championships	Tampere, Finland	23rd (h)	800 m	1:54.36
2009	Universiade	Belgrade, Serbia	10th	1500 m	3:45.48
2009	Lusophony Games	Lisbon, Portugal	2nd	1500 m	3:48.91
2011	European Indoor Championships	Paris, France	20th (h)	1500 m	3:49.22
2012	European Championships	Helsinki, Finland	4th	1500 m	3:46.50
2013	European Indoor Championships	Gothenburg, Sweden	6th	1500 m	3:39.46
2015	World Championships	Beijing, China	38th (h)	1500 m	3:46.32
2016	European Championships	Amsterdam, Netherlands	34th (h)	1500 m	3:46.66

== Personal bests ==
Outdoor

- 800 metres – 1:49.60 (Cáceres 2006)
- 1500 metres – 3:38.49 (Mataró 2012)

Indoor

- 800 metres – 1:49.63 (Espinho 2005)
- 1500 metres – 3:39.46 (Gothenburg 2013)

== See also ==
- List of doping cases in sport
