= Andrew Butchart =

British runner (born 1991)

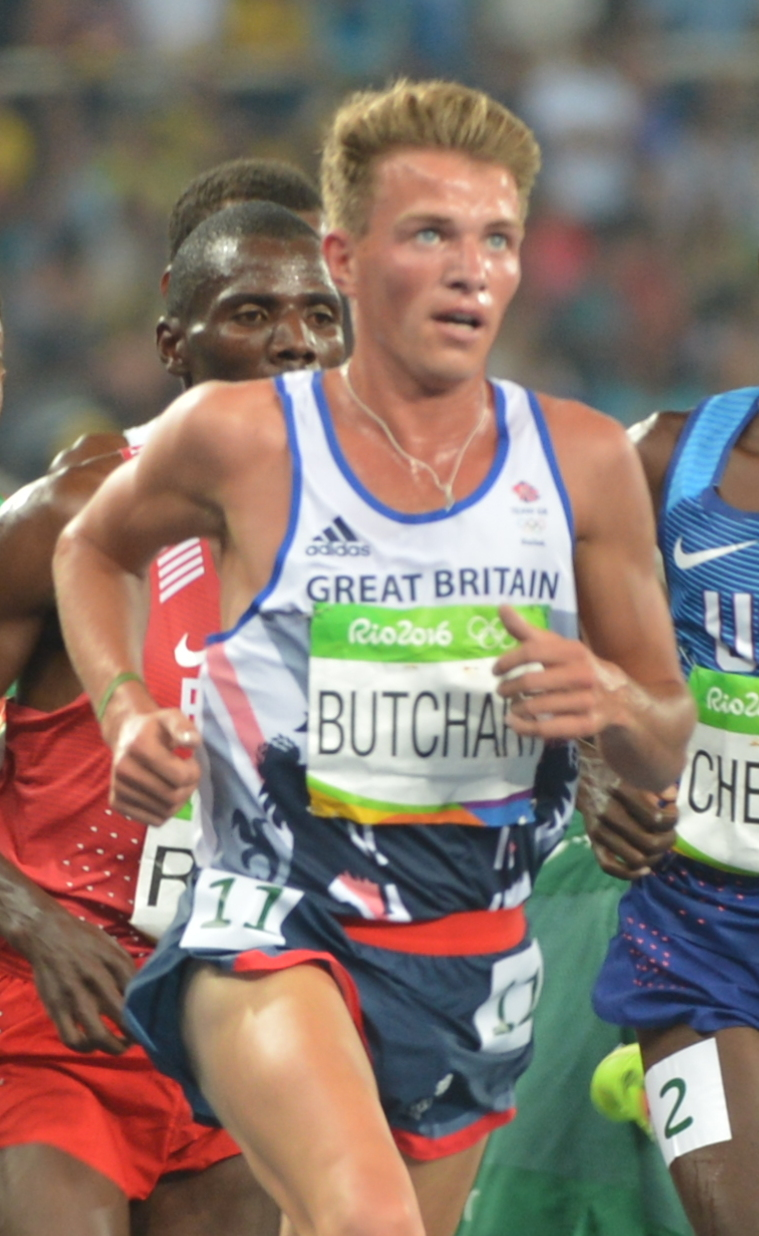
- Butchart at the 2016 Olympics

Personal information
- Nationality: British
- Born: Andrew Butchart; 14 October 1991 (age 35) Stirling, Scotland
- Occupation: Runner
- Years active: 2015–present

Sport
- Sport: Long-distance running
- Events: 3000 m, 5000 m, 10,000 m, cross country
- Club: Central Athletic Club, Stirling

Achievements and titles
- Personal bests: 3000 m – 7:35.18 NR (2021); 5000 m – 13:06.21 NR (2019); 10000 m – 27:36.77 NR (2022)

Andrew Butchart (born 14 October 1991) is a British runner who competed in the 5000 metres event at the 2016 and 2020 Summer Olympics. He is the current Scottish record holder in the 3000, 5000 and 10,000 metre events. In June 2023, he broke the parkrun world record.

== Career ==
Butchart has trained at the Central Athletic Club in Stirling. At the age of 16, Butchart came third in the Scottish schools cross-country championships. He won the 2014 Age UK Leeds Abbey Dash. Butchart won his first professional race in the 5000 metres event at the 2015 Scottish Seniors Championships; he also finished second in the 1,500 metres race. In June 2015, Butchart was selected for the European 10,000m Cup despite having never previously run a 10,000m race on a track, and also finished third in the 3000 metres event at the European Team Championships in Moscow. In November he won the Scottish Short Course Cross County Championships.

Butchart became a full-time athlete at the beginning of 2016, leaving a fitness coaching job based at Gleneagles Hotel. In February 2016, Butchart won the Scottish Cross Country Championships, and in May, Butchart broke Nat Muir's Scottish record in the 5000 metres event at the Fanny Blankers-Koen Games. His time was 13:13.30, four seconds quicker than Muir's record, which had stood for 36 years, and Butchart ran the last lap of the race with only one shoe. In June 2016, Butchart broke the Scottish 3000 metre record at the IAAF Diamond League meeting in Birmingham; Butchart recorded a time of 7:45:00, less than a second quicker than John Robson's record from 1984. In the same race, Mo Farah broke the British 3000 metre record. Later in the month, he won the 5000 metres event at the British Championships, meaning that he qualified for the 5000 metres event at the 2016 Summer Olympics.

Butchart was the third athlete from the small town of Dunblane to qualify for the 2016 Summer Olympics, after brothers Andy and Jamie Murray. Butchart qualified for the 5000 metre Olympic final, after finishing fifth in his heat in a time of 13:20.08, and finished sixth in the final, recording a personal best time of 13:08.61. (Note: Butchart originally finished seventh, but was awarded sixth place after the disqualification of Muktar Edris.) In 2016, he also won the London 10,000 race.

Butchart won a bronze medal at the 2017 European Cross Country Championships. Butchart was scheduled to compete at the 2018 Commonwealth Games in Gold Coast, Australia, but later had to withdraw due to a broken foot. Butchart led the British team at the 2019 European Cross Country Championships. He qualified for the final at the 2019 World Athletics Championships, after Norwegian Jakob Ingebrigtsen was disqualified in the semi-finals. In February 2021, Butchart was warned by British Athletics for criticising his coach on social media in September 2019. In March 2021, he reached the final in the men's 3000 metres event at the 2021 European Athletics Indoor Championships held in Toruń, Poland.

Butchart qualified for the 5,000 metres event at the delayed 2020 Summer Olympics after coming second at the 2021 British Athletics Championships. On 29 June 2021, UK Athletics said that they were investigating claims that Butchart faked a COVID-19 test to get entry to the United Kingdom for the Championships. On 17 July, he was given a 12-month suspended ban, which meant he could still compete at the Olympics. At the Games, Butchart finished 11th in the final. In October 2021, Butchart's funding from The National Lottery was cut due to the pre-Olympics COVID-19 test incident.

In March 2022, Butchart set a Scottish national record time of 27:36.77 in the 10,000 metres event, during his first competition at the distance. In July 2022, he was selected for the Scottish team for the 2022 Commonwealth Games, to compete in the 5000 and 10,000 metres events. He finished seventh in the 10,000 metres event.

In May 2023, Butchart became British champion in the 10,000 metres event, after being the highest finishing Briton at the Night of the 10k PBs event. In June, he set the record for the fastest ever Parkrun time, finishing the Edinburgh parkrun 5,000 metres event in 13:45, which was 3 seconds faster than the previous record that had been held by Andy Baddeley for 11 years.

== Personal life ==
Butchart lived in Dunblane, Scotland, the same town as Andy and Jamie Murray. He now lives with his partner and fellow runner Lynsey Sharp in San Diego, US. In October 2019, the couple announced their engagement. In 2021, Butchart and Sharp had their first child, Max.
