= Florian Carvalho =

French middle-distance runner

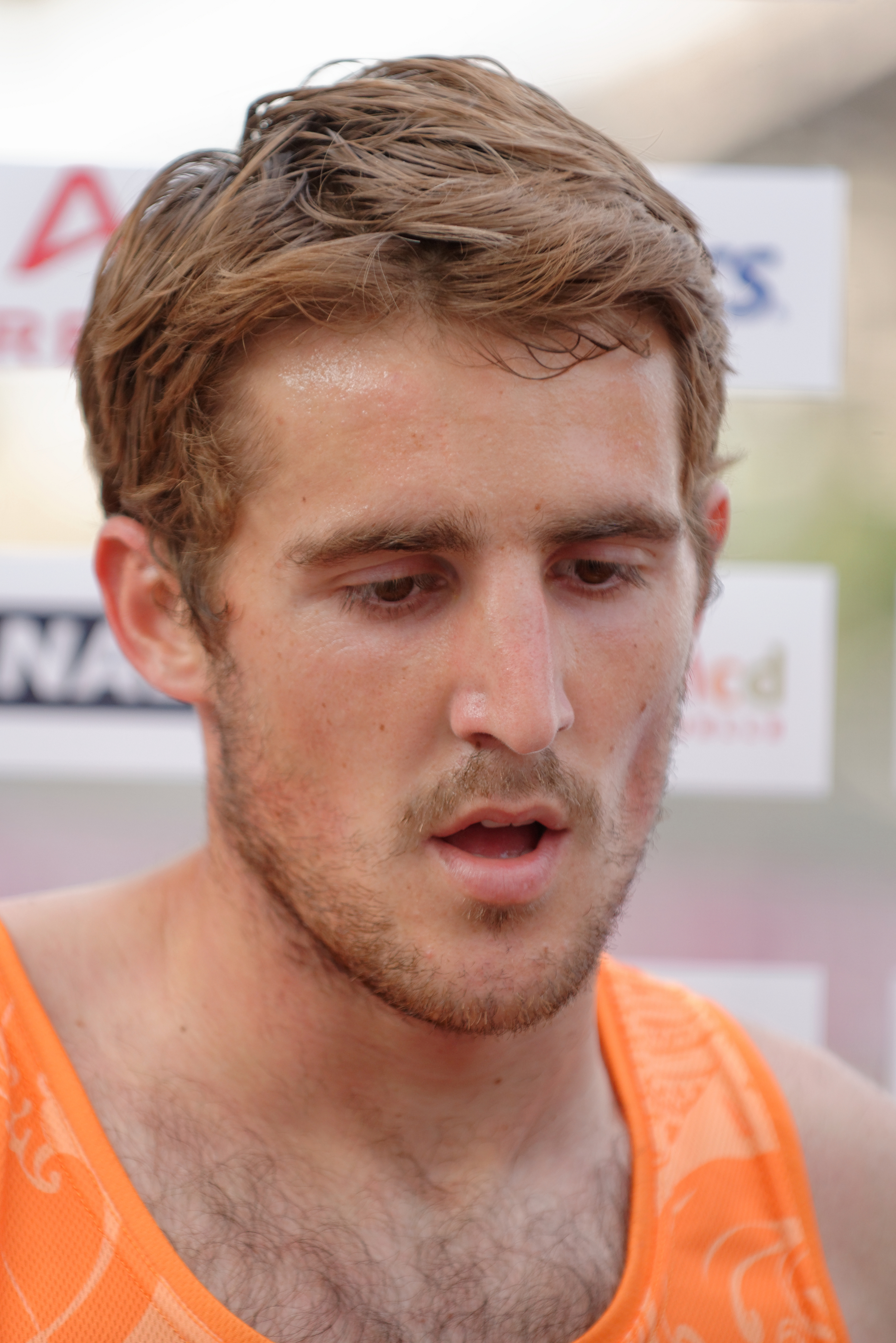
- Carvalho in 2013

Personal information
- Full name: Florian Carvalho de Fonseco
- Born: 9 March 1989 (age 37) Fontainebleau, France
- Height: 183 cm (6 ft 0 in)
- Weight: 70 kg (154 lb)
Medal record
Men's athletics
Representing France
European Athletics Championships
Silver medal – second place	2012 Helsinki	1500 m
European Cross Country Championships
Silver medal – second place	2015 Hyères	Team

Florian Carvalho de Fonseco (born 9 March 1989 in Fontainebleau) is a French middle-distance runner. He competed in the men's 1500 m at the 2012 and 2016 Olympics.

== International competitions ==
Year	Competition	Venue	Position	Event	Notes
Representing France
2006	World Junior Championships	Beijing, China	18th (sf)	800m	1:49.98
2008	World Junior Championships	Bydgoszcz, Poland	7th	1500 m	3:49.48
2011	European Indoor Championships	Paris, France	8th	3000 m	8:02.92
2011	European U23 Championships	Ostrava, Czech Republic	1st	1500 m	3:50.42
2012	European Championships	Helsinki, Finland	2nd	1500 m	3:46.33
2013	European Indoor Championships	Gothenburg, Sweden	5th	3000 m	7:53.23
2013	World Championships	Moscow, Russia	11th	1500 m	3:39.17
2014	European Championships	Zürich, Switzerland	15th (h)	1500 m	3:40.39
2015	European Indoor Championships	Prague, Czech Republic	11th	3000 m	7:57.14
2016	European Championships	Amsterdam, Netherlands	5th	1500 m	3:47.32
2016	Olympic Games	Rio de Janeiro, Brazil	21st (h)	1500 m	3:41.87
2018	European Championships	Berlin, Germany	12th	5000 m	13:28.08
2018	European Championships	Berlin, Germany	8th	10,000 m	28:29.78
2022	European Championships	Munich, Germany	52nd	Marathon	2:21:51
