= Jeroen D'hoedt =

Belgian middle-distance runner

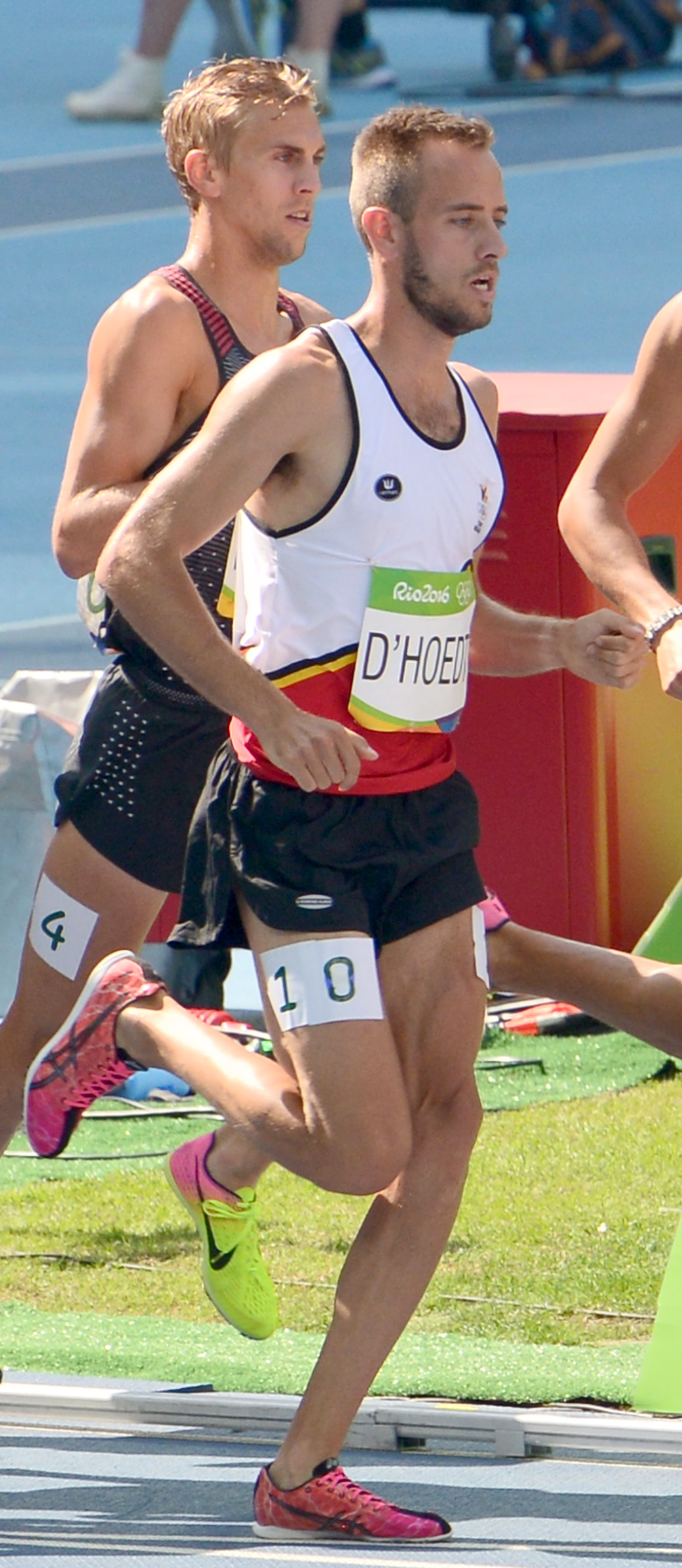
- D'hoedt at the 2016 Olympics

Personal information
- Born: 10 January 1990 (age 36)
- Education: Katholieke Universiteit Leuven
- Height: 183 cm (6 ft 0 in)
- Weight: 63 kg (139 lb)
- Website: http://www.jeroendhoedt.be

Sport
- Sport: Athletics
- Event: 800–5000 m steeplechase
- Club: CA Brabant Wallon; Olympic Essenbeek Halle
- Coached by: Dirk De Maesschalck

Achievements and titles
- Personal bests: 800 m – 1:47.22 (2011); 1500 m – 3:36.07 (2011); 3000 m – 7:53.36 (2016); 3000 mS – 8:30.03 (2015); 5000 m – 13:34.90 (2014)

Jeroen D'hoedt (also D'Hoedt, born 10 January 1990) is a middle-distance runner from Belgium. At the 2013 European Cross Country Championships he was about to win a bronze medal, but Andy Vernon edged him out in a fast finishing sprint, clocking the same time of 29:35 as D'hoedt. He competed in the 3000 metres steeplechase at the 2016 Olympics, but failed to reach the final.
