= Craig Huffer =

Australian sub-4 minute miler (born 1989)

Craig David Huffer
Personal information
- Nationality: Australian
- Born: October 27, 1989 (age 35)

Sport
- Sport: Athletics
- Club: Very Nice Track Club
- Coached by: Ron Warhurst

Craig David Huffer (born 27 October 1989) is an Australian sub-4 minute miler.

Before signing with Adams State, Huffer won National All Schools titles over the 800 metres and represented Australia at the World Junior Championships in Bydgoszcz, Poland.

In 2008 as an 18-year-old Huffer won the Leonara Golden Gift, the richest mile race in Australia.

In 2009 as a 19-year-old Huffer placed 3rd at the 2009 Australian Athletics Championships in Brisbane, and recorded 3:39.98 at the Sydney Track Classic to rank the fourth fastest Australian junior at the time over the 1500 metres.

In 2010 he became the 47th ever Australian to run a sub-4 mile in Nashville, USA, and went on to run a 1500 metres personal best of 3:36.35 at the Reunion Internacional Ciudad de Barcelona, to rank 16th on the all-time Australian senior list.

In October 2011 Huffer joined the Very Nice Track Club to train under Ron Warhurst. The following Autumn he finished fourth in the Fifth Avenue Mile in 3:53.5.
