= Víctor Corrales =

Spanish middle-distance runner

Personal information
- Born: 12 March 1989 (age 36)

Sport
- Sport: Track and field
- Event: 1500 metres

Víctor José Corrales Vaquero (born 12 March 1989) is a Spanish middle-distance runner competing primarily in the 1500 metres. He represented his country at the 2015 World Championships in Beijing without advancing from the first round.

== Competition record ==
Year	Competition	Venue	Position	Event	Notes
Representing Spain
2007	European Junior Championships	Hengelo, Netherlands	2nd	1500 m	4:01.44
2008	World Junior Championships	Bydgoszcz, Poland	30th (h)	1500 m	3:58.29
2009	European U23 Championships	Kaunas, Lithuania	16th (h)	1500 m	3:47.14
2015	World Championships	Beijing, China	33rd (h)	1500 m	3:44.76
2016	Ibero-American Championships	Rio de Janeiro, Brazil	3rd	1500 m	3:39.20

== Personal bests ==
Outdoor

- 800 metres – 1:48.12 (Madrid 2013)
- 1500 metres – 3:37.70 (Mataró 2015)

Indoor

- 1500 metres – 3:45.45 (Sabadell 2014)
