= Ciarán Ó Lionáird =

Irish runner (1988–2026)

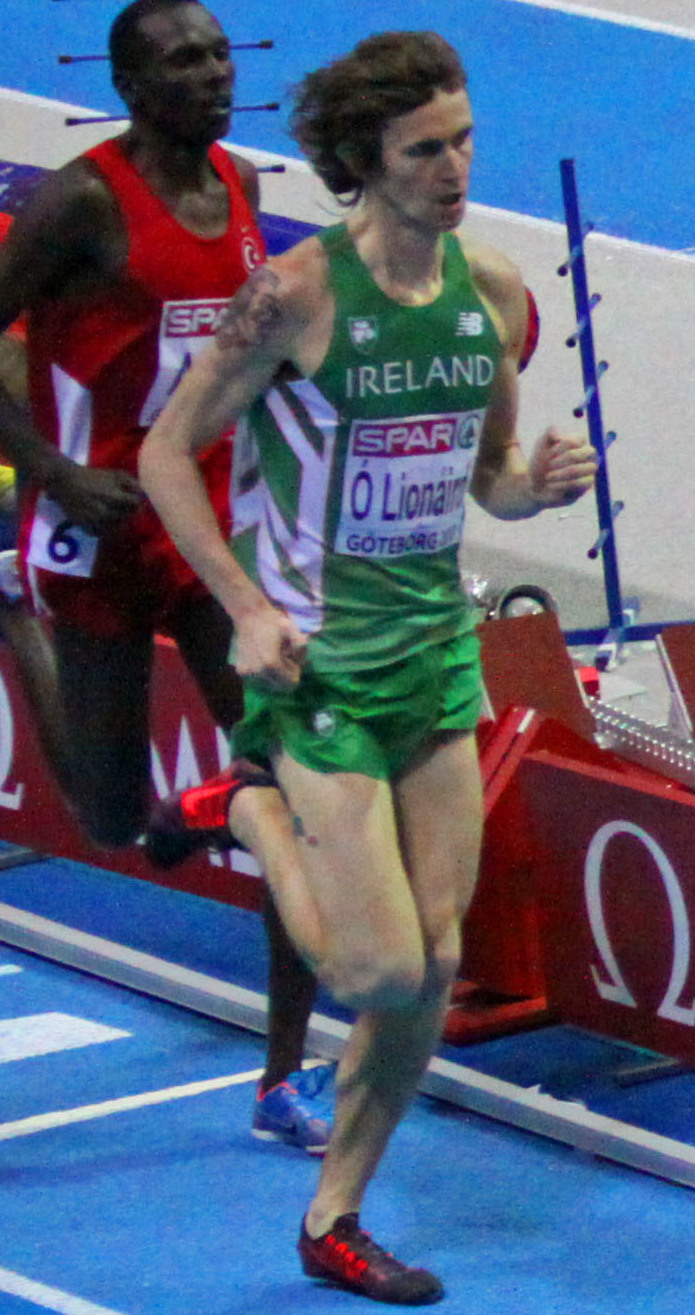
- Ó Lionáird in 2013

Personal information
- Nationality: Irish
- Born: 11 April 1988 Cork, Ireland
- Died: 9 June 2026 (aged 38) Montreal, Quebec, Canada
- Height: 6 ft 2 in (1.88 m)
- Weight: 137 lb (62 kg)

Sport
- Sport: Track and field
- Event: Middle-distance running
- College team: Michigan Wolverines '09, Florida State Seminoles '11
- Club: Nike Oregon Track Club Elite
- Turned pro: 2011

Achievements and titles
- Personal bests: 1500 m: 3:34.46; 1 Mile: 3:52.10; 3000 m: 7:50.40; 5000 m: 13:33
Medal record
Men's athletics
Representing Ireland
European Indoor Championships
Bronze medal – third place	2013 Göteborg	3000 m

Ciarán Ó Lionáird (11 April 1988 – 9 June 2026) was an Irish runner from County Cork. He competed at the 2012 Summer Olympics in the 1500 metres. He earned a bronze medal at the 2013 European Athletics Indoor Championships in the 3000 metres.

== Early years ==
Ciaran Ó Lionáird grew up in Toonsbridge, just outside Macroom, County Cork, Ireland. He attended De La Salle College in Macroom, where he was an Irish schools 1500 metre champion. Ó Lionáird first took up running at age seven with West Muskerry AC, but at age 12 joined Leevale AC to become coached by Der O'Donovan. It was at Leevale that Ó Lionáird improved his times and ran an Irish youth indoor record of 3:50 at age 16. He went on to win a bronze medal at the European Youth Olympic Festival in Lignano, Italy, in 2005 as well as taking 10th place at the World Youth Championships, both over the metric mile.

== NCAA ==
In 2006, having finished secondary school, Ó Lionáird decided to take up a scholarship at the University of Michigan under coach Ron Warhurst where he earned Academic All-Big Ten Conference three years in 2006, 2007, and 2008. After numerous season-ending injuries (osteitis pubis, L5 disc herniation, hip bursitis) he decided to transfer to Florida State University in 2009. A recurrence of Ó Lionáird's back disc injury in 2010 led to six months on the sidelines and with surgery imminent, he thought his running career might well be over. However, he battled through a summer of intense therapy and came back in the autumn of 2010 to become All American at the NCAA Men's Division I Cross Country Championship.

== Post-college career ==
At the 2011 IAAF World Championships in Daegu, Ó Lionáird qualified through a tactical first round of the 1500 metres, then ran 3:36 in the semi-final to qualify for the IAAF World Championship final in his first major championship appearance. In the final, he placed 10th. He ran 3:50.12 at the 2012 IAAF World Indoor Championships and placed 11th in his heat. He competed in the 1500 metres at the 2012 Summer Olympics in London, but he did not advance to semi-final. Ó Lionáird ran 7:50.40 in the 3000 metres at the 2013 European Athletics Indoor Championships and earned a bronze medal. He was named Athlete of the Meet at the 2014 Irish Athletics Championships after winning the 1500 metres in 3:43.80. He advanced to the final at the 2014 European Athletics Championships, but did not finish the race after falling at the 800-metre mark. Struggling with injuries, Ó Lionáird retired from running in 2016 at age 28 after two surgeries on his Achilles tendon.

Following the COVID-19 lockdown, Ó Lionáird announced his intention to come out of retirement and compete in the 2020 Summer Olympics in Tokyo, but illness precluded these plans. Outside of running, in his post-athletics career he also worked for Nike and for Vizio in various roles including project management and digital marketing.

== Death ==
On the morning of 9 June 2026, Ó Lionáird was found dead in Vancouver, Canada, at the age of 38. His funeral took place in Inchigeelagh, County Cork.
