= Nikolai Vedehin =

Estonian athletics competitor

Nikolai Vedehin (born 9 October 1985) is an Estonian athletics competitor.

He was born in Sillamäe.

He started his athletics exercising in 2001, coached by Jevgeni Terentjev. 2004-2013 his coach was Harry Lemberg.

He is multiple-times Estonian champion in different running disciplines.

Vedehin was tested positive for the prohibited substance trimetazidine in an out of competition test in Eldoret on 5 February 2015. He was initially given a four-year ban, which was later reduced to two years, because it was ruled that he did not intentionally take the substance.

Records:

- 800 m: 1.48,48 (2011)
- 1000 m: 2.21,18 (2007)
- 1500 m: 3.41,83 (2009)
- 1 mile: 3.59,93 (2012)
- half marathon: 1:03.50 (2014)
