= Sports in Puerto Rico =

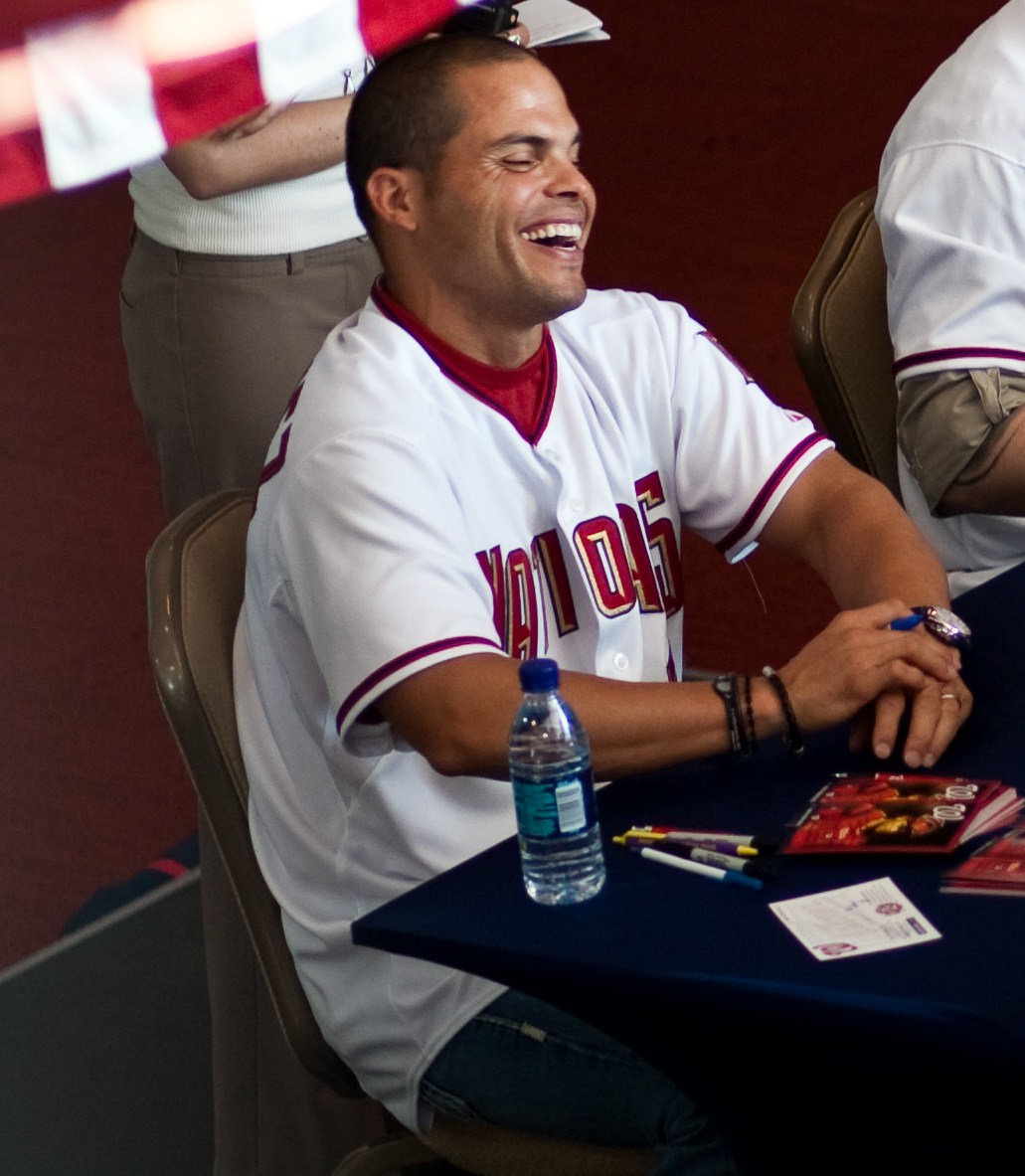
Iván Rodríguez

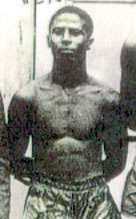
Juan Evangelista Venegas

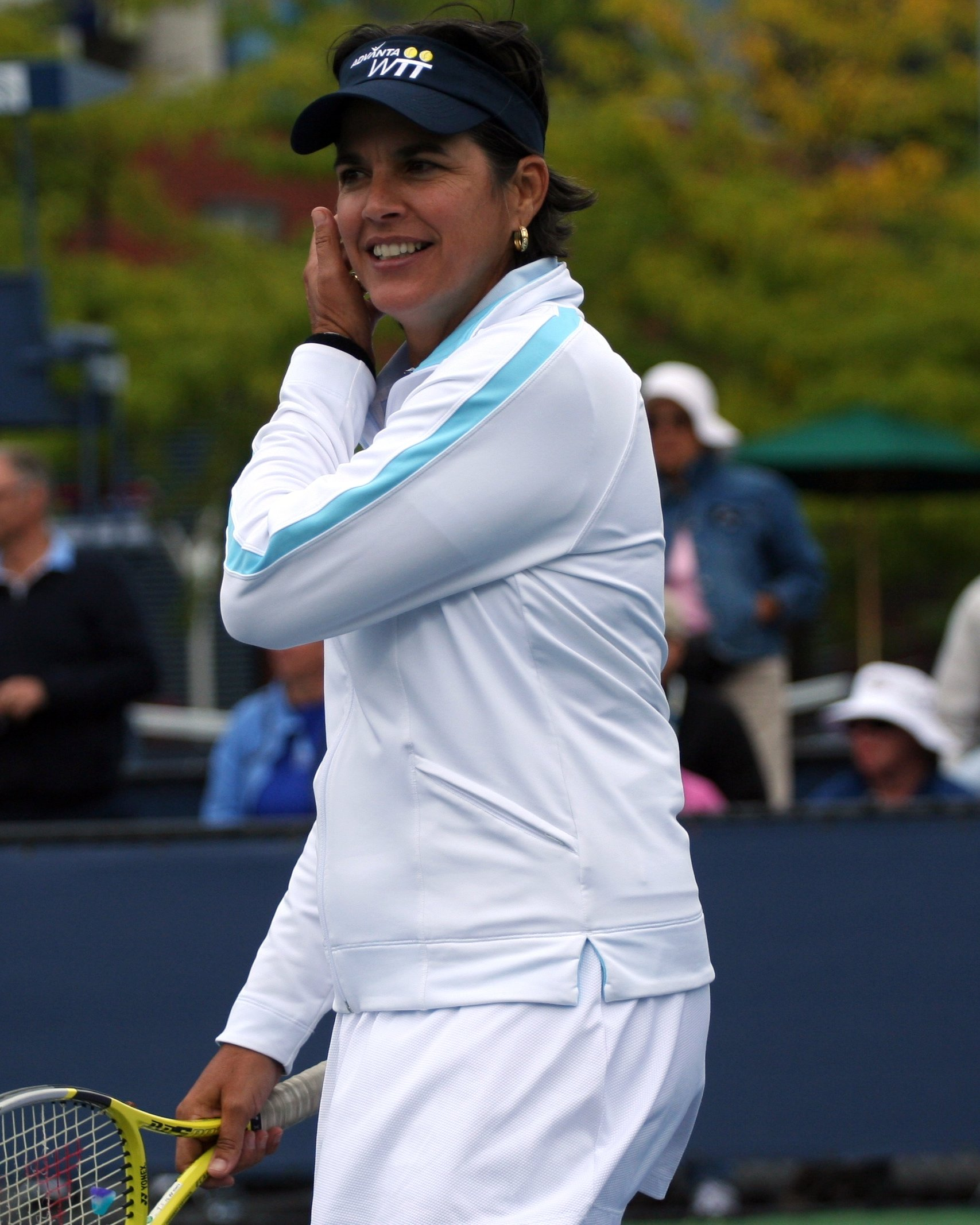
Gigi Fernández

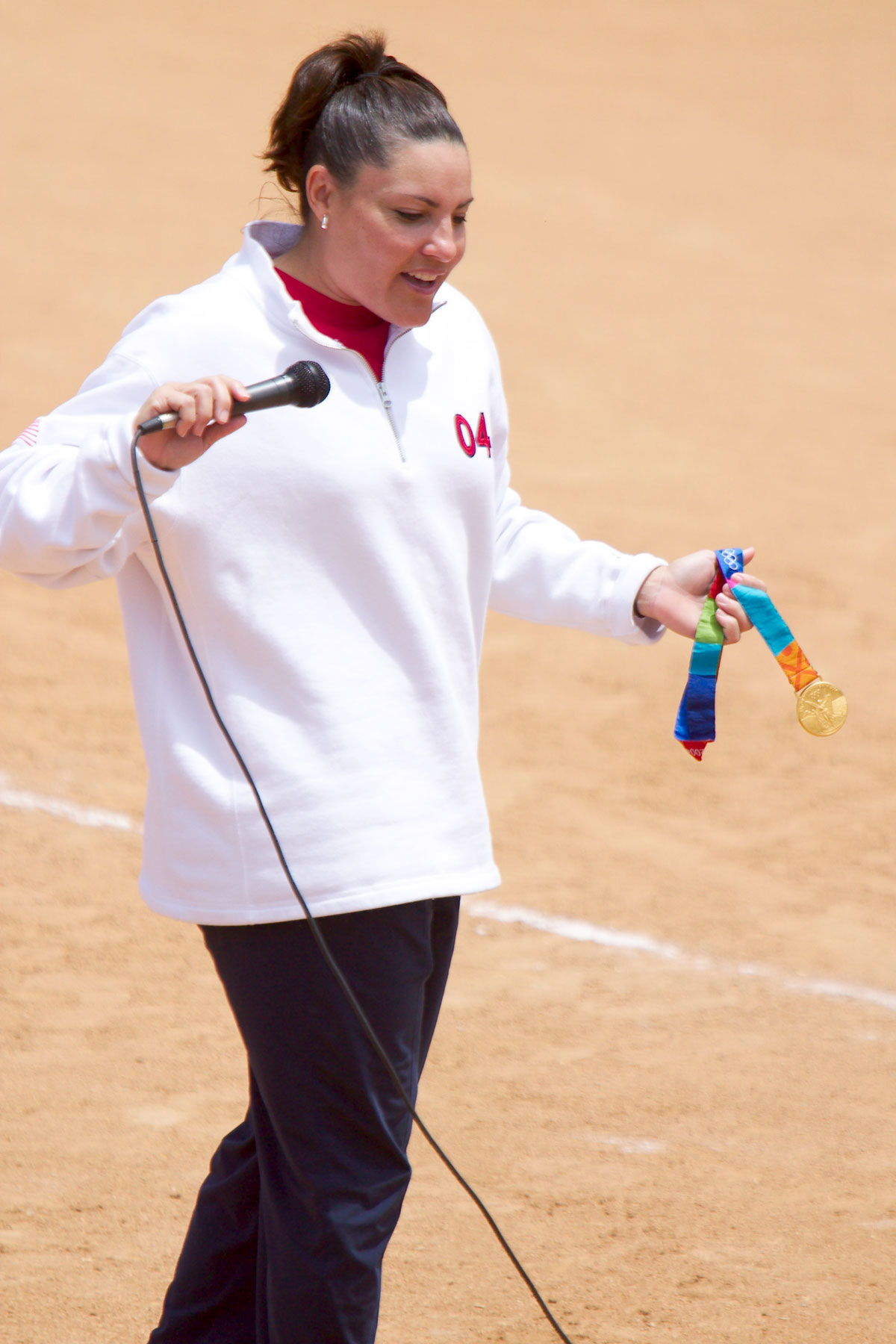
Lisa Fernandez

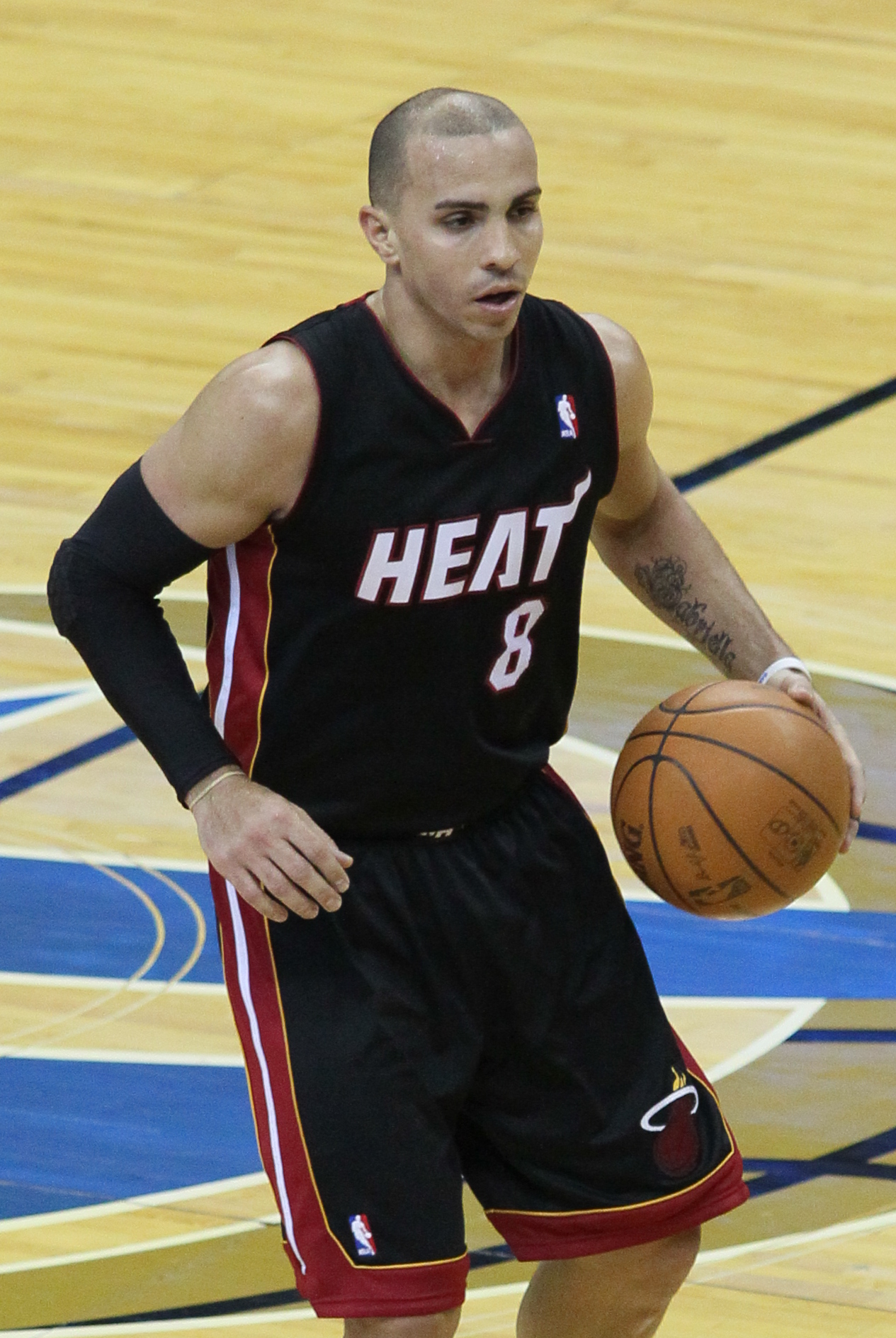
Carlos Arroyo

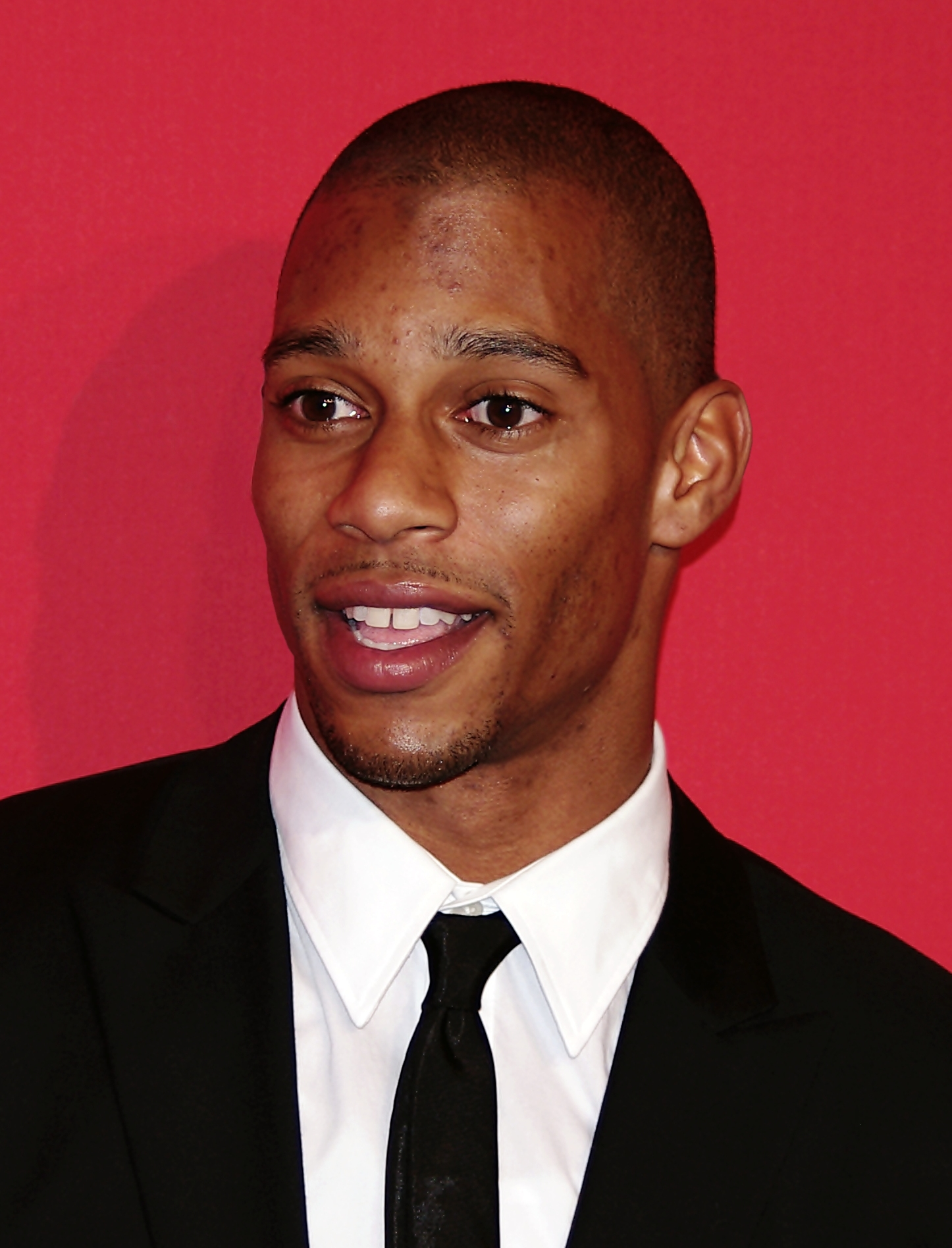
Victor Cruz

Sports in Puerto Rico can be traced from the ceremonial competitions amongst the pre-Columbian Native Americans of the Arawak (Taíno) tribes who inhabited the island to the modern era in which sports activities consist of an organized physical activity or skill carried out with a recreational purpose for competition. One of the sports which the Taíno's played was a ball game called "Batey". The "Batey" was played in U-shaped fields two teams; however, unlike the ball games of the modern era, the winners were treated like heroes and the losers were sacrificed.

The Spanish Conquistadores who conquered the island introduced various sports such as horse racing, cockfighting, dominoes and a game similar to "Bowling" called "Boliche". The Spaniards however did not participate in team sports.

Spain ceded Puerto Rico to the United States as a result of their defeat in the 1898 Spanish–American War. American soldiers who organized games as part of their training introduced the sport of boxing and basketball to the people of Puerto Rico. The sport of baseball, which was invented in the United States, was introduced to the island by a group of Puerto Ricans and Cubans who learned the sport in the United States.

Puerto Rico participates in the Olympics as an independent nation even though it is a territory of the United States. Puerto Rico has participated as such since the 1948 Summer Olympics celebrated in London. On 2 March 1917, Puerto Ricans became citizens of the United States as a result of the enactment of the Jones–Shafroth Act (Pub.L. 64–368, 39 Stat. 951) and as such Puerto Ricans who resided in the United States mainland were and still are permitted to participate and represent that country in international sports events. However, their achievements representing the United States are part of the intertwined history of sports in the United States and Puerto Rico.

The following is the list and history of the most common sports practiced in Puerto Rico and other countries and of the Puerto Ricans or people of Puerto Rican descent who have excelled in those sports locally and/or in international events as representatives of Puerto Rico or any other country.

== Brief history of sports in Puerto Rico ==
=== Pre-Columbian era ===
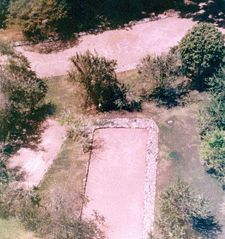
View of the Indigenous ballparks in the Tibes

The Taínos who inhabited Puerto Rico before the arrival of Christopher Columbus in 1492, played a series of games which were both ceremonial and diversional, such as races, contests involving body strength and fishing. However, the two most important of these sports were the simulated warrior fights (similar to the gladiators) and ball playing. The ball game was played in a field, which they called "Batey", situated in the middle of the village. The fields were either shaped like a triangle or like a "U". The ball was made of vegetable leaves, which gave it flexibility. Two teams played against each other. The objective of the game was to keep the ball in constant motion. The players were allowed to use their heads, elbows, shoulders and knees. The team would lose a point, if for any reason the ball stopped moving. The score was kept with a mark on the ground and the game would end after the losing team received a certain number of points. The winners were treated like heroes and the losers were sacrificed. The game had changed by the time the first Spanish settlers arrived. According to Fray Bartolomé de las Casas the game was played in the following manner: "One team served the ball and the other team returned it, using anything but the hands. If the ball arrived at shoulder height, it was returned like lightning. When it came in near the ground, the player rapidly hit the ground, striking the ball with his buttocks. Play continued from side to side until an error was made." In 1975, archaeologists from the Guaynia Society of Archeology and History at the Catholic University of Puerto Rico, members of the Archeological Society of the Southwest announced the discovery of the ruins of a "Batey" in an area called Tibes, on the outskirts of the city of Ponce. A total of 9 ball fields were discovered under thick forest overgrowth dating back to AD 25 in the area which is now known as "Centro Ceremonial Indigena de Tibes" (The Tibes Indigenoius Ceremonial Center). The site is now a tourist attraction and is open to the public. Artifacts found on the site are on display and can be seen in a museum on the site and in the Ponce Museum of Art.

=== Spanish colonization ===
The first Spaniards to inhabit the island were soldiers (Conquistadores), later they were followed by farmers, miners and their families. By the 1660s, the game of pelota was practiced at Puerto Rico, and influential enough as a sociopolitical tool to create an incident between governor Juan de Velasco and the bishop of San Juan. The most common sports were horse racing, cockfighting and dominoes. The first horse track was built in San Juan in 1887. One of the most popular sports was "Boliche". The men would gather in the town plaza and roll a small ball made of wood with the objective of knocking down pins. "Boliche" was similar to bowling. Another popular sport was bullfighting, which was limited to the larger cities of Ponce and San Juan. Jousting and horse racing became popular among the elite, who were capable to sustaining the animals. Bowling and fencing were also mostly present in this social group. Under the Spanish caste system, the lower classes practiced other games. However, cockfighting was heterogeneously practiced. During the 19th Century, a migration of Germans brought with it the practice of gymnastics. In the 1890s, baseball arrived to Puerto Rico despite being made illegal by Spain.

=== American (United States) colonization ===
In the late 19th century "new" sports were introduced in Puerto Rico, after Puerto Rico became an American territory when the United States defeated Spain in the Spanish–American War. Baseball, which was invented in the United States, was introduced to the island by a group of Puerto Ricans and Cubans who learned the sport in the United States. The sport was also played by the American soldiers who organized games as part of their training. Puerto Ricans were also introduced to the sports of boxing and basketball by the occupying military forces. The development of massified sports mostly took off after 1899, since government initiatives were absent during the Spanish regime, tough baseball was starting to organize.

Under the new metropole, the YMCA and colonial education system took advantage of the popularity of sports among the general public to further an Americanization project. Baseball, basketball, swimming, volleyball and athletics, among others, were used for these purposes. The average school was well equipped by 1902, and the University of Puerto Rico (UPR) had its first formal instructor the following year. This coincided with an island wide initiative by the government. By November, a collaboration between local and American politicians had led to the creation of the Athletic Club of San Juan. A number of urban schools integrated athletics, while rural ones lagged behind. Ponce in particular prospered, having sophisticated facilities and dominating the competition during the first two decades of the 20th Century.

A dichotomy soon emerged, with soccer being favored by those that identified with the Hispanic tradition (who, being generally Catholic, also resented the YMCA) and becoming a form of resistance. The administration took notice and created obstacles for this sport, all the while promoting "American" ones to children. Besides their Spanish origin, the involvement of money led to harsher regulations for horse racing and cockfighting. In 1912, Nicasio Olmo of Arecibo won the Bronx Marathon while wearing a shirt bearing the flag of Puerto Rico in defiance of orders issued by the United States Athletic Union. Back at Puerto Rico, he created the Porto Rican Athletic Club. By personally assuming the honorific presidency and bestowing the Real San Juan Foot-Ball Club with royal sanctioning in January 1921, Spanish monarch Alfonso XIII became involved in this dichotomy.

Physical education would take more emphasis after World War I broke out, as it helped create fit soldiers. Baseball grew exponentially, reaching 73 teams by 1915. In contrast, basketball had 58 and athletics 39. In 1927, the Athletic Commission was created to oversee boxing and wrestling.

Puerto Rico made its debut in the 1930 Central American and Caribbean Games, though the delegation only featured four Puerto Ricans. In 1931, team was sent to a tournament in Venezuela, from which it emerged undefeated. These results created enthusiasm for Olympic representation, beginning a process consonant with other examples of Joseph Arbena's concept of Latin American sport nationalism. For Puerto Rico, representation meant taking the same Sports that were emphasized in the Americanization process and repurposed them to create a proper identity. Occurring parallel to the growth of the autonomist movement, Olympic participation helped create a venue in which to express national identity despite politically remaining within a colonial relationship.

During the 1930s, Nationalists did not publicly weigh in on Olympic representation. Some athletes, however, openly expressed their sympathy and faced political repercussions for this. By the 1960s, the Movimiento Pro Independencia adopted the posture that it would defend Olympic representation. American politics had a direct impact on the Puerto Rican Olympic movement, including The Good Neighbor Policy and their participation in World War II and the Cold War. Beginning in 1937, Cosme Beitía created initiatives at the UPR that fueled the new program with athletes. By the 1940s, facilities for mass practice became increasingly available throughout Puerto Rico, as the emphasis of competition between schools continued and Julio Enrique Monagas led the Un parque para cada pueblo initiative.

== Modern era ==
=== Puerto Rico and Puerto Ricans in the Olympic Games ===
Flag of Puerto Rico

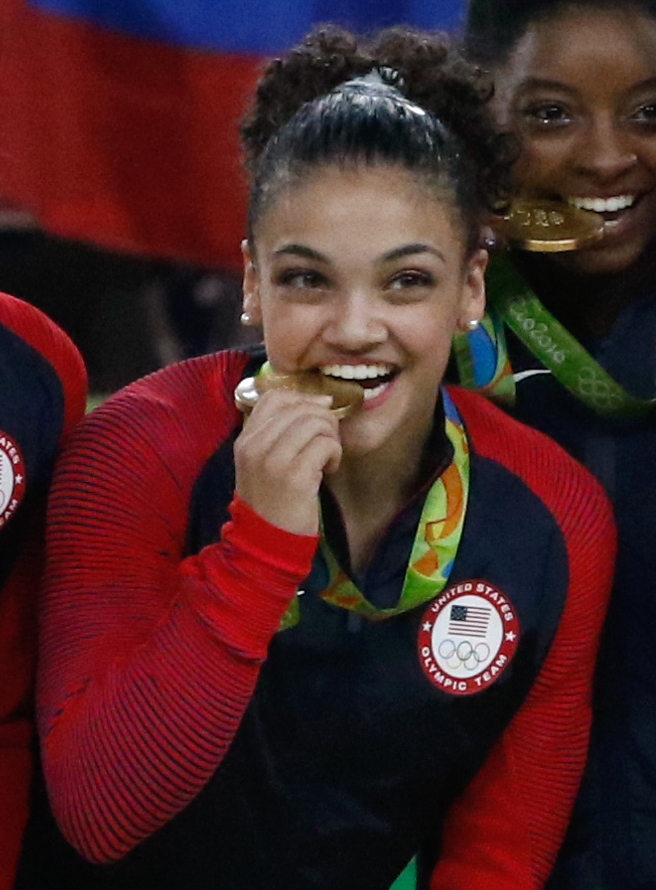
Laurie Hernandez

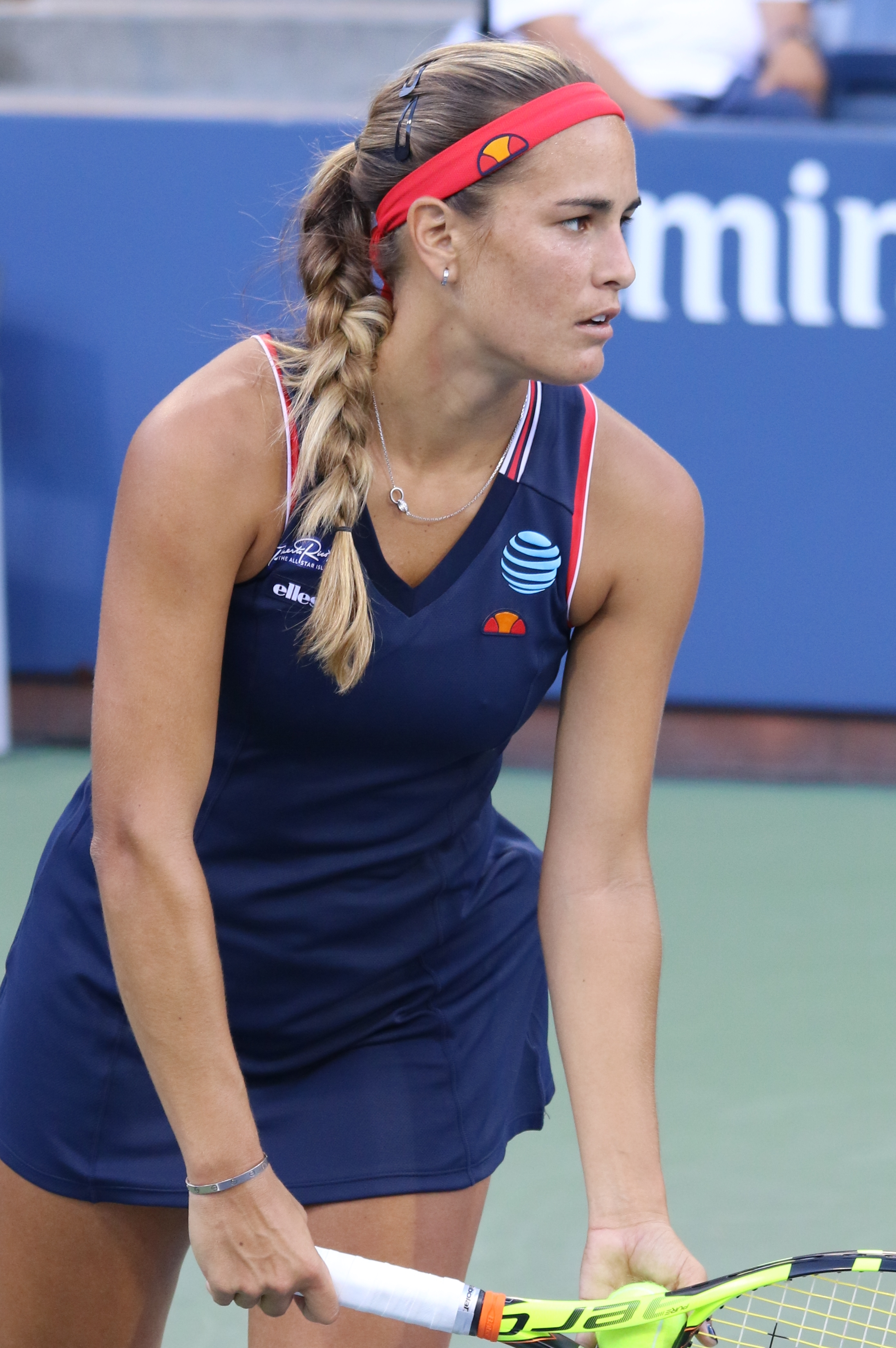
Monica Puig won the first Olympic gold medal for Puerto Rico

Puerto Rico participates in the Olympics as an independent nation but because of Puerto Ricans having American citizenship, Puerto Rican athletes have the option of representing Puerto Rico or moving to the United States, living there for 3 previous years or more and then representing that country in the games. Some Puerto Ricans, such as Gigi Fernández in tennis, have won gold medals for the U.S.

In 1944, the creation of the Unión Gubernamental Deportiva Interamericana extended the amateur rules used in Puerto Rico to Cuba and the Dominican Republic. During the final stage of Piñero's administration and the early incumbency of Luis Muñoz Marín, supporting sports was seen as a wise political move. During this time having an "unthreatening" escape valve for expressing national identity had an effect of perpetuating colonialism by furthering the PPD's Commonwealth project. Sports would serve as diplomatic venue to assert the idea that a form of "association" had been enacted, while this notion was under fire from the political opposition that asserted that the status of unincorporated territory remained unchanged. At the Recreation and Parks Commission, Monagas remained in complete control of the local sports scene, leading an effort to present sports as an outlet for the increasing number of industrial workers.

The 1948 Summer Olympics celebrated in London, was a historical one for Puerto Rico because it was the first time that the island would participate as a nation in a major international sporting event. The island's delegation consisted of only three members, two of which finished among the ten best in pole vault. In their regional participations, the Puerto Ricans had carried the United States flag into the games. The United States protested, claiming that two nations could not use the same flag at the same time. The decree of Commonwealth on 25 July 1952 would give the Puerto Rican delegation a flag of their own.

During the first three decades of Olympic representation, independence supporters were skeptical of this development since the PPD promoted it as a new window of diplomacy between the United States and the region, later also being used to make the claim that it supported the idea that the Commonwealth had solved the colonial issue. Some statehood supporters, on the other hand, were willing to abandon Olympic representation if this meant achieving their political goals. Others propose the continuation of the COPUR, a stance that conflicts with the Amateur Sports Act of 1978 and has been dismissed by former IOC members Genaro Marchand and Richard Carrión.

In 1980, the United States boycotted the Olympic Games in Moscow, Russian SFSR, USSR in protest of the Soviet invasion of Afghanistan. Germán Rieckehoff, who was then the president of the Puerto Rican Olympic Committee, was against the boycott because he believed that politics should not get involved with sporting events. He was, therefore, denied economic support from the local government. Rieckehoff did however, manage to send one athlete to represent Puerto Rico in boxing, Alberto Mercado, who became the only American citizen to participate in the 1980 Olympics.

In 1982, the Government of Puerto Rico, headed by then governor Carlos Romero Barceló, withheld economic support from the athletic delegation headed to Cuba, where the Central American and Caribbean Games were going to be held. The Puerto Rican Olympic Committee, under the leadership of Rieckehoff, had to appeal directly to the people for donations and were able to send the delegation. The Puerto Rican Olympic Committee is also the organization in charge of selecting the Puerto Rican athletes which represent the island in the Pan American Games and the Central American and Caribbean Games.

The Puerto Rican national baseball team won a bronze medal at the 1988 Summer Olympic Games in Seoul, South Korea, but that medal is not counted among Puerto Rico's Olympic medals totals because baseball was only an exhibition sport during those games.

The 1988 Winter Olympics, officially known as the "XV Olympic Winter Games", was celebrated in Calgary, Alberta, Canada between 13 and 28 February. It was the first Winter Olympics ever held in Canada. It was also the first time that a Puerto Rican team was sent to represent the island in an Olympic ski competition. No Puerto Rican had ever skied in the Olympics. The six-person Puerto Rican ski team was made up of native Puerto Ricans. They were Félix Flechas, Walter Sandza, Kevin Wilson, his sister Mary Pat Wilson and Jason Edelmann. Mary Pat Wilson is Puerto Rico's first and only female Olympic skier. Even though the team did not do well in the competition, they were highly respected by their competitors. Since then. Puerto Rico has participated in all but three of the Winter Olympic Games, missing those of 2006, 2010, and 2014.

Kristina Brandi represented Puerto Rico in the 2004 Summer Olympics in Athens, Greece. She became the first tennis player representing Puerto Rico to win a singles match in an Olympic when she beat Jelena Kostanić from Croatia (7–5 and 6–1). She lost in the second round to Russian Anastasia Myskina.

At the 2016 Summer Olympics in Rio de Janeiro, Monica Puig made Olympic history when she became the first person to win an Olympic gold medal for Puerto Rico by defeating Germany's Angelique Kerber in the women's singles tennis final. She became the first Puerto Rican female medalist in any sport. On 2 August 2021, Jasmine Camacho-Quinn won Puerto Rico's second Olympic gold medal. She won the medal in the Women's 100m Hurdles in the Olympic games which were celebrated in Tokyo, Japan.

=== Olympics medalists ===
The following table has a list of Puerto Ricans, including people of Puerto Rican ancestry, who won Olympic medals. "Puerto Rican" is a term also used to describe a resident of the United States who was "born in Puerto Rico or who traces their family ancestry to Puerto Rico." Not all represented the island, some represented the United States. Puerto Ricans have won a total of 38 Olympic medals, 28 representing the United States and 10 representing Puerto Rico.

Puerto Rican Olympic Medalists
#	Name	Medal/s	Sport	Year and place	Country represented
1	Juan Evangelista Venegas Trinidad	Bronze	Men's Bantamweight Boxing	1948 London, United Kingdom	Puerto Rico
2	José Luis "Chegüí" Torres Rivera (Note: Born in Puerto Rico.)	Silver	Men's Light-Middleweight Boxing	1956 Melbourne, Australia	United States
3	Orlando Maldonado	Bronze	Men's Light-Flyweight Boxing	1976, Montreal, Canada	Puerto Rico
4	Luis Ortiz Flores	Silver	Men's Lightweight Boxing	1984 Los Angeles, United States	Puerto Rico
5	Arístides González Ortiz	Bronze	Men's Middleweight Boxing	1984 Los Angeles, United States	Puerto Rico
6	Aníbal Santiago Acevedo	Bronze	Men's Welterweight Boxing	1992 Barcelona, Spain	Puerto Rico
7	Beatriz "Gigi" Fernández Ferrer	Gold (2)	Women's Doubles Tennis	1992 Barcelona, Spain; 1996 Atlanta, United States	United States
8	Lisa Maria Fernandez (Note: Puerto Rican heritage comes from the mother.)	Gold (3)	Women's Softball	1996 Atlanta, United States; 2000 Sydney, Australia; 2004 Athens, Greece	United States
9	Daniel Santos Peña	Bronze	Men's Welterweight Boxing	1996 Atlanta, United States	Puerto Rico
10	Jonathan William "Jonny" Moseley	Gold	Men's Mogul Freestyle Skiing	1998 Nagano, Japan	United States
11	Julie Wu Chu (Note: Puerto Rican heritage comes from maternal grandparent.)	Silver (3), Bronze	Women's Ice Hockey	2002 Salt Lake City, United States; 2006 Turin, Italy; 2010 Vancouver, Canada; 2014 Sochi, Russia	United States
12	Carmelo Kyam Anthony (Note: Puerto Rican heritage comes from the father.)	Gold (3), Bronze	Men's Basketball	2004 Athens, Greece; 2008 Beijing, China; 2012 London, United Kingdom; 2016 Rio de Janeiro, Brazil	United States
13	Maritza (Correia) McClendon	Silver	4×100m Freestyle Swimming	2004 Athens, Greece	United States
14	Benjamin Alexandro "Ben" Agosto	Silver	Mixed Ice Dancing Figure Skating	2006 Turin, Italy	United States
15	Jacob Joseph "Jake" Arrieta (Note: Puerto Rican heritage comes from the grandfather.)	Bronze	Men's Baseball	2008 Beijing, China	United States
16	Kyla Briana Ross	Gold	Women's Gymnastics	2012 London, United Kingdom	United States
17	Javier Culson Pérez	Bronze	Men's 400m Hurdles Athletics	2012 London, United Kingdom	Puerto Rico
18	Jaime Yusept Espinal Fajardo	Silver	Men's 84kg Freestyle Wrestling	2012 London, United Kingdom	Puerto Rico
19	Jessica Marie Steffens	Silver, Gold	Women's Water Polo	2008 Beijing, China; 2012 London, United Kingdom	United States
20	Margaret Ann "Maggie" Steffens	Gold (3)	Women's Water Polo	2012 London, United Kingdom; 2016 Rio de Janeiro, Brazil; 2020 Tokyo, Japan	United States
21	Lauren Zoe "Laurie" Hernandez (Note: Puerto Rican heritage comes from grandparents.)	Gold, Silver	Women's Gymnastics (G), Women's Balance Beam (S)	2016 Rio de Janeiro, Brazil	United States
22	Monica Puig Marchán	Gold	Women's Singles Tennis	2016 Rio de Janeiro, Brazil	Puerto Rico
23	Jasmine Camacho-Quinn	Gold, Bronze	Women's 100m Hurdles Athletics	2020 Tokyo, Japan; 2024 Paris, France	Puerto Rico
24	Jack Henry López Sánchez	Silver	Men's Baseball	2020 Tokyo, Japan	United States
26	Sebastian Rivera	Bronze	Men's 65 kg Freestyle Wrestling	2024 Paris, France	Puerto Rico

Notes: Devin Booker was added as a Puerto Rican, but in fact he is of Mexican heritage https://www.nba.com/suns/features/suns-celebrate-rich-history-and-composition-our-community-aps-los-suns-night-tuesday and https://www.espn.com/espn/wire/_/section/nba/id/18455058 and from a Booker interview https://www.chieftain.com/embed/video/7836433002/

Total Olympic Medals
Total of Medals for Puerto Rico	Gold	Silver	Bronze
12	2	2	8
Total of Medals for the United States	Gold	Silver	Bronze
28	16	9	3
Total of Medals	Gold	Silver	Bronze
40	18	11	11

Puerto Rican Medalists in Demonstration Olympic Sports
#	Name	Medal/s	Sport	Year and place	Country represented
1	Albert Bracero	Bronze	Men's Baseball	1988 Seoul, South Korea	Puerto Rico
2	Elliot Cianchini	Bronze	Men's Baseball	1988 Seoul, South Korea	Puerto Rico
3	Luis O. Dávila	Bronze	Men's Baseball	1988 Seoul, South Korea	Puerto Rico
4	Jesús I. Feliciano	Bronze	Men's Baseball	1988 Seoul, South Korea	Puerto Rico
5	James C. Figueroa	Bronze	Men's Baseball	1988 Seoul, South Korea	Puerto Rico
6	Anthony García	Bronze	Men's Baseball	1988 Seoul, South Korea	Puerto Rico
7	Efraín García	Bronze	Men's Baseball	1988 Seoul, South Korea	Puerto Rico
8	Eddie Horrio	Bronze	Men's Baseball	1988 Seoul, South Korea	Puerto Rico
9	José Lorenzana	Bronze	Men's Baseball	1988 Seoul, South Korea	Puerto Rico
10	Víctor L. Martínez	Bronze	Men's Baseball	1988 Seoul, South Korea	Puerto Rico
11	Roberto Mateo	Bronze	Men's Baseball	1988 Seoul, South Korea	Puerto Rico
12	José V. Meléndez	Bronze	Men's Baseball	1988 Seoul, South Korea	Puerto Rico
13	Ángel A. Morales	Bronze	Men's Baseball	1988 Seoul, South Korea	Puerto Rico
14	Benedicto Poupart	Bronze	Men's Baseball	1988 Seoul, South Korea	Puerto Rico
15	Mariano Quinones	Bronze	Men's Baseball	1988 Seoul, South Korea	Puerto Rico
16	Luis Ramos	Bronze	Men's Baseball	1988 Seoul, South Korea	Puerto Rico
17	Jorge Robles	Bronze	Men's Baseball	1988 Seoul, South Korea	Puerto Rico
18	Abimael Rosario	Bronze	Men's Baseball	1988 Seoul, South Korea	Puerto Rico
19	Roberto Santana	Bronze	Men's Baseball	1988 Seoul, South Korea	Puerto Rico
20	Wilfredo Vélez	Bronze	Men's Baseball	1988 Seoul, South Korea	Puerto Rico
21	Herbert J. "Herb" Pérez (Note: Puerto Rican heritage comes from the father.)	Gold	Men's Middleweight Taekwondo	1992 Barcelona, Spain	United States

Notes:

Total Olympic Medals in Demonstration Olympic Sports
Total of Medals for Puerto Rico	Gold	Silver	Bronze
1	0	0	1
Total of Medals for the United States	Gold	Silver	Bronze
1	1	0	0
Total of Medals	Gold	Silver	Bronze
2	1	0	1

=== Puerto Rico at the Paralympic Games ===
Puerto Rico debuted in the Paralympic Games on 1988. In this event, Isabel Bustamante was awarded the first medals for the delegation, winning one gold and two silver medals in athletics. In the 2000 Summer Paralympics, Alexis Pizarro became the first male athlete to win a medal for Puerto Rico, reaching bronze in athletics. Pizarro repeated this performance in the 2004 Summer Paralympics.

On 20 August 2008, David Bernier awarded the flag of Puerto Rico to Nilda Gómez, who was selected to be the flag bearer in the opening ceremonies of the 2008 Paralympics. Three athletes that registered A-marks attended the ceremony, which also included Alexis Pizarro in athletics and Julio Reguero in sailing. Puerto Rico's first medal in this edition of the Paralympics was won by Gómez, who won bronze in rifle shooting. She won bronze in the 10-meter trial, finishing with 489 points.

=== Puerto Rico at the Special Olympics ===
Puerto Rico's Special Olympics program was founded in 1970, since then it has offered services to more than a thousand athletes.

In the 2003 Special Olympics World Summer Games, Puerto Rico won 57 medals.

Puerto Rico won a total of 34 medals in the 2007 Special Olympics World Summer Games, including 7 gold, 18 silver and 9 bronze medals. Due to the team's performance, the Senate of Puerto Rico organized a ceremony where the athletes and trainers received recognitions.

== Distribution and practice among sports ==
=== American football ===
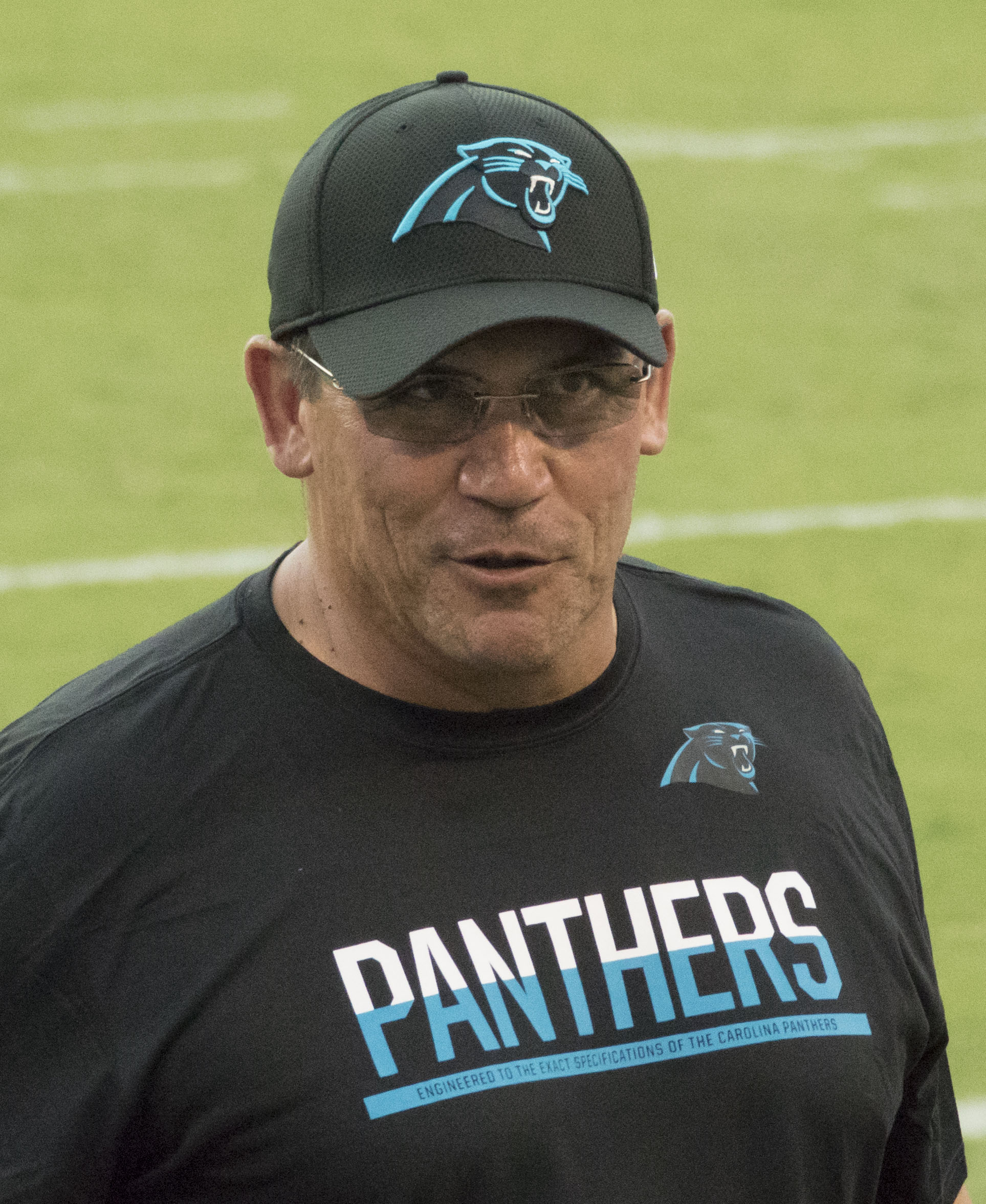
Carolina Panthers Head Coach Ron Rivera

Ron Rivera became the first NFL player of Puerto Rican descent when he played for the Chicago Bears in the 1980s. In 1986, Rivera also became the first NFL player of Puerto Rican descent to win a Super Bowl championship ring.

Others who have played in the NFL are O.J. Santiago of the Atlanta Falcons, Marco Rivera who played for the Dallas Cowboys and who in 2002 became the first Puerto Rican to play in the Pro Bowl as a member of the Green Bay Packers (the first of three appearances) and Glenn Martinez who in 2005 played for the Detroit Lions, Ken Amato who played for the Tennessee Titans and Alvin Pearman who played with the Jacksonville Jaguars are of Puerto Rican descent. Willie Colon who was drafted by the Pittsburgh Steelers in 2006 and won Super Bowl XLIII is also of Puerto Rican descent. Aaron Hernandez, formerly of the New England Patriots, was also of Puerto Rican descent. Victor Cruz, another player of Puerto Rican descent, played for the New York Giants and was known for his salsa touchdown dance. While all of these players are of Puerto Rican descent, there has yet to be a Puerto Rican born NFL player.

American Football has been played in the island for many decades, dating back to the installment of American military bases. Puerto Rico currently has 4 football leagues. PR Pee Wee league, for children 8–16, PRHSFL, for high school students, the newly created AFAF, for college students, and PRAFL, a semi-professional league. Although football has been in the island for so many years, it is not widely known. Many things attribute to this, for example lack of proper funding and advertising, lack of high school affiliated teams, both attributing to lack of good coaching. In July 2012, the Puerto Rico American Football Federation became a member of the International Federation of American Football.

Pee Wee Football League This federation has 4 divisions, with areas in: Baldrich, Parque Central, University Gardens, Parkville, Ft. Buchanan, Carolina, and lastly Caguas. The league is played from January to March at "El Complejo Deportivo Roberto Clemente" in San Juan Saturday mornings. The following is a table with the years and weight distribution for each division:

C Division	B Division	A Division	AA Division
8 Years - No limit	10 Years - No limit	12 Years - No limit	14 Years - No limit
9 Years - No limit	11 Years - No limit	13 Years - No limit	15 Years - 200 lbs
10 Years - 105 lbs	12 Years - 130 lbs	14 Years - 150 lbs	16 Years - 200 lbs
11 Years - 80 lbs	12 Years - 105 lbs	13 Years - 130 lbs	

PRHSFL This league has 6 Varsity teams and 3 teams at Junior Varsity level. the league is made up of 2 schools, Antilles High School Pirates, and Commonwealth Comets, and four clubs, Carolina Blittz, Bayamón Wolfpack, University Garden Dolphins, and Parque Central Blue Wave.

AFAF This league was founded in 2009 to rival the PRAFL and to one day be a part of local college athletics. There are four teams, Cataño Gators, San Juan Hurricanes, Carolina Blittz, and Baldrige Falcons.

PRAFL (Puerto Rico American Football League) A semi-professional league founded in 1985, with 5 teams. The Bayamón Wolfpack, Baldrich 57 Falcons, Carolina Blitzz, Cataño Lancheros, and Fajardo Cariduros.

The Cataño Lancheros were the 2011 PRAFL Champions.

=== Baseball ===
==== Early history of baseball in Puerto Rico ====
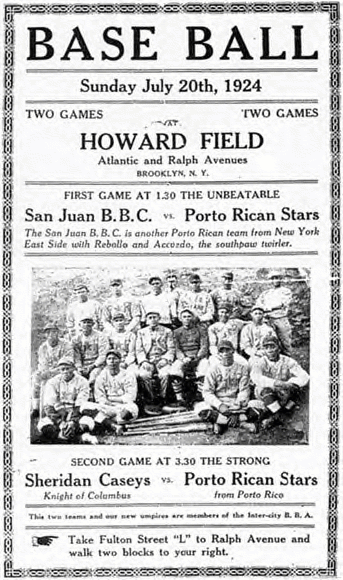
1924 poster announcing a game between a team from Puerto Rico (Porto Rico) and a team from New York made up of Puerto Ricans

During the late 19th century Puerto Rico was to witness the introduction of organized team sports. The game of baseball was first introduced to the island by a group of Puerto Ricans and Cubans who had learned the game in the United States. At first the sport was not well received by the local press and general public, it was looked upon as a silly game. The first two baseball clubs were founded in 1897. They were the Almendares Baseball Club, owned by Francisco Alamo Armas and the Borinquen Baseball Club owned by Santos Filippi.

According to the daily newspaper El País, on 11 January 1898, the first organized baseball game was played in Puerto Rico at the old velodrome which was located at the Pda.15 in Santurce, San Juan. The Borinquen team beat the Almendares with a score of 3 to 0. The first game to go a complete nine innings was played on 30 January 1898 and the Borinquen once again beat the Almendares with a score of 9 to 3.

Puerto Rico became an American territory when the United States defeated Spain in the Spanish–American War. The American soldiers stationed in Puerto Rico were permitted to organize a baseball club to play against the local clubs as diversional outlet. On 4 November 1900 the Almendares Baseball Club composed of Puerto Ricans and Cubans beat the American Baseball Club of the Second Regiment of Infantry with a score of 32 to 18. In the early 1920s, teams from Puerto Rico, such as the San Juan Stars, would travel to New York City and play against some of teams there which included teams made up of Puerto Ricans who lived there.

Modern era

Puerto Rico has over 100 Major League Baseball players who are currently active, in addition to the hundreds others who have participated in the past. These facts combine to make baseball one of the most popular sports in the island.

Some of the most notable baseball players from Puerto Rico are five Hall of Famers Roberto Clemente, Orlando Cepeda, Roberto Alomar, Iván "Pudge" Rodríguez and Edgar Martinez. Another baseball player who is a Hall of Famer and who was born to a Puerto Rican father is Reginald Martinez "Reggie" Jackson. Also amongst the notable players or former players are Jose "Cheo" Cruz, Juan González, Victor Pellot, Jorge Posada and Bernie Williams.

Chronological order of major events

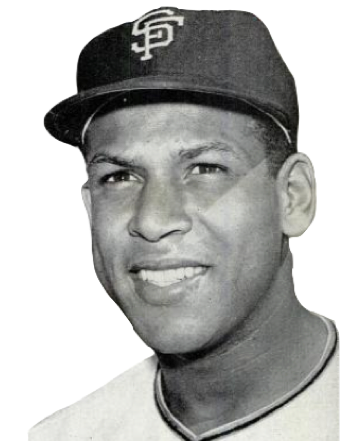
Hall of Famer Orlando Cepeda

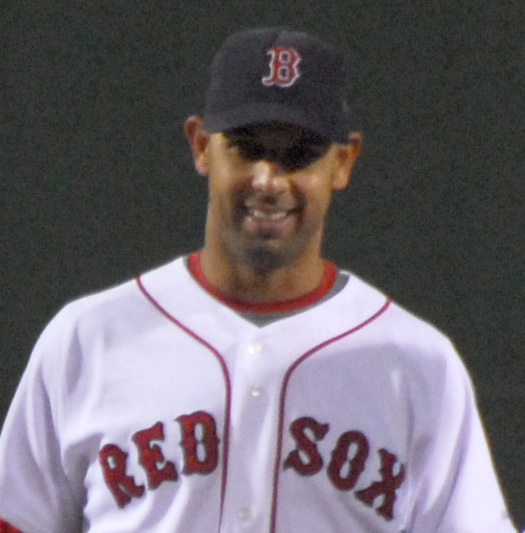
In 2018 Alex Cora, became the first Puerto Rican to manage a World Series winning team

- On 11 January 1898, the first organized baseball game is played in Puerto Rico between the Borinquen team and the Almendares team. The Borinquen won 3 to 0.
- In 1928, Emilio "Millito" Navarro of the Cuban Stars became the first Puerto Rican to play in the Negro leagues
- In 1942, Hiram Bithorn of the Chicago Cubs became the first Puerto Rican to play in the major leagues.
- In 1949, Luis Olmo (El "Jíbaro" Olmos) of the Brooklyn Dodgers became the first Puerto Rican to play in a World Series game and the first one to hit a home run and to get three hits, in the same game.
- In 1951, Puerto Rico won its first and only Baseball World Cup.
- In 1954, Rubén Gómez of the New York Giants became the first Puerto Rican to pitch in a World Series game and the first one to receive a World Series ring.
- In 1972, Roberto Clemente of the Pittsburgh Pirates became the first Hispanic to reach 3,000 hits in what would prove to be his career's final at-bat.
- In 1973, following his death in a plane crash, Clemente became the first Puerto Rican born player to be enshrined in the Baseball Hall of Fame.
- In 1984, Willie Hernández of the Detroit Tigers became the first Puerto Rican to win both the AL Cy Young Award and the AL MVP Award.
- In 1992, José "Cheo" Cruz was honored by the Houston Astros when his #25 was retired by the team.
- In 1993, Reginald Martinez "Reggie" Jackson, whose father is Puerto Rican, was enshrined in the National Baseball Hall of Fame.
- In 1995, Leon Day, a Pitcher in the Negro leagues who played for "Los Tiburones de Aguadilla" the "Aguadilla Sharks" was inducted into the Hall of Fame. His love for the island is reflected in the fact that he is the only Hall of Famer to be enshrined with a cap of a team outside the mainland United States; his plaque depicts him as a "Aguadilla Shark".
- In 1999, Orlando "Peruchin" Cepeda became the second Puerto Rican born player to be enshrined in the Baseball Hall of Fame.
- In 2001, Major League Baseball history was made when Opening Day was in San Juan at the Hiram Bithorn Stadium with a game between the Texas Rangers and the Toronto Blue Jays.
- In 2003 as well as 2004, the former Montreal Expos played 22 home games each year at Hiram Bithorn Stadium in San Juan, before moving to Washington, D.C. and becoming the Washington Nationals.
- In 2011, Roberto Alomar became the third Puerto Rican born player to be enshrined in the Baseball Hall of Fame.
- In 2017, Iván "Pudge" Rodríguez became the fourth Puerto Rican born player to be enshrined in the Baseball Hall of Fame.
- In 2018, Alex Cora became the first Puerto Rican to manage a World Series winning team when the Boston Red Sox defeated the LA Dodgers.
- In 2019, Edgar Martinez became the fifth Puerto Rican born player to be enshrined in the Baseball Hall of Fame.
- In 2026, Carlos Beltran will become the sixth Puerto Rican to be enshrined in the National Baseball Hall of Fame.

==== Currently ====
Puerto Rico national baseball team logo

Puerto Rico has a winter baseball league named the Puerto Rico Baseball League that has operated since the early 20th century. The champion of the Puerto Rico league represents Puerto Rico is in the annual Caribbean World Series. It currently has five teams:

- Criollos de Caguas (Caguas Creoles)
- Gigantes de Carolina (Carolina Giants)
- Indios de Mayagüez (Mayagüez Indians)
- Leones de Ponce (Ponce Lions)
- Cangrejeros de Santurce (Santurce Crabbers)

The Puerto Rico national baseball team competes in international events, including the World Baseball Classic, separately from the United States. Hiram Bithorn Stadium in San Juan has hosted first-round games in each of the first three World Baseball Classic tournaments.

=== Basketball ===
==== Early history of basketball in Puerto Rico ====
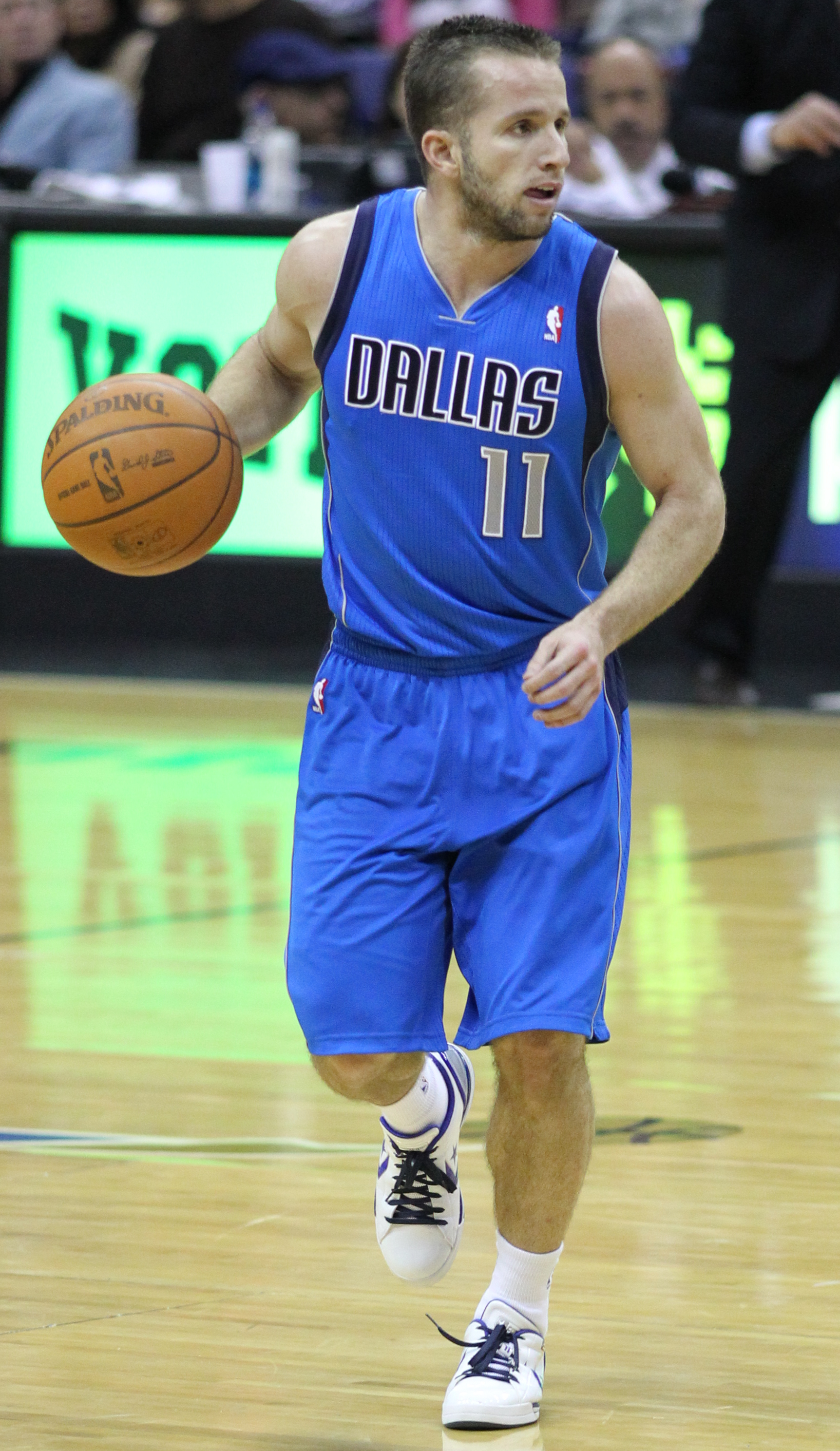
José Juan "J.J." Barea

Basketball was used by the American soldiers in Puerto Rico as part of their physical training. When the soldiers played basketball, they used a plain straw basket which was cut open at both ends and placed it on the highest end of a pole. For a ball, they used a football and the game was played without any established set of rules.

In 1913, the YMCA of Puerto Rico organized the first game played using the official rules of basketball and in 1916, the YMCA organized the first basketball tournament in Puerto Rico. Teams organized in the other YMCAs in the island participated in the tournament. The first basketball organization in Puerto Rico was the San Juan Basketball League. Río Piedras and Bayamón later followed and formed their own leagues.

Basketball became a popular sport in Puerto Rico, due in part to the BSN, which has been around since the 1930s. During the early 1980s, with many games shown on television, the sport's popularity increased. There is also a women's professional league, which is affiliated to the BSN. Street basketball is also popular among Puerto Rico's youth.

Chronological order of major events

- In 1913, the first game of basketball was played in Puerto Rico.
- In 1916, the first basketball tournament in Puerto Rico was organized.
- Alfred "Butch" Lee, a member of the 1976 Olympic basketball team, became the first Puerto Rican in the NBA when in 1978 he was drafted by the Atlanta Hawks. Lee was also the first Puerto Rican to play on the NBA play-offs as a member of the 1979–80 Los Angeles Lakers. He was awarded an NBA Championship ring, even though he did not participate in that season's NBA Finals because of his injuries.
- José Ortiz "Piculin" was signed by the Utah Jazz in 1988.
- In 1988, Ramón Rivas followed Ortiz two weeks later, being signed by the Boston Celtics.
- Dick Versace became the first person of Puerto Rican descent to coach an NBA team in 1988. He was the head coach of the Indiana Pacers from 1988 to 1990.
- In 1989, Ramón Ramos was signed by the Portland Trail Blazers, but he never played because of a life-changing accident.
- In 2000, Daniel Santiago was signed to play for the Phoenix Suns.
- In 2001, Carlos Arroyo was signed by the Toronto Raptors.
- In 2004, Puerto Rico's national basketball team became the first team to defeat the United States team in the Olympic competitions of Athens.
- In 2011, José Juan Barea became the first Puerto Rican to play in the NBA Finals for a championship-winning team, the Dallas Mavericks.
- In 2015, Carla Cortijo became the first Puerto Rican born female to play in the Women's National Basketball Association (WNBA). Her position in the Atlanta Dream was that of guard.
- In 2016, Carmelo Anthony, whose father is Puerto Rican, won his third Olympic gold medal in Rio de Janeiro, Brazil as member of the U.S. Olympic Basketball Team.
- The Portland Trail Blazers Maurice Harkless played for the Puerto Rican National Team in 2016 and Shabazz Napier also with Portland has been in multiple talks since 2012 about joining Puerto Rico's national team.

==== International Puerto Rican Basketball players ====
Puerto Rico's national basketball team has reached the Olympic Games multiple times, including the 2004 Athens Olympics, where they became the first team to defeat the United States Dream Team during Olympic competition. Puerto Rico's national team has won gold medals in other international competitions.

Puerto Ricans have also been members of the Harlem Globetrotters. In 1995, Orlando Antigua, whose mother is Puerto Rican, became the first non-black in 52 years to play for the Harlem Globetrotters. In 2008, Orlando Melendez a.k.a. "El Gato" became the first Puerto Rican-born player and the second Hispanic to play for the Harlem Globetrotters.

=== Bobsled ===
Puerto Rico had a Bobsled team in the 1992, 1994 and 1998 Winter Olympics.

=== Boxing ===
==== Early history of boxing in Puerto Rico ====
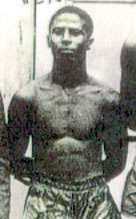
Juan Evangelista Venegas

The sport of boxing was also introduced by the United States military which occupied Puerto Rico and, just as basketball was, boxing was used by the American soldiers as part of their physical training. Boxing competitions amongst the soldiers were open to the public. The first boxing match in Puerto Rico was held on 15 January 1899.

Boxing has, for many years, disputed the top spot for the Puerto Rican fan's favorite sport with Baseball and Basketball. Puerto Ricans have distinguished themselves both as amateurs and professionals. In 1917, Nero Chen became the first Puerto Rican professional boxer to gain international recognition. Puerto Rico has also been the site of many championship fights.

==== Boxing in the Olympics ====
In 1948, boxer Juan Evangelista Venegas earned Puerto Rico's first Olympic medal, finishing his participation in London with a bronze medal that year. Subsequently, Puerto Rico has earned five more medals in Olympic boxing, including a silver one by Luis Ortiz in 1984. That silver medal is the only silver medal ever won by any Puerto Rican native at Olympic Games. Although he did not win a medal, Alberto Mercado became, in 1980, the only American citizen to actually participate in the Moscow Olympics.

==== Professional boxing ====
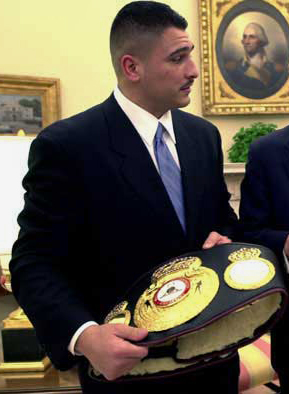
John Ruiz

There are fourteen Puerto Ricans in the International Boxing Hall of Fame, they are Puerto Rico's first world champion Sixto Escobar, Wilfred Benítez, Wilfredo Gómez, Carlos Ortíz, Edwin Rosario, Pedro Montañez, José Chegui Torres, Joe Cortez (referee), Herbert "Cocoa Kid" Hardwick, Felix "Tito" Trinidad, Hector "Macho" Camacho, Mario Rivera Martino (writer), Miguel Cotto and Ivan Calderon. Benítez (The youngest champion in boxing's history) as of 23 May 1981, was the youngest three-time world champion after knocking out World Junior Middleweight champion Maurice Hope. Hardwick, was a member of the feared "Black Murderers' Row". The late Mario Rivera Martino, served Puerto Rican boxing for more than 50 years as a writer and eventual commissioner.

Other boxers from Puerto Rico which have excelled in the sport include: Carlos De Leon, Ossie Ocasio, Alfredo Escalera, Belinda Laracuente, John Ruiz who made history by becoming boxing's first Latin American world Heavyweight champion ever, after beating WBA world champ Evander Holyfield, Alex Sánchez, Samuel Serrano, Amanda Serrano (no relation), Ada Vélez, who is the first Puerto Rican-native Women's boxing world champion and Jose Miguel Cotto.

In 2006, Puerto Rican Miguel Santana made boxing history by becoming the fighter who waited the longest after a title bout to have a losing world title bout recognized as a mistake by a major organization. The IBF recognized Santana's challenge of IBF Lightweight champion Greg Haugen (who originally beat Santana by an eleventh-round technical decision) as erroneous because of a fight-fixing and betting scandal that took place during the era the contest happened, and gave Santana a special recognition.

Chronological order of major events

External audio
- You may watch Wilfred Benítez vs. Antonio Cervantes, here
- and a documentary titled Puerto Rico's Finest Fighters here

- On 15 January 1899, the first boxing match was held in Puerto Rico.
- In 1917, Nero Chen became the first Puerto Rican professional boxer to gain international recognition.
- In May 1927, boxing was legalized in Puerto Rico by an order signed by US appointed governor Horace Mann Towner.
- On 26 June 1934, Sixto Escobar became the first Puerto Rican to win an undisputed world championship
- On 11 June 1937, Herbert "Cocoa Kid" Hardwick, a Welterweight, became the first Hispanic to win a title in the World Colored Championships.
- In 1948, boxer Juan Evangelista Venegas earned Puerto Rico's first Bronze Olympic medal.
- In 1956, José Torres won a Silver Olympic Medal for the United States at the junior middleweight division at the Olympics held in Melbourne.
- In 1972, Esteban De Jesús won a ten-round decision, in Madison Square Garden, over undefeated Lightweight champion Roberto Durán in a televised bout.
- On 1 September 1973, José Roman made sports history by becoming the first Puerto Rican to fight for the World Heavyweight title when he fought and lost to World Heavyweight champion George Foreman in Tokyo, Japan.
- On 20 February 1976, the first Heavyweight title fight in Puerto Rico was celebrated in San Juan between Muhammad Ali and Jean Coopman, Ali being the victor.
- On 6 March 1976, Wilfred Benítez became the youngest world champion in history at 17 years old.
- On 21 May 1977, Wilfredo Gómez won the WBC Super Bantamweight Championship. He eventually had a streak of 32 knockouts in a row.
- In 1980, Alberto Mercado represented Puerto Rico in the Moscow Olympics. He was the only "American" citizen to actually participate in those Olympics.
- On 25 November 1980, Carlos De León became the first Latin to be world's Cruiserweight champion.
- On 30 January 1982, Wilfred Benítez outpointed legendary fighter Roberto Durán over 15 rounds.
- On 3 December 1982, the only time Wilfred Benítez and Wilfredo Gómez fight on the same program, Gomez defeats Lupe Pintor by a knockout in 14 rounds, while Benitez lasts 15 rounds with Thomas Hearns, but loses by decision.
- On 20 May 1983, Edwin Rosario outpoints Jose Luis Ramirez over 12 rounds by unanimous decision (three judges scoring the bout 115–113) to win the vacant World Boxing Council's Lightweight title, his first of three reigns as world Lightweight champion and four world championship reigns overall.
- In 1984, Luis Ortiz earned Puerto Rico's first Silver Olympic medal.
- In 1991, Carlos Ortiz became the first Puerto Rican inducted into the International Boxing Hall of Fame.
- In 1994, Wilfred Benítez was inducted into the International Boxing Hall of Fame.
- In 1995, Wilfredo Gómez was inducted into the International Boxing Hall of Fame.
- In 1997, José Torres was inducted into the International Boxing Hall of Fame.
- On 19 January 2001, Ada Vélez became the first Puerto Rican to win a women's world boxing championship.
- On 3 March 2001, John Ruiz became the first Hispanic to be crowned Heavyweight champion of the world after beating Evander Holyfield.
- In 2002, Sixto Escobar was inducted into the International Boxing Hall of Fame.
- In 2006, Edwin Rosario was inducted into the International Boxing Hall of Fame.
- In 2007, Pedro Montañez was inducted into the International Boxing Hall of Fame.
- In 2011, Joe Cortez became the first Puerto Rican boxing referee to be inducted into the International Boxing Hall of Fame
- On 10 June 2012, Herbert Lewis Hardwick a.k.a. "Cocoa Kid" was inducted into the International Boxing Hall of Fame.
- On 4 June 2014, Félix "Tito" Trinidad was inducted into the International Boxing Hall of Fame.
- In 2016, Hector Camacho, a.k.a. Hector "Macho" Camacho, was inducted into the International Boxing Hall of Fame.
- In 2018, the late Mario Rivera Martino, became the first Puerto Rican boxing sports writer and commissioner to be inducted into the International Boxing Hall of Fame.

Among the international boxers who fought in Puerto Rico in a title bout are Muhammad Ali, Roberto Durán, and Alexis Argüello. The 1970s became known in Puerto Rico as the golden era of Borinquen's (Puerto Rico's) Boxing.

Puerto Ricans in the International Boxing Hall of Fame

Number	Name	Year inducted	Notes
1	Carlos Ortíz	1991	World Jr. Welterweight Champion 1959 June 12- 1960, September 1, WBA Lightweight Champion 1962 Apr 21 – 1965 Apr 10, WBC Lightweight Champion 1963 Apr 7 – 1965 Apr 10, WBC Lightweight Champion 1965 Nov 13 – 1968 Jun 29.
2	Wilfred Benítez	1994	The youngest world champion in boxing history. WBA Light Welterweight Champion 1976 Mar 6 – 1977, WBC Welterweight Champion 1979 Jan 14 – 1979 Nov 30, WBC Light Middleweight Champion.
3	Wilfredo Gómez	1995	WBC Super Bantamweight Champion 1977 May 21 – 1983, WBC Featherweight Champion 1984 Mar 31 – 1984 Dec 8, WBA Super Featherweight Champion 1985 May 19 – 1986 May 24.
4	José "Chegui" Torres	1997	Won a silver medal in the junior middleweight at the 1956 Olympic Games. Undisputed Light Heavyweight Champion 1965 Mar 30 – 1966 Dec 16
5	Sixto Escobar	2002	Puerto Rico's first boxing champion. World Bantamweight Champion 15 Nov 1935– 23 Sep 1937, World Bantamweight Champion 20 Feb 1938– Oct 1939
6	Edwin Rosario	2006	Ranks #36 on the list of "100 Greatest Punchers of All Time." according to Ring Magazine. WBC Lightweight Champion 1983 May 1 – 1984 Nov 3, WBA Lightweight Champion 1986 Sep 26 – 1987 Nov 21, WBA Lightweight Champion 199 Jul 9 – 1990 Apr 4, WBA Light Welterweight Champion 1991 Jun 14 – 1992 Apr 10.
7	Pedro Montañez	2007	92 wins out of 103 fights. Never held a title.
8	Joe Cortez	2011	The first Puerto Rican boxing referee to be inducted into the Boxing Hall of Fame
9	Herbert "Cocoa Kid" Hardwick	2012	Member of boxing's "Black Murderers' Row". World Colored Welterweight Championship - June 11, 1937 to August 22, 1938; World Colored Middleweight Championship - January 11, 1940 until the title went extinct in the 1940s; World Colored Middleweight Championship - January 15, 1943 until the title went extinct in the 1940s
10	Félix "Tito" Trinidad	2014	Captured the IBF welterweight crown in his 20th pro bout. Won the WBA light middleweight title from David Reid in March 2000 and later that year unified titles with a 12th-round knockout against IBF champ Fernando Vargas. In 2001 became a three-division champion.
11	Héctor "Macho" Camacho	2016	First boxer to be recognized as a septuple champion in history (counting championships from minor sanctioning bodies). WBC Super Featherweight Championship - August 7, 1983 – 1984, WBC Lightweight Championship - August 10, 1985 – 1987, WBO Light Welterweight Champion - March 6, 1989 – February 23, 1991, WBO Light Welterweight Champion - May 18, 1991–1992.
12	Mario Rivera Martino	2019	First Puerto Rican boxing sports writer to be inducted into the International Boxing Hall of Fame. He served Puerto Rican boxing for more than 50 years as a writer and eventual commissioner.
13	Miguel Cotto	2022	He is a multiple-time world champion, and the first Puerto Rican boxer to win world titles in four weight classes, from light welterweight to middleweight. In 2007 and 2009,

= Indicates the person is no longer alive

=== Cockfights ===
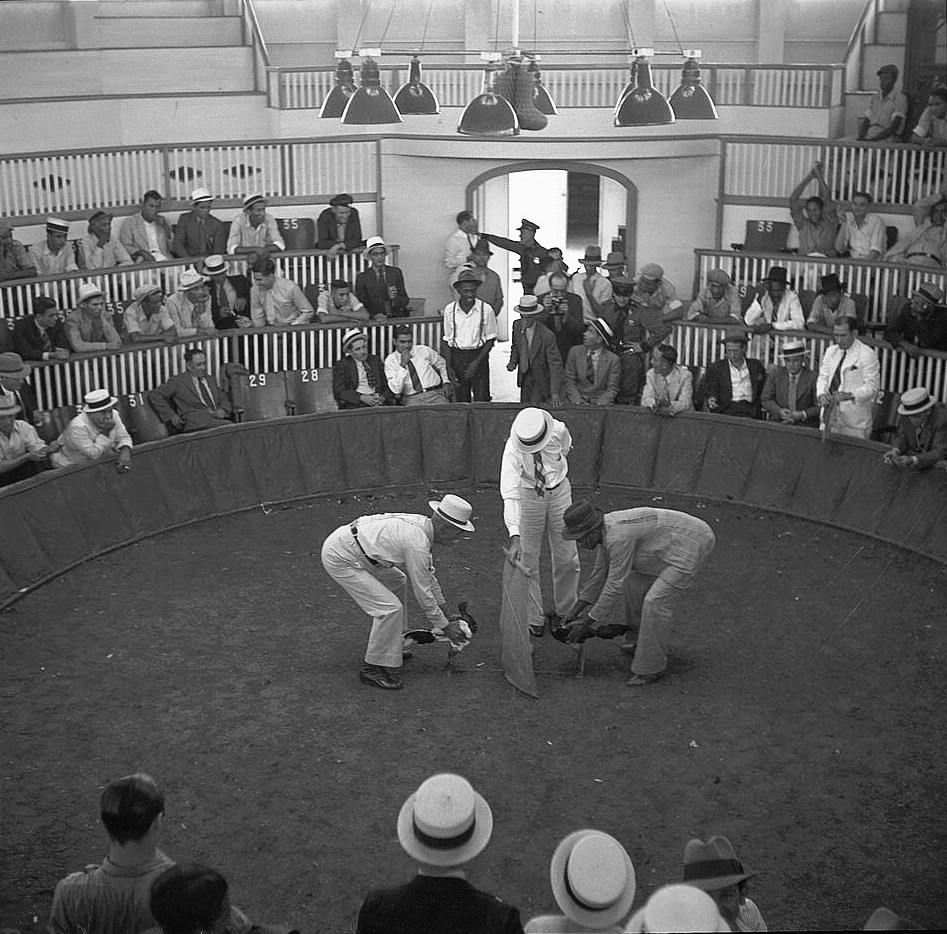
Puerto Rican cockfighting ring, circa 1937

Unlike in most states of the United States, cockfighting was legal in Puerto Rico until 2018, and there are many places that draw large crowds to see bantams fighting every weekend. It is known as the Gentleman's Sport due to the common practice of wagers being a verbal contract between two individuals and may range from $1 to thousands of dollars. Across the world, Puerto Rico has been seen as the largest capital for the controversial sport, as it is incredibly popular and often televised as other sports are. Roosters are specially bred to fight, first entering the ring between one and two years of age.

In 2018, the United States announced that it would ban cockfights in all its territories, including Puerto Rico. The ban began in January 2019.

=== Equestrian ===
The sport of equestrianism has certain popularity in Puerto Rico, more so among members of higher classes. Puerto Rico frequently sends contestants to different international tournaments, such as the Olympics. On 16 August 2003, Mark Watringl from the town of Aguadilla, represented the United States in the Pan American Games celebrated in the Dominican Republic. There he won the "Gold Medal" with a final total of 13.66 penalties compared to the 21.87 posted by Mexico. When presented with the gold medal, Watring unfurled and waved the Puerto Rican Flag. This win secured a berth in the 2004 Olympic Games in Athens, Greece. Watring represented Puerto Rico in the 2004 Olympics.

=== Fencing ===
Fencing in Puerto Rico has become popular ever since David "Quique" Bernier, Victor Bernier and the brothers Jonathan and Marcos Peña have won medals in the 2003 Pan American Games celebrated in the Dominican Republic. Mirthescka Escanellas was also a popular Puerto Rican fencer. She participated at the 1996 Summer Olympics in Atlanta, Georgia, among many other international events.

=== Golf ===
While golf is not very popular in Puerto Rico, there are many golf courses across the island such as the one at Club Deportivo del Oeste. The most famous Puerto Rican golfer is Juan "Chi-Chi" Rodríguez who was inducted into the World Golf Hall of Fame in 1992. Rodríguez used to put his hat over the hole whenever he made a birdie or eagle. After he heard that other golfers were complaining about his little act, he decided to try something new. Rodríguez developed his signature "toreador dance", where he would make believe that the birdie was a "bull" and that his putter was a "sword" and he would terminate the "bull". Rodríguez represented Puerto Rico on 12 World Cup teams. In 1986, he won the Hispanic Recognition Award. In 1988, he was named "Replica's Hispanic Man of the Year".

=== Horse racing ===
Horse Racing is a sport which was first introduced to Puerto Rico by the Conquistadores. Horse Races continue to be a very popular sport in Puerto Rico til this day. During the earlier part of the 20th. century, races were held at El Comandante race track. Since 1972, El Nuevo Comandante now called "Hipodromo Camarero", in Canóvanas, has been the home of Puerto Rico's Sunday horse races, and of the annual Clasico del Caribe, a race that reunites important horses from many countries.

Notable jockeys include Miguel A. Rivera, who won the 1974 Preakness Stakes and 1974 Belmont Stakes aboard Little Current, and U.S. Racing Hall of Fame member, Angel Cordero, Jr. Cordero is one of the leading thoroughbred horse racing jockeys of all time in terms of wins. He was the first and only Puerto Rican jockey to win all three of the American Classic Races which consist of the Kentucky Derby, Preakness Stakes and the Belmont Stakes. Two of the most famous horses in Puerto Rican history were Camarero, a world record holder for consecutive wins, and 1976 Kentucky Derby winner, Bold Forbes.

=== Road running ===
Road running have long been a part of Puerto Rico's sporting tradition. Many important races are run annually in the island, including the Maraton de San Blas in Coamo, long considered one of the most important half marathon races in the world, and the Ponce Marathon.

The World's Best 10K (WB10K), also known as Maratón Teodoro Moscoso, is a 10K run celebrated in San Juan, Puerto Rico every year. It is certified by the Association of International Marathons and Road Races (AIMS) and by the International Amateur Athletic Federation (IAAF). The event was also the first race transmitted live through the Internet, with audio, video and results. WB10K was ranked among the 20 most competitive races in the world. Notable marathon runners include: Jorge "Peco" González and Hunga Maldonado.

=== Martial arts ===
Martial arts sports, especially karate, have had a marked ascent in popularity in Puerto Rico since the 1970s, when Bruce Lee and Jackie Chan movies were very popular among Puerto Rico's youth.

=== Motorsports ===
The Puerto Rico Grand Prix was a motor race held in Puerto Rico in 1962 and 2003.

=== Olympic-style wrestling ===
Jaime Espinal won a silver medal for Puerto Rico at the 84 kg Men's freestyle category at the 2012 Summer Olympics in London, earning Puerto Rico its second ever silver medal at the Olympics, its first since boxer Luis Ortiz in 1984, and its first Olympic medal in wrestling.

=== Professional wrestling ===
Professional wrestling has enjoyed much popularity in Puerto Rico for a long time. Matches have been televised since the 1960s, and multiple, non televised matches are held each week across the island. World Wrestling Council is the main wrestling promoter in Puerto Rico.

Famous Puerto Rican wrestlers have included Barrabas, Carlos Colón and his sons, Carlito and Primo Colon, Los Invaders, Savio Vega, WWF* Hall of Famer Pedro Morales, and Los Super Medicos. In addition, many World Wrestling Entertainment (WWE, formerly WWF) stars, such as Randy Savage, and Ric Flair fought in Puerto Rico before. Women's wrestling has been gaining popularity in Puerto Rico since the 1990s with performers like La Tigresa, and Black Rose.

Two Puerto Ricans have been inducted into the WWE Hall of Fame. They are Pedro Morales (1995) and Carlos Colon (2014).

=== Sailing ===
Sailing as a sport has picked up in popularity in Puerto Rico since the middle 1990s, under the leadership of Enrique Figueroa and his wife, Carla Malatrasi. The pair have combined to win many international medals, and they competed at the 2000 Olympic Games. Figueroa also participated at the 1992 Olympics. On 2 February 2004, Figueroa and teammate Jorge Hernández, won the Olympic Games Rolex Regatta. They were named champions by topping 29 entries in the tornado fleet. The regatta winners had their sights set on the 2004 Olympics and Paralympic Games in Athens, Greece. 503 sailors participated with a fleet of 323 boats representing 39 nations. Figueroa went to the 2004 Olympic Games and represented Puerto Rico.

=== Fútbol (soccer) ===
The sport known as "soccer" in the United States, is also known and referred to as "Fútbol" or in the Spanish language as "balompié".

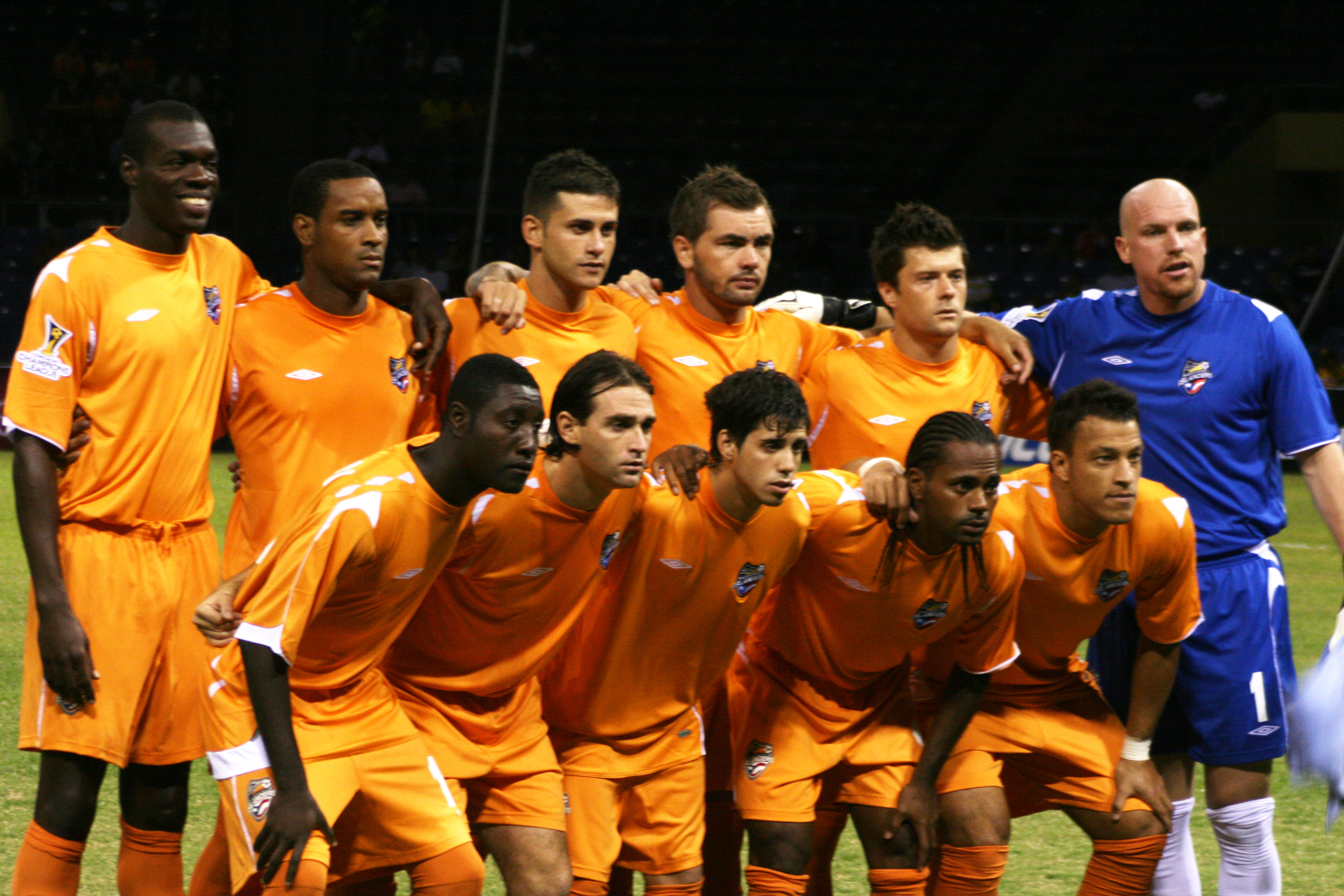
Line-up of the Puerto Rico Islanders as of 2008–09

Fútbol, unlike in many of the other Latin American countries, mainly because of the strong American culture influence on the Island, did not enjoy high popularity during the 20th century. But since the new millennium it has slowly increased its fan base on the island. Puerto Rico has a FIFA sponsored federation, the Federación Puertorriqueña de Fútbol and a Senior National Team which is ranked 106 by FIFA. Puerto Rico has only made it as far as the second round or regional play for a World Cup Qualifier, this was in 2008 when it beat Dominican Republic 1–0 in the first round and lost against Honduras in the second round with an aggregate score of 6–2.

Puerto Rico currently has a professional league called the Puerto Rico Soccer League which was founded in 2008 and is composed of 8 teams. It also had the Puerto Rico Islanders, which played in the North American Soccer League, the second tier of the American Soccer Pyramid. The team has been defunct since 2012; however, in June 2015 a new NASL team, Puerto Rico FC, was announced. In 2017, Puerto Rico Sol became the first women's pro soccer club in the Caribbean.

The following are among the players who have played for Puerto Rico: Héctor Ramos, Alexis Rivera Curet, Andrés Cabrero. There are several other Puerto Rican players or players of Puerto Rican descent playing abroad in foreign leagues.

=== Softball ===
Women's softball has enjoyed certain popularity in Puerto Rico. The women's national softball team has won many international events and participated at many Olympics.

Lisa Fernandez has represented the United States as member of the U.S. Women's Olympic Softball Team, winning gold medals in the 1996 Olympics in Atlanta, Georgia, 2000 Olympics in Sydney, Australia and in the 2004 Olympics in Athens, Greece. She established a women's softball record when she struck out 25 members of the women's Australian Olympic Softball Team. Ivelisse Echevarría who in 2003 was inducted into the International Softball Federation Hall of Fame is also considered by many to be the greatest pitcher born in Puerto Rico. Ten Puerto Ricans have been inducted into the International Softball Federation Hall of Fame so far.

The ten Puerto Ricans in International Softball Federation Hall of Fame are: Juan Pachot, Carlos Velasquez Class of 1997; Ismael "Chavalillo" Delgado, Jorge Tanco, Alejandro "Junior" Cruz Class of 1993 and Ivelisse Echevarria, Betty Segarra, Clara Vazquez, Jose "Tuto" Agosto, Rafi Serrano Class of 2003.

Softball Superior Nacional, a semi-professional women's softball league, exists in Puerto Rico.

=== Swimming (competitive) ===
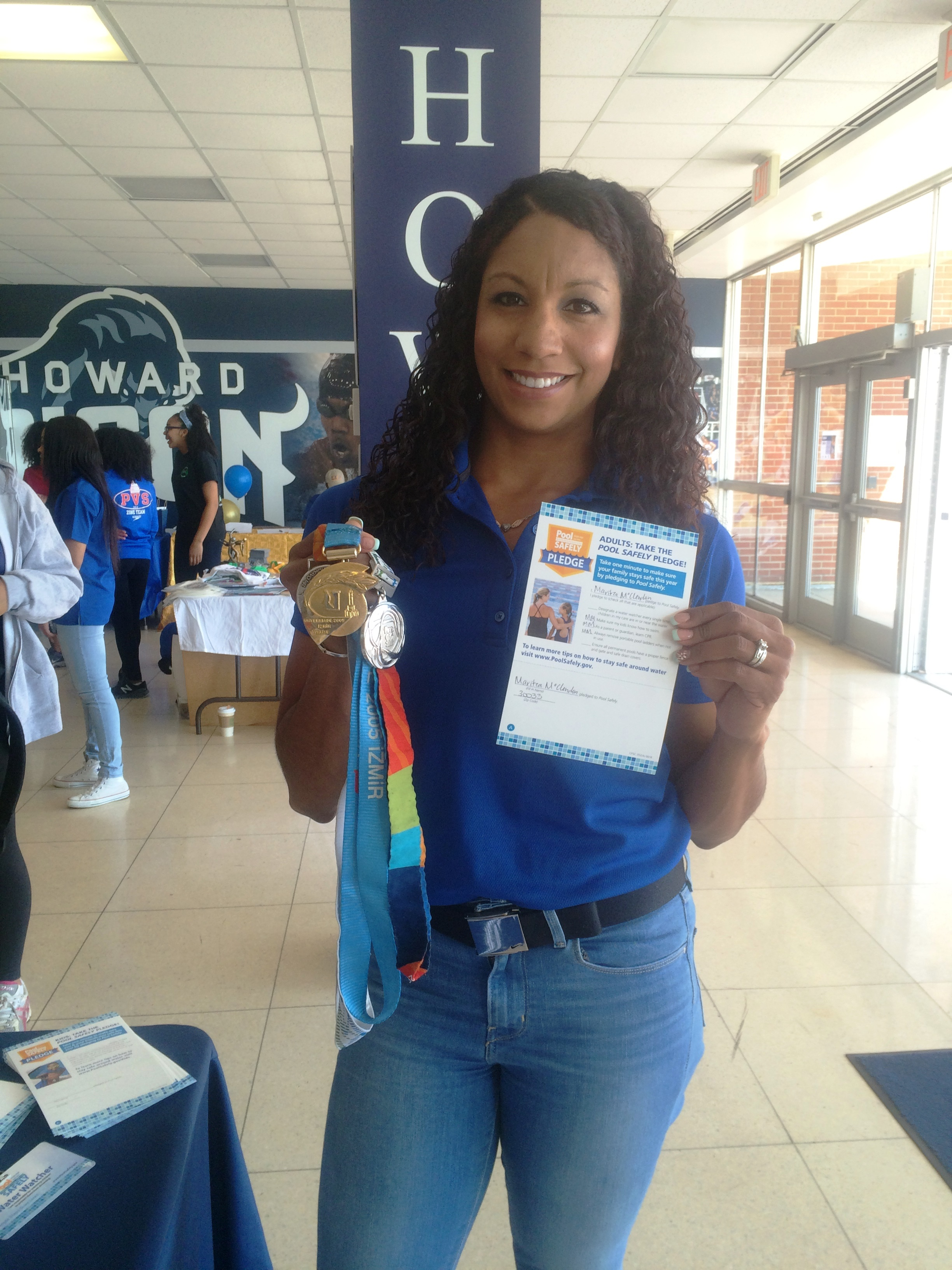
Olympic Medalist Maritza Correia

Jesus "Jesse" Vassallo is considered by many to be the greatest swimmer to have been born in Puerto Rico. In 1997, he became the first and so far the only Puerto Rican to be inducted into the International Swimming Hall of Fame. He currently heads the Puerto Rico Swimming Federation.

In 1966, 17-year-old Anita Lallande set a new record in the Central American and Caribbean Games celebrated in San Juan, when she won a total of 10 gold medals.

Fernando Cañales was a 100-meter freestyle finalist in the 1978 Berlin World Championships, earning a 5th place. He was the "first" Puerto Rican swimmer to final in the World Championships. He earned 5 gold medals and 1 silver medal during the 1978 Central American Championships in Medellín, Colombia. He became the first Puerto Rican to medal in the Pan American Games by winning silver in the 100 meters free in 1979 (San Juan, Puerto Rico) and repeating that feat in 1983 (Caracas, Venezuela).

Maritza Correia, is the first black Puerto Rican woman in history to make the U.S. Olympic Swimming Team. She earned a silver medal swimming prelims of the 400m free relay at the 2004 Olympic Games celebrated in Athens, Greece.

Years after the demolition of the Escambrón Swimming Complex, San Juan Mayor Jorge Santini opened the new roofed San Juan Natatorium, developed by San Juan Sports Director María Elena Batista, herself a former Olympic Swimmer. The official opening of the San Juan Natatorium was 15 December 2006. A second natatorium was scheduled to open in time for the 2010 Central American and Caribbean Games in Mayagüez.

On 19 May 2012, Orlando Fernández, also known as "The Puerto Rican Aquaman", became the first Puerto Rican to swim across the Strait of Gibraltar.

=== Tennis ===
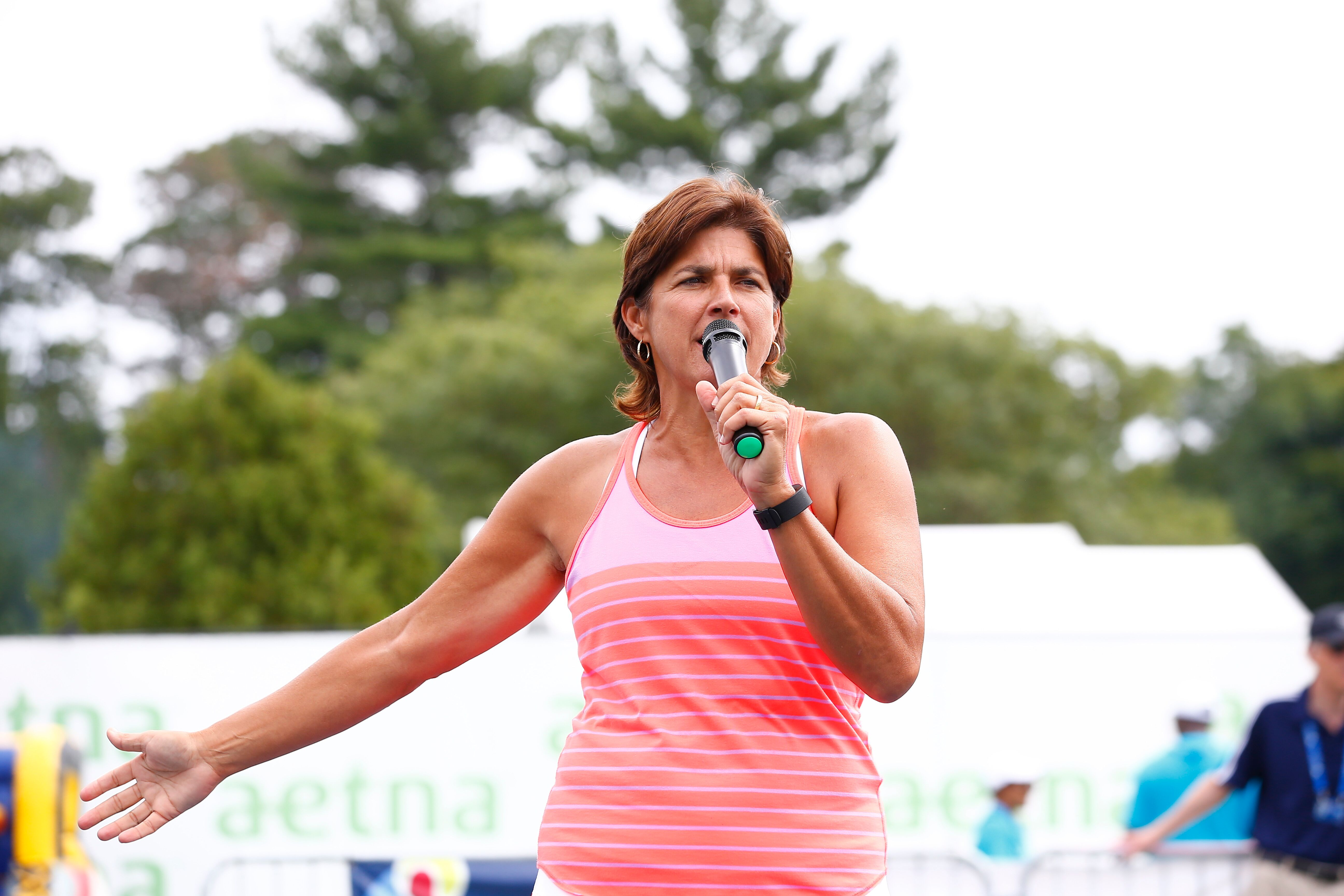
Gigi Fernandez, as a tennis ambassador, speaking at a Hispanic Engagement Tennis Event

Tennis is not very popular as a fan sport in Puerto Rico, but many Puerto Ricans practice it as a means of exercise. The 1984 television match between Martina Navratilova and Gigi Fernández was one of the most watched events of the year in Puerto Rican television. Gigi Fernández is arguably Puerto Rico's most famous tennis player ever, having won doubles championships in Grand Slam tournaments, including Wimbledon, winning gold medals for the USA doubles team in the 1992 and 1996 Olympics, being ranked no. 1 in the world for women's doubles tournaments, and being ranked among the top 30 singles players for most of her career. She is widely considered to be one of the greatest doubles players of all time.

Kristina Brandi is the first Puerto Rican tennis player to win an Olympic tennis match representing Puerto Rico. Brandi represented Puerto Rico in the 2004 Olympics, where she beat Jelena Kostanić from Croatia (7–5 and 6–1).

Charlie Pasarell was another noted Puerto Rican Tennis player. He lost to Pancho Gonzalez in 1969, in the second longest singles match by number of games before the introduction of the tiebreaker. It took Pancho Gonzales 112 games to defeat Charlie Pasarell in the first round 22–24, 1–6, 16–14, 6–3, 11–9.

Rafael Jordan was a player that many considered had potential to become a men's professional tour champion, but he died after an automobile accident during the mid-1990s.

Monica Puig became the first person to win an Olympic gold medal for Puerto Rico at the 2016 Summer Olympics. She defeated Germany's Angelique Kerber in the women's singles tennis final.

=== Track and field ===
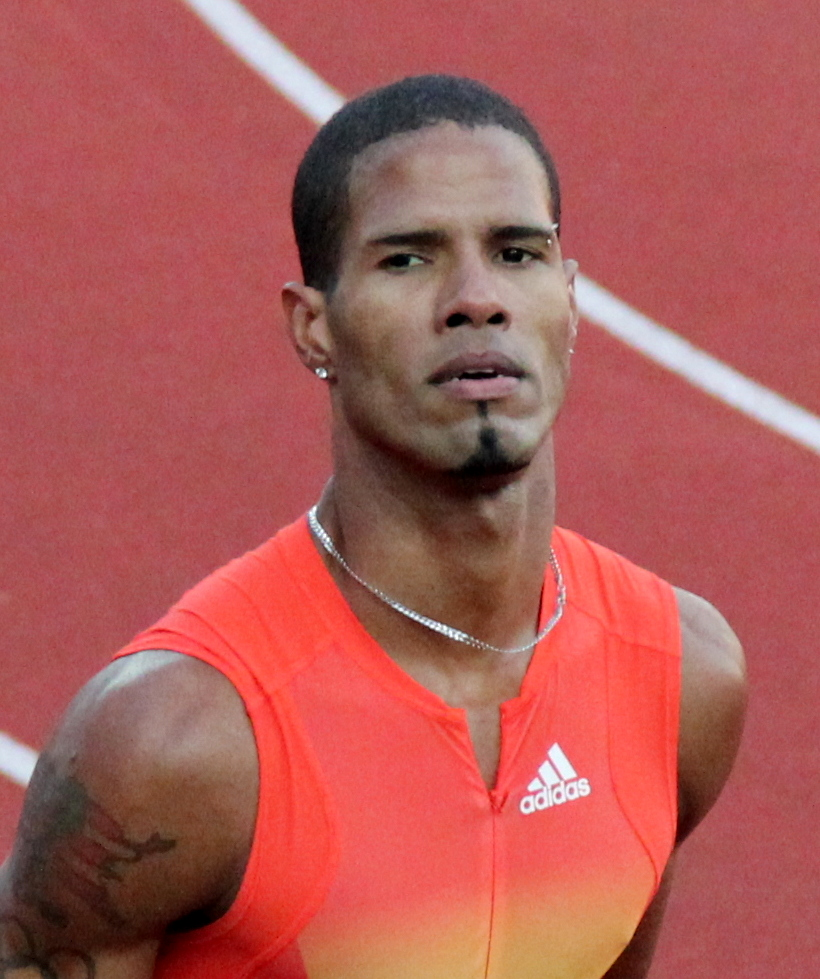
Javier Culson

Track and Field, also known as athletics, has been another noteworthy sport in Puerto Rico, with Puerto Rican runners, hurlers and throwers have participated at the Olympic and Paralympic Games with two and five medals, respectively, as of 2021. Most schools base their field days only on track and field events. Enrique Laguerre held it in high regard for its nature as a "fair [or loyal] competition". It is taken to be one of the sports that should be considered outside of the traditional baseball, volleyball and basketball offerings, for children with attention deficit hyperactivity disorder, as "the child manages to function better in sports where the emphasis is on improving their own performance". Famous Puerto Rican track and fielders include Rebekah Colberg and Angelita Lind.

Juan Juarbe Juarbe, who would later serve as Pedro Albizu Campos' personal secretary, was the first Puerto Rican to participate in any international sporting event, competing in the 1930 Central American and Caribbean Games, and the first to win a gold medal at an international track and field competition.

Rebekah Colberg, considered the "Mother of Women's Sports in Puerto Rico", was the Puerto Rico tennis champion for fourteen consecutive years, from 1932 till 1946. In 1938, she won two gold medals at the IV Central American and Caribbean Games, celebrated in Panama, in the discus and javelin events. In 1946, when the games were celebrated in Mexico, she won a gold medal in softball. While studying for her master's degree at Columbia University, she was in the university's field hockey and lacrosse championship teams. She was also a member of the undefeated women's basketball team of the University of Mexico.

Even though Juan "Papo" Franceschi had been a drug addict at one point in his life, he set several national records on the track and had a street named after him is nis native San Antón, Ponce. However, his name is not part of the Francisco "Pancho" Coimbre sports museum.

Heriberto Cruz Mejil, who as a kid, lacking access to a running track, used to run from the Guánica pier to the Caña Gorda baths. He went on to win silver and gold at the 110 metre hurdle event in the 1962 Kingston and 1966 San Juan Central American Caribbean Games, respectively, beating the then-fourth best runner in the world Víctor Maldonado in the latter. After which, he retired at age 27. Additionally, he was a LAI champion three consecutive years, competing at the Justas 110 metre hurdle, high jump and 4 x 400 metre relay events. Both his hometown's track and a tournament bear his name.

Professional baseball player Roberto Clemente was Julio Vizcarrondo Coronado high school's most valuable player for three consecutive years, and was described as "excellent in the sport of track and field." While Julio "Buyín" Camacho Mattei, who is better known for his professional volleyball career, also competed in track and field events, among other sports. Eduardo Hernández, who played for the Adjuntas Giants baseball team, was part of the Colegio Ponceño's track and field team.

Angelita Lind, often called the "Angel of Puerto Rico", has represented the island and participated in three Central American and Caribbean Games (CAC) and won two gold medals, three silver medals and one bronze medal. She also participated in three Pan American Games and in the 1984 Olympics celebrated in Los Angeles, California.

The 2010 Central American and Caribbean Games athletics competitions were held at the Mayagüez Athletics Stadium.

Puerto Rican athletes participated in the 2011 Special Olympics World Summer Games, competing in the 12, 50, 100, 200, 400, 800 and 1,500 metres, as well as relay and shot put.

A survey in 2011 found that 75% of Puerto Rican university student athletes that attended private institutions of higher learning partake in this discipline.

Eight of the 23 athletes competing at the 2012 London Olympics, were track and field: Jamele Mason (400 metre hurdles), Eric Alejandro (400 metre hurdles), Beverly Ramos (3000 metre steeplechase), Enrique Llanos (110 metre hurdles), Héctor Cotto (110 metre hurdles), Miguel López (100 metre), Wesley Vázquez (800 metre) and Samuel Vázquez (1500 metros). Additionally, Javier Culson, who had become the first Puerto Rican track and field artist to be a flagbearer since the 1948 London Olympics, made history by becoming the first Puerto Rican track and field runner in an Olympic Game, to win the bronze medal at the 2012 London Olympics. He won it in the 400 metre hurdle competition.

The Department of Education has pushed for field day events to not be limited to track and field since 2015, arguing that "it must allow the participation of all students regardless of differences and interests."

In 2019, 16 track and field athletes competed in the Lima Pan American Games, of which 12 achieved minimum marks to qualify.

Puerto Rico governor Pedro Pierluisi named retired long jumper and the University of Puerto Rico at Mayagüez's Sport Affairs Director and lead coach Ray J. Quiñones Vázquez as Secretary of Sports and Recreation of Puerto Rico.

The first event held at the Basilio Rodríguez Cruz Athletic Track, Carolina's running track, after its million-dollar recontrsuction after hurricanes Irma and María was the XV Spring Athletics Classic (Clásico Primaveral de Atletismo) a March 2021 Olympic and Paralympic qualifying event.

A change in the qualifications for the athletic events at the 2020 Olympics by World Athletics, the sport's international federation, making the first criteria to qualify time or minimum marks, and the second ranking, was met with criticism in Puerto Rico. As most ranking events are held in Europe, making it less accessible from athletes from other continents. The ranking criterion is used to fill up vacant spaces. However, all four athletes whom met minimum marks, Jasmine Camacho-Quinn and Wesley Vázquez, Ryan Sánchez (the only debut in the quartet) and Andrés Arroyo, were all eventually chosen and partook in the subsequent Olympics, arriving on 25 July to the Olympic Village. The latter three all competed in the same event, making it the first time that Puerto Rico had three athletes competing at the 800 metre event. Nevertheless, other athletes, such as Rachelle de Orbeta, Luis Joel Castro, Grace Claxton and Ayden Owens failed to enter based on missing the ranking cutoff.

Jasmine Camacho-Quinn, who had debuted at the 2016 Rio Games, competed in the 100 metre hurdle at the 2020 Tokyo Olympics, winning gold and setting an Olympic record, becoming the first Puerto rican to ever do so and the second Puerto Rican ever to win a gold medal while representing Puerto Rico. At 12.26 seconds, her personal best, she tied for the fourth fastest time in history. By winning the gold, she climbed to the top spot of the World Athletics Rankings in her event.

During the 2020 Summer Paralympics opening ceremony, both flagbearers of Puerto Rico's delegation, Yaimillie Díaz Colón and Carmelo Rivera Fuentes, who competed in the amputee and intellectual disabilities classifications, respectively, were track and field athletes.

=== Volleyball ===
The Puerto Rican Volleyball Federation was founded in 1958, the first men's tournament organized was the 'Torneo Preolimpico'. The federation's first president was Jose L. Purcell. Ten years later the Women's League was established.

Long considered the dormant sport among major sports in Puerto Rico, Volleyball has enjoyed much popularity since the 1990s, both in its professional and beach volleyball versions. Puerto Rico's Liga Superior de Voleibol has thrived in recent years, both in the men's and women's tournaments.

In 1970, most of Puerto Rico's national women's volleyball team's members were killed when a plane that was flying them to San Juan, Puerto Rico from the Dominican Republic crashed shortly after take-off.

In 1997, debut of foreign player in Women League. The most dominated are Laura Salinas from Monterrey, Mexico, lead the Mexico national team to several international competition. The foreign player debut in Women's League in 2000.

Some of Puerto Rico's famous volleyball players are Willie De Jesus, Raúl Papaleo and Héctor Soto. Papaleo and Ramón 'Monchito' Hernández participated in 2004 Olympic Games in Athens in Beach Volleyball, first ever volleyball team in the Island Olympic history. Laura Daniela Lloreda, meanwhile, is a Puerto Rican who played in Mexico's national volleyball team.

Héctor "Picky" Soto is the first Latin American player that has led the scoring in the World Championship's history. Soto won the Best Scorer award in 2006 FIVB World Championship in Japan and 2007 FIVB World Cup in Japan. During the World Cup, he scored 43 point against Korea, in the process establishing a scoring record. Outside of his international performance, Soto has played in the professional leagues of Italy, Tunisia, Japan and Russia.

=== Lacrosse ===
For the first time, Puerto Rico will feature a national team at the 2022 Under-19 World Lacrosse Championships.

=== Ice hockey ===
First formed in 2020, Puerto Rico's national ice hockey team has competed in multiple regional tournaments featuring other Latin American and Caribbean teams. The Puerto Rican Ice Hockey Association became an IIHF associate member in 2022 and the sport continues to grow as more players register with the organization.

== Stadiums in Puerto Rico ==
Stadium	Country	Capacity
Hiram Bithorn Stadium	Puerto Rico	18,264
Juan Ramón Loubriel Stadium	Puerto Rico	12,500
Mayagüez Athletics Stadium	Puerto Rico	12,175

== See also ==
- List of Major League Baseball players from Puerto Rico
- List of Puerto Ricans - Sports
- List of Puerto Rico-related topics
- World's Best 10K (Maratón Teodoro Moscoso)
- International Wrestling Association
- World Wrestling Council
- History of women in Puerto Rico
