= 2016 PRAFL season =

- Duration: April 03, 2016 – May 22, 2016

2016 Championship
- Date: June 12, 2016
- Venue: Cataño's American Football Field, Cataño
- Champions: University Gardens Seahawks

PRAFL seasons seasons
- ← 2015 2017 →

The 2016 PRAFL season will be the 3rd season of the semi-pro Puerto Rico American Football League. Officially, it is the 3rd season of the league. Cataño is scheduled to host the 3rd Championship on June 12. The regular season will begin April 3 and end on May 22.

== Standings ==
Note: GP = Games Played, W = Wins, L = Losses, T = Ties, PF = Points For, PA = Points Against, Pts = Points, F/R = Final Record Including Playoffs

Teams in bold are in playoff positions.
X – clinched playoff berth and plays first round.
Y – clinched first/second place and first round bye to semi-finals

2016 PRAFL standings
Team	GP	W	L	T	PF	PA	Pts	F/R
**Y–University Gardens Seahawks**	7	7	0	0	360	17	18	9 - 0
**Y–San Juan Raiders**	7	6	1	0	236	75	14	7 - 2
**X–Carolina King Giants**	7	4	2	1	182	88	11	5- 3 -1
**X–Bayamon Wolfpack**	7	4	2	1	117	122	11	5- 3 -1
**X–Juncos Broncos**	7	3	4	0	77	121	6	3 - 5
**X–Gurabo Packers**	7	2	5	0	78	211	4	2 - 6
Cataño Punishers	7	1	6	0	44	175	2	1 - 6
Peñuelas Ravens	7	0	7	0	14	299	0	0 - 7

== PRAFL playoffs ==
=== Playoff bracket ===
May 29, 2016: 1st Round
4.	**Bayamon Wolfpack**	7
5.	Juncos Broncos	6
**3.**	**Carolina King Giants**	30
6.	Gurabo Packers	8

June 5, 2016: Semi-Finals
**1.**	**University Gardens Seahawks**	44
4.	Bayamon Wolfpack	2
**2.**	**San Juan Raiders**	9
3.	Carolina King Giants	0

June 12, 2016 : 3rd Championship; Cataño's American Football Field – Cataño
**1.**	**University Gardens Seahawks**	23
2.	San Juan Raiders	6

*-Team won in Overtime.
