= 2014 PRAFL season =

- Duration: March 9, 2014 – May 25, 2014

2014 Championship
- Date: June 8, 2014
- Venue: Cataño's American Football Field Cataño

PRAFL seasons seasons
- 2015 →

The 2014 PRAFL season will be the 1st season of the semi-pro Puerto Rican American football league. Officially, it is the 1st season of the league. Cataño is scheduled to host the 1st Championship on June 8. The regular season will begin March 9 and end on May 25.

== Standings ==
Note: GP = Games Played, W = Wins, L = Losses, T = Ties, PF = Points For, PA = Points Against, Pts = Points, F/R = Final Record Including Playoffs

Teams in bold are in playoff positions.
X – clinched playoff berth and plays first round.
Y – clinched first/second place and first round bye to semi-finals

2014 PRAFL standings
Team	GP	W	L	T	PF	PA	Pts	F/R
**Y–Cataño Trojans**	8	7	1	0	260	47	18	9 - 1
**Y–Guaynabo Mustangs**	8	7	1	0	215	84	16	8 - 2
**X–Carolina King Giants**	8	5	3	0	122	144	10	5 - 4
**X–Juncos Broncos**	8	4	4	0	117	201	93	4 - 5
Bayamon Wolfpack	8	3	5	0	124	150	6	3 - 5
Hatillo Eagles	8	2	6	0	34	123	4	2 - 6
Ponce Renegades	8	0	8	0	0	345	0	0 - 8

== PRAFL playoffs ==
=== Playoff bracket ===
June 1, 2014: Semi-Finals; Cataño's American Football Field – Cataño
**1.**	**Cataño Trojans**	50
4.	Juncos Broncos	8
**2.**	**Guaynabo Mustangs**	28
4.	Carolina King Giants	6

June 8, 2014 : 2nd Championship; Cataño's American Football Field – Cataño
1.	**Cataño Trojans**	30
2.	Guaynabo Mustangs	12

*-Team won in Overtime.
