= 2015 PRAFL season =

2015 Championship
- Date: May 31, 2015
- Venue: Cataño's American Football Field, Cataño
- Champions: Baldrich Mustangs

PRAFL seasons seasons
- 2014 2016

The 2015 PRAFL season was the second season of the semi-pro Puerto Rican American football league. Officially, it is the 2nd season of the league. Cataño's American Football Field, Cataño, was scheduled to host the 2nd Championship on May 31. The regular season began on March 1 and ended on May 8.

== Standings ==
Note: GP = Games Played, W = Wins, L = Losses, T = Ties, PF = Points For, PA = Points Against, Pts = Points, F/R = Final Record (Including Playoffs)

Teams in bold are in playoff positions.
X – clinched playoff berth and plays first round.
Y – clinched first/second place and first round bye to semi-finals

2016 PRAFL standings
Team	GP	W	L	T	PF	PA	Pts	F/R
**Y–University Gardens Seahawks**	8	8	0	0	278	36	18	9 - 1
**Y–Baldrich Mustangs-C**	8	6	2	0	224	50	16	8 - 2
**X–Bayamon Wolfpack**	7	5	2	0	82	83	10	5 - 3
**X–Carolina King Giants**	8	3	5	0	78	166	6	3 - 6
Juncos Broncos	8	3	5	0	72	146	6	3 - 5
Cataño Punishers	7	1	6	0	32	210	2	1 - 6
Hatillo Eagles	8	1	7	0	54	129	2	1 - 7

== PRAFL playoffs ==
=== Playoff bracket ===
May 24, 2015: Semi-Finals; Cataño's American Football Field – Cataño
**1.**	**University Gardens Seahawks**	22
4.	Carolina King Giants	0
**2.**	**Baldrich Mustangs**	16
4.	Bayamon Wolfpack	0

May 31, 2015 : 2nd Championship; Cataño's American Football Field – Cataño
1.	University Gardens Seahawks	8
'**2.**	**Baldrich Mustangs**	24

* – Team won in overtime.
