= List of PRAFL seasons =

This is a list of Puerto Rico American Football League (PRAFL) seasons, including seasons in Puerto Rico football prior to the PRAFL's founding in 2014.

== 2010s ==
2014 PRAFL season | 2015 PRAFL season | 2016 PRAFL season
