= List of PRAFL champions =

== PRAFL Championship (2014–2018) ==
Numbers in parentheses in the table are Championship appearances, as of the date of that Championships and are used as follows:

- Winning team and Losing team columns indicate the number of times that team has appeared in the Championship as well as each respective teams' Super Bowl record to date.
- Venue column indicates number of times that stadium has hosted the Championship.
- City column indicates number of times that that metropolitan area has hosted the Championship.

Game	Date	Winning team	Score	Losing team	Venue	City	Attendance	Ref
I	June 8, 2014	Cataño Trojans (1, 1–0)	30 - 12	Guaynabo Mustangs (1, 0–1)	Cataño's American Football Field	Cataño, Puerto Rico		
II	May 31, 2015	Baldrich Mustangs (1, 1–0)	24 - 8	University Gardens Seahawks (1, 0–1)	Cataño's American Football Field	Cataño, Puerto Rico		
III	June 12, 2016	University Gardens Seahawks (2, 1–1)	23 - 6	San Juan Raiders (1, 0–1)	Cataño's American Football Field	Cataño, Puerto Rico		

== Championship appearances by team ==
In the sortable table below, teams are ordered first by number of appearances, then by number of wins, and finally by year of first appearance. In the "Season(s)" column, bold years indicate winning seasons.

Appearances	Team	Wins	Losses	Winning percentage	Season(s)
2	University Gardens Seahawks	1	1	.500	2015, 2016
1	Cataño Punishers/Trojans	1	0	1.000	2014
1	Baldrich Mustangs	1	0	1.000	2015
1	Guaynabo Mustangs	0	1	.000	2014
1	San Juan Raiders	0	1	.000	2016
0	Bayamon Wolfpack	0	0	–	N/A
0	Carolina King Giants	0	0	–	N/A
0	Gurabo Packers	0	0	–	N/A
0	Juncos Broncos	0	0	–	N/A
0	Peñuelas Ravens	0	0	–	N/A
