= Softball Superior Nacional =

Semi-pro women's softball league

Softball Superior Nacional (SSN)
- Current season, competition or edition: 2016 SSN season
- Sport: Softball
- Motto: ¡Pura Pasión! (Pure Passion)
- No. of teams: 10
- Country: Puerto Rico
- Most recent champion: Jueyeras de Muanabo (7th title)
- Most titles: Jueyeras de Muanabo (7 titles)
- Broadcasters: WAPA 2 Deportes; DirecTV

The Softball Superior Nacional (SSN) is a semi-pro women's softball league in Puerto Rico.

Currently contested by 10 teams, it has nevertheless had presence in several cities of Puerto Rico.

== List of teams ==
Locations of teams participating in 2016 SSN season

Team	Location	Stadium	Capacity
Bucaneras de Arroyo	Arroyo, Puerto Rico	Coliseum	0
Industriales de Barceloneta	Barceloneta, Puerto Rico	Coliseum	0
Ganageras de Hatillo	Hatillo, Puerto Rico	Coliseum	0
Valencianas de Juncos	Juncos, Puerto Rico	Coliseum	0
Jueyeras de Maunabo	Maunabo, Puerto Rico	Coliseum	0
Cangrejeras de Roosevelt	Roosevelt, Puerto Rico	Coliseum	0
Wild Crabs de Maunabo	Maunabo, Puerto Rico	Coliseum	0
Capitanas de Arecibo	Arecibo, Puerto Rico	Coliseum	0
Samaritanas de San Lorenzo	San Lorenzo, Puerto Rico	Coliseum	0
Brujas de Guayama	Guayama, Puerto Rico	Coliseum	0

== Current teams ==
This current league organization features 10 teams in a single division.

Team	City	Field	Capacity	Founded	First season	Head coach
Softball Superior Nacional
Capitanas de Arecibo	Arecibo, PR		00			
Bucaneras de Arroyo	Arroyo, PR	Example	00	Example	Example	Example
Industriales de Barceloneta	Barceloneta, PR	Example	00	Example	Example	Example
Brujas de Guayama	Guayama, PR	Example	00	Example	Example	Example
Ganageras de Hatillo	Hatillo, PR	Example	00	Example	Example	Example
Valencianas de Juncos	Juncos, PR	Example	00	Example	Example	Example
Jueyeras de Maunabo	Maunabo, PR	Example	00	Example	Example	Example
Wild Crabs de Maunabo	Maunabo, PR	Example	00	Example	Example	Example
Cangejeras de Roosevelt	Roosevelt, PR	Example	00	Example	Example	Example
Samaritanas de San Lorenzo	San Lorenzo, PR	Example	00	Example	Example	Example

=== Defunct teams ===
Former Teams
Team	City	Stadium	Capacity	First season	Final Season
Arrcostadas de Trujillo Alto	Trujillo Alto, PR	Example	000	Example	Example
Lancheras de Cataño	Cataño, PR	Example	000	Example	Example
Capitalinas de San Juan	San Juan, PR	Example	000	Example	Example
Jueyeas de Muanabo	Maunabo, PR	Example	000	Example	Example
Conquistadoras de Guaynabo	Guaynabo, PR	Example	000	Example	Example
Toritas de Cayey	Cayey, PR		000		

== Championships by franchise(all-time) ==
=== Recent champions ===
Results{}
Year	Champion	Sub-Champions
2000	Lancheras de Cataño	N/A
2001	Conquistadoras de Guaynabo	Toritas de Ceyey
2002	Lancheras de Cataño	Arrecostadas de Trujillo Alto
2003	Lancheras de Cataño	Capitalinas de San Juan
2004	Conquistadoras de Guaynabo	Capitalinas de San Juan
2005	Capitalinas de San Juan	Capitalinas de San Juan
2006	Jueyeas de Muanabo	Jueyeras de Muanabo
2007	Conquistadoras de Guaynabo	Toritas de Cayey
2008	Valencianas de Juncos	Valencianas de Juncos
2009	Jueyeras de Muanabo	Conquistadoras de Guaynabo
2010	Jueyeras de Muanabo	Capitanas de Arecibo
2011	Jueyeras de Muanabo	Conquistadoras de Guaynabo
2012	Jueyeras de Muanabo	Valencianas de Juncos
2013	Jueyeras de Muanabo	Capitanas de Arecibo
2014	Cangejeras de Roosevelt	Capitanas de Arecibo
2015	Jueyeras de Muanabo	Valencianas de Juncos
