= Puerto Rico American Football League =

Semi-pro American football league in Puerto Rico

- Most recent season or competition: 2017 (or part of 2018)
- Sport: American football
- Founded: 1984
- First season: 2014
- Folded: 2018
- Commissioner: Richard "Payton" Millien
- No. of teams: 8
- Country: Puerto Rico
- Last champion: University Gardens Seahawks (1st title)
- Most titles: University Gardens Seahawks (1); Balrich Mustangs (1); Cataño Trojans (1)
- Level on pyramid: 1
- Website: http://www.prafl.com/

The Puerto Rico American Football League (PRAFL) is a semi-pro American football league in Puerto Rico. The PRAFL is the highest level of competition in Puerto Rican American football league pyramid, a form of gridiron football closely related to American football. Its eight current teams, which are located in eight separate cities.

== History ==
Puerto Rico American Football League was founded in 1984.

== Clubs ==
The PRAFL consists of 8 clubs playing in a single conference.

=== Active teams ===
Club	City/area	Stadium	Capacity	First season	Head coach
|Puerto Rico American Football League
†	Bayamon, PR	Complejo Deportivo Calcaño Alicea	#	2014	–
Carolina pirates †	Carolina, PR	Wal-Mart Football stadium	20,000	2024	Luis Martinez
Cataño Punishers *†	Cataño, PR	Cataño's American Football Field	#	2014	–
Gurabo Packers	Gurabo, PR	Gurabo Sports Complex	#	2016	–
Juncos Broncos †	Juncos, PR	Complejo Deportivo Pista Atletica	#	2014	–
Peñuelas Ravens	Peñuelas, PR	Pista Atletica De Peñuelas	#	2016	–
San Juan Sharks	San Juan, PR	Polideportivo Rebekah Colberg	#	2016	–
University Gardens Seahawks	San Juan, PR	–	#	2015	–
^{*} denotes that the club has relocated/renamed at some point in its existence^{†} denotes that the club was a founding member of the NFL

=== Defunct teams ===
Club	City/area	Stadium	Years active
Former teams
Guaynabo Mustangs †	Guaynabo, PR	Pepito Bonano Stadium	2014
Hatillo Eagles †	Hatillo, PR	Pancho Dieda Sports Complex	2014–2015
Ponce Renegades †	Ponce, PR	–	2014
Baldrich Mustangs	Puerto Rico	–	2015

== Season format ==
The PRAFL season format consists of a seven-week regular season (each team plays 7 games), and a four-team single-elimination playoff culminating in the league's championship game.

== See also ==
- List of PRAFL champions
- List of PRAFL seasons
