= 2006 European Athletics Championships – Men's 3000 metres steeplechase =

Men's 3000 metres steeplechase at the European Athletics Championships

The men's 3000 metres steeplechase at the 2006 European Athletics Championships were held at the Ullevi on August 9 and August 11.

Finland's Keskisalo takes surprise gold after two injury-filled years. He ran behind the whole pack until the last lap, during which he sprinted on the back straight to take the win ahead of Spain's José Luis Blanco and France's Bouabdellah Tahri.

== Medalists ==
| Gold | Silver | Bronze |
|---|---|---|
| Jukka Keskisalo; Finland | José Luis Blanco; Spain | Bouabdellah Tahri; France |

== Schedule ==
| Date | Time | Round |
|---|---|---|
| August 9, 2006 | 10:10 | Semifinals |
| August 11, 2006 | 19:25 | Final |

== Results ==
| KEY: | q | Fastest non-qualifiers | Q | Qualified | NR | National record | PB | Personal best | SB | Seasonal best |

=== Heats ===
First 4 in each heat (Q) and the next 4 fastest (q) advance to the Final.

| Rank | Heat | Name | Nationality | Time | Notes |
|---|---|---|---|---|---|
| 1 | 2 | Antonio David Jiménez | Spain | 8:24.12 | Q |
| 2 | 2 | Bouabdellah Tahri | France | 8:24.38 | Q |
| 3 | 2 | Itai Maggidi | Israel | 8:25.04 | Q, NR |
| 4 | 2 | Radosław Popławski | Poland | 8:25.54 | Q |
| 5 | 2 | Mustafa Mohamed | Sweden | 8:26.66 | q |
| 6 | 2 | Günther Weidlinger | Austria | 8:27.53 | q |
| 7 | 2 | Jukka Keskisalo | Finland | 8:29.06 | q |
| 8 | 1 | Simon Vroemen | Netherlands | 8:29.62 | Q |
| 9 | 1 | José Luis Blanco | Spain | 8:30.26 | Q |
| 10 | 1 | César Pérez | Spain | 8:30.52 | Q |
| 11 | 1 | Martin Pröll | Austria | 8:31.34 | Q |
| 12 | 1 | Pavel Potapovich | Russia | 8:32.78 | q |
| 13 | 2 | Pieter Desmet | Belgium | 8:32.93 | |
| 14 | 2 | Andrey Kozhevnikov | Russia | 8:33.00 | |
| 15 | 1 | Ion Luchianov | Moldova | 8:34.86 | |
| 16 | 2 | Adam Bowden | United Kingdom | 8:35.79 | |
| 17 | 2 | Andrey Farnosov | Russia | 8:36.94 | |
| 18 | 1 | Tomasz Szymkowiak | Poland | 8:37.00 | |
| 19 | 1 | Matteo Villani | Italy | 8:39.66 | |
| 20 | 1 | Jermaine Mays | United Kingdom | 8:41.70 | |
| 21 | 2 | Vadym Slobodenyuk | Ukraine | 8:42.55 | |
| 22 | 1 | Mário Teixeira | Portugal | 8:43.14 | |
| 23 | 1 | Bjørnar Ustad Kristensen | Norway | 8:53.93 | |
| 24 | 1 | Mohamed-Khaled Belabbas | France | 9:01.62 | |
| 25 | 2 | Boštjan Buč | Slovenia | 9:13.90 | |
| | 1 | Vincent Le Dauphin | France | DNF | |

=== Final ===
| Rank | Name | Nationality | Time | Notes |
|---|---|---|---|---|
| 1st place, gold medalist(s) | Jukka Keskisalo | Finland | 8:24.89 | |
| 2nd place, silver medalist(s) | José Luis Blanco | Spain | 8:26.22 | |
| 3rd place, bronze medalist(s) | Bouabdellah Tahri | France | 8:27.15 | |
| 4 | Mustafa Mohamed | Sweden | 8:27.79 | |
| 5 | Antonio David Jiménez | Spain | 8:28.78 | |
| 6 | Radosław Popławski | Poland | 8:29.33 | |
| 7 | Günther Weidlinger | Austria | 8:29.54 | |
| 8 | César Pérez | Spain | 8:30.40 | |
| 9 | Martin Pröll | Austria | 8:35.69 | |
| 10 | Pavel Potapovich | Russia | 8:38.19 | |
| 11 | Itai Maggidi | Israel | 8:52.69 | |
| | Simon Vroemen | Netherlands | | DNS |
