= 2009 World Championships in Athletics – Men's 3000 metres steeplechase =

The Men's 3.000 metres Steeplechase at the 2009 World Championships in Athletics was held at the Olympic Stadium in Berlin, Germany, on August 16 and August 18, 2009. Keeping in line with previous major championships success, the four-man Kenyan team entered for the event contained a number of race favourites.

The Kenyans were led by the reigning World and Olympic champion Brimin Kipruto, followed by 2004 Olympic champion and world-leader Ezekiel Kemboi, and finally Olympic medallists Paul Kipsiele Koech and Richard Mateelong. Two French athletes offered the strongest possibility of beating the Kenyans, with Olympic silver medallist Mahiedine Mekhissi-Benabbad and European record holder Bouabdellah Tahri. Other possible medallists were the in-form Moroccan Jamel Chatbi and the European Champion Jukka Keskisalo.

After Mekhissi-Benabbad pulled up due to injury in the heats, the chance of a Kenyan podium sweep increased. All three heats were won by a Kenyan athlete, and Kenyan-born Tareq Mubarak Taher, who now competes for Bahrain, was the fastest non-Kenyan qualifier. Chatbi, who had finished second in his heat, became the first athlete of the championships to test positive for banned substances. His "A" sample showed traces of clenbuterol and he was withdrawn from the final.

In the final, South African Ruben Ramolefi lead early on, but he was soon overtaken by Koech and Kemboi. Around the halfway mark, a group of five athletes were leading the field: the four Kenyan runners and Frenchman Tahri. Defending champion Kipruto was the only one to fall away from the leading pack and Koech, Kemboi, Mateelong were the first to reach the home stretch. In a close finish, Kemboi won in 8:00.43, and Mateelong took the silver. Tahri made a strong run to the line to upset the Kenyan's podium sweep hopes, beating Koech to the bronze and setting a new European record in the process. The top four runners had all beaten Moses Kiptanui's fourteen-year-old Championship record in what was the fastest ever steeplechase race at the World Championships.

== Medalists ==
Gold	Silver	Bronze
Ezekiel Kemboi; Kenya	Richard Kipkemboi Mateelong; Kenya	Bouabdellah Tahri; France

== Records ==
Prior to the competition, the following records were as follows.

World record	Saif Saaeed Shaheen (QAT)	7:53.63	Brussels, Belgium	3 September 2004
Championship record	Moses Kiptanui (KEN)	8:04.16	Gothenburg, Sweden	11 August 1995
World leading	Ezekiel Kemboi (KEN)	7:58.85	Doha, Qatar	8 May 2009
African record	Brahim Boulami (MAR)	7:55.28	Brussels, Belgium	24 August 2001
Asian record	Saif Saaeed Shaheen (QAT)	7:53.63	Brussels, Belgium	3 September 2004
North American record	Daniel Lincoln (USA)	8:08.82	Rome, Italy	14 July 2006
South American record	Wander do Prado Moura (BRA)	8:14.41	Mar del Plata, Argentina	22 March 1995
European record	Bouabdellah Tahri (FRA)	8:02.19	Metz, France	3 July 2009
Oceanian record	Peter Renner (NZL)	8:14.05	Koblenz, Switzerland	29 August 1984

== Qualification standards ==
A time	B time
8:23.00	8:33.50

== Schedule ==
Date	Time	Round
August 16, 2009	11:00	Heats
August 18, 2009	19:50	Final

== Results ==
=== Heats ===
Qualification: First 4 in each heat(Q) and the next 3 fastest(q) advance to the final.

Rank	Heat	Name	Nationality	Time	Notes
1	1	Richard Mateelong	Kenya	8:17.99	Q
2	2	Brimin Kipruto	Kenya	8:18.07	Q
3	1	Tareq Mubarak Taher	Bahrain	8:18.13	Q
4	1	Paul Kipsiele Koech	Kenya	8:18.16	Q
5	1	Roba Gary	Ethiopia	8:18.22	Q
6	2	Bouabdellah Tahri	France	8:18.23	Q
7	2	Ruben Ramolefi	South Africa	8:18.24	Q
8	2	Benjamin Kiplagat	Uganda	8:18.55	Q
9	1	Abubaker Ali Kamal	Qatar	8:18.95	q, SB
10	3	Ezekiel Kemboi	Kenya	8:19.36	Q
11	3	Yacob Jarso	Ethiopia	8:20.91	Q
12	2	Jukka Keskisalo	Finland	8:22.00	q
13	2	Mustafa Mohamed	Sweden	8:22.92	q
14	2	José Luis Blanco	Spain	8:24.07	
15	2	Krijn van Koolwijk	Belgium	8:24.22	SB
16	3	Eliseo Martín	Spain	8:24.29	Q
17	1	Abdelatif Chemlal	Morocco	8:25.68	
18	3	Ion Luchianov	Moldova	8:27.41	
19	1	Tomasz Szymkowiak	Poland	8:27.93	
20	3	Bjørnar Ustad Kristensen	Norway	8:28.49	SB
21	1	Mario Bazán	Peru	8:28.67	NR
22	1	Pieter Desmet	Belgium	8:31.81	
23	2	Ildar Minshin	Russia	8:33.89	
24	3	Steffen Uliczka	Germany	8:37.83	
25	3	Simon Ayeko	Uganda	8:37.86	
26	3	Yoshitaka Iwamizu	Japan	8:39.03	
27	3	Boštjan Buč	Slovenia	8:40.56	
28	1	Vincent Zouaoui-Dandrieaux	France	8:41.85	
29	3	Alberto Paulo	Portugal	8:43.13	
30	2	Rob Watson	Canada	8:44.73	
31	1	Per Jacobsen	Sweden	8:44.80	
32	3	Daniel Huling	United States	8:46.79	
33	1	Ángel Mullera	Spain	8:47.40	
34	2	Youcef Abdi	Australia	8:49.88	
35	2	Legese Lamiso	Ethiopia	8:51.63	
36	2	Joshua McAdams	United States	9:02.19	
	1	Kyle Alcorn	United States	DNF	
	3	Mahiedine Mekhissi-Benabbad	France	DNF	
DSQ	3	Jamel Chatbi	Morocco	8:20.26	Q

Key: DNF = Did not finish, NR = National record, Q = qualification by place in heat, q = qualification by overall place, SB = Seasonal best

DSQ - Disqualified (Chatbi disqualified due to violation of anti-doping rules)

=== Final ===
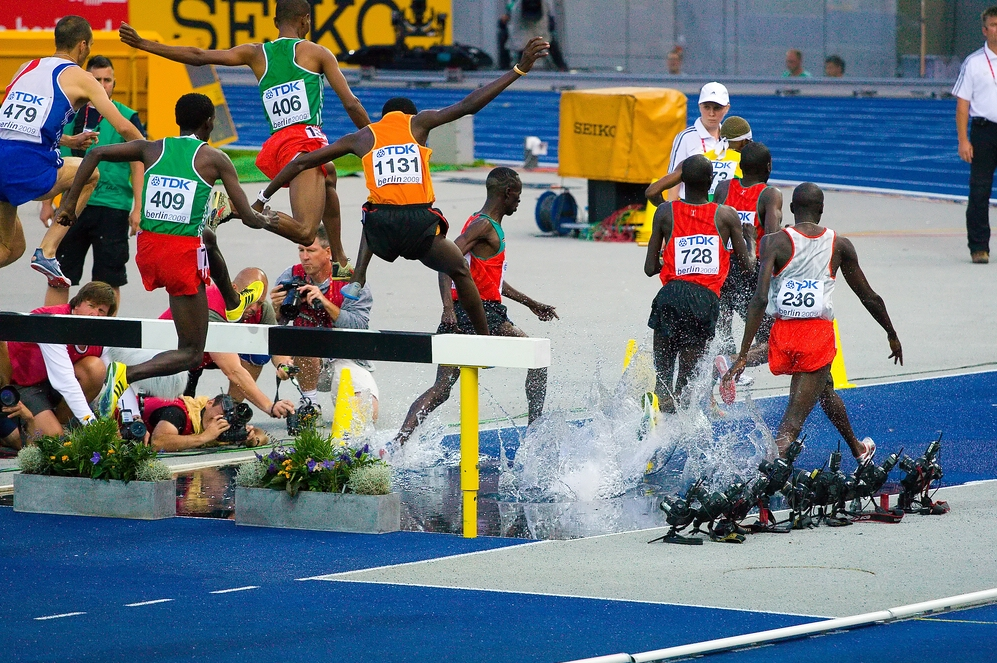
Kenyan athletes led for much of the race

Rank	Name	Nationality	Time	Notes
1st place, gold medalist(s)	Ezekiel Kemboi	Kenya	8:00.43	CR
2nd place, silver medalist(s)	Richard Kipkemboi Mateelong	Kenya	8:00.89	PB
3rd place, bronze medalist(s)	Bouabdellah Tahri	France	8:01.18	AR
4	Paul Kipsiele Koech	Kenya	8:01.26	SB
5	Yacob Jarso	Ethiopia	8:12.13	PB
6	Roba Gary	Ethiopia	8:12.40	
7	Brimin Kiprop Kipruto	Kenya	8:12.61	
8	Jukka Keskisalo	Finland	8:14.47	
9	Eliseo Martín	Spain	8:16.51	SB
10	Tareq Mubarak Taher	Bahrain	8:17.08	
11	Benjamin Kiplagat	Uganda	8:17.82	
12	Abubaker Ali Kamal	Qatar	8:19.72	
13	Ruben Ramolefi	South Africa	8:32.54	
14	Mustafa Mohamed	Sweden	8:35.77	
	Jamel Chatbi	Morocco	DNS	

Key: AR = Area record, CR = Championship record, DNS = Did not start, PB = Personal best, SB = Seasonal best
