= 2003 European Athletics U23 Championships – Men's 3000 metres steeplechase =

The men's 3000 metres steeplechase event at the 2003 European Athletics U23 Championships was held in Bydgoszcz, Poland, at Zawisza Stadion on 17 and 19 July.

== Medalists ==
Gold	Martin Pröll; Austria
Silver	Radosław Popławski; Poland
Bronze	Jukka Keskisalo; Finland

== Results ==
=== Final ===
19 July

Rank	Name	Nationality	Time	Notes
1st place, gold medalist(s)	Martin Pröll	Austria	8:25.86	CR
2nd place, silver medalist(s)	Radosław Popławski	Poland	8:27.95	
3rd place, bronze medalist(s)	Jukka Keskisalo	Finland	8:28.53	
4	Vadym Slobodenyuk	Ukraine	8:29.00	
5	Halil Akkaş	Turkey	8:33.68	
6	Ion Luchianov	Moldova	8:35.12	
7	Raphael Schäfer	Germany	8:35.66	
8	Itai Maggidi	Israel	8:43.92	
9	Christian Klein	Germany	8:45.22	
10	Koen Wilssens	Belgium	8:51.08	
11	Romain Arpin	France	8:55.97	
	Matteo Villani	Italy	DQ	

=== Heats ===
17 July
Qualified: first 4 in each heat and 4 best to the Final

==== Heat 1 ====
Rank	Name	Nationality	Time	Notes
1	Ion Luchianov	Moldova	8:34.68	Q
2	Radosław Popławski	Poland	8:36.07	Q
3	Vadym Slobodenyuk	Ukraine	8:36.13	Q
4	Christian Klein	Germany	8:36.25	Q
5	Koen Wilssens	Belgium	8:38.14	q
6	Romain Arpin	France	8:43.01	q
7	Sergey Berdnik	Belarus	8:45.58	
8	Vitalij Gorlukovič	Lithuania	8:45.60	
9	Mariusz Giżyński	Poland	8:50.99	
10	Erik Emilsson	Sweden	8:51.43	
11	Krijn Van Koolwyk	Belgium	8:59.10	
12	Jermaine Mays	Great Britain	9:03.30	
13	Máté Németh	Hungary	9:04.56	
14	Senaid Hasić	Bosnia and Herzegovina	9:23.09	
	Adil El Oualidi	France	DNF	

==== Heat 2 ====
Rank	Name	Nationality	Time	Notes
1	Martin Pröll	Austria	8:37.53	Q
2	Halil Akkaş	Turkey	8:37.57	Q
3	Jukka Keskisalo	Finland	8:39.39	Q
4	Raphael Schäfer	Germany	8:39.64	Q
5	Itai Maggidi	Israel	8:41.87	q
6	Matteo Villani	Italy	8:44.56	q
7	Pieter Desmet	Belgium	8:45.52	
8	Adam Bowden	Great Britain	8:51.06	
9	Bjørnar Ustad Kristensen	Norway	8:51.93	
10	František Zouhar	Czech Republic	8:54.47	
11	Steffen Preuk	Germany	9:06.92	
12	Mickaël André	France	9:10.50	
13	Mircea Bogdan	Romania	9:21.56	
	Hristoforos Merousis	Greece	DNF	
	Tomasz Szymkowiak	Poland	DNF	

== Participation ==
According to an unofficial count, 30 athletes from 21 countries participated in the event.

- Austria (1)
- Belarus (1)
- Belgium (3)
- Bosnia and Herzegovina (1)
- Czech Republic (1)
- Finland (1)
- France (3)
- Germany (3)
- Great Britain (2)
- Greece (1)
- Hungary (1)
- Israel (1)
- Italy (1)
- Lithuania (1)
- Moldova (1)
- Norway (1)
- Poland (3)
- Romania (1)
- Sweden (1)
- Turkey (1)
- Ukraine (1)
