= Athletics at the 2008 Summer Olympics – Men's 3000 metres steeplechase =

Men's 3000 metres steeplechase at the Games of the XXIX Olympiad
- Venue: Beijing National Stadium
- Dates: August 16 (heats); August 18 (final)
- Competitors: 40 from 27 nations

Medalists
| 1st place, gold medalist(s) | | Brimin Kiprop Kipruto | Kenya |
| 2nd place, silver medalist(s) | | Mahiedine Mekhissi-Benabbad | France |
| 3rd place, bronze medalist(s) | | Richard Kipkemboi Mateelong | Kenya |

The Men's 3000 metres steeplechase at the 2008 Olympic Games took place on 16–18 August at the Beijing Olympic Stadium. The winning margin was 0.15 seconds which as of 2024 remains the only time the men's steeplechase was won by less than 0.3 seconds at the Olympics.

The qualifying standards were 8:24.60 (A standard) and 8:32.00 (B standard).

Brimin Kipruto, who won the silver medal at the 2004 Olympic Games in Athens, became the seventh Kenyan runner in a row to win this event at the Olympics. In total Kenya won nine gold medals in the 3000m steeplechase since 1968, but none of those medalists was ever able to defend his title.

== Records ==
Prior to this competition, the existing world record, Olympic record, and world leading time were as follows:

| World record | (Qatar) Saif Saaeed Shaheen (QAT) | 7:53.63 | Brussels, Belgium | 3 September 2004 |
| Olympic record | Julius Kariuki (KEN) | 8:05.51 | Seoul, South Korea | 30 September 1988 |
| World Leading | Paul Kipsiele Koech (KEN) | 8:00.57 | Heusden-Zolder, Belgium | 20 July 2008 |

No new world or Olympic records were set for this event.

== Results ==
=== Round 1 ===
| Heat | Position | Athlete | Country | Time | Notes |
|---|---|---|---|---|---|
| 1 | 1 | Bouabdellah Tahri | France | 8:23.42 | Q |
| 1 | 2 | Brimin Kiprop Kipruto | Kenya | 8:23.53 | Q |
| 1 | 3 | Abdelkader Hachlaf | Morocco | 8:23.62 | Q |
| 1 | 4 | Tareq Mubarak Taher | Bahrain | 8:23.66 | Q |
| 1 | 5 | Nahom Mesfin | Ethiopia | 8:23.82 | |
| 1 | 6 | Ildar Minshin | Russia | 8:26.85 | |
| 1 | 7 | Tomasz Szymkowiak | Poland | 8:29.37 | |
| 1 | 8 | Rabia Makhloufi | Algeria | 8:29.74 | |
| 1 | 9 | Yoshitaka Iwamizu | Japan | 8:29.80 | |
| 1 | 10 | Valērijs Žolnerovičs | Latvia | 8:37.65 | |
| 1 | 11 | Alberto Paulo | Portugal | 8:39.11 | |
| 1 | 12 | Rubén Palomeque | Spain | 8:58.50 | |
| 1 | | Matteo Villani | Italy | DNF | |
| 2 | 1 | Yacob Jarso | Ethiopia | 8:16.88 | Q, PB |
| 2 | 2 | Mahiedine Mekhissi-Benabbad | France | 8:16.95 | Q, SB |
| 2 | 3 | Anthony Famiglietti | United States | 8:17.34 | Q, PB |
| 2 | 4 | Ezekiel Kemboi | Kenya | 8:17.55 | Q |
| 2 | 5 | Mustafa Mohamed | Sweden | 8:17.80 | q |
| 2 | 6 | Youcef Abdi | Australia | 8:17.97 | q, PB |
| 2 | 7 | Ion Luchianov | Moldova | 8:18.97 | q, NR |
| 2 | 8 | Boštjan Buc | Slovenia | 8:21.24 | |
| 2 | 9 | Brahim Taleb | Morocco | 8:23.09 | |
| 2 | 10 | Andrew Lemoncello | Great Britain | 8:36.06 | |
| 2 | 11 | William Nelson | United States | 8:36.66 | |
| 2 | 12 | José Luis Blanco | Spain | 8:37.37 | |
| 2 | 13 | Ali Ahmed Al-Amri | Saudi Arabia | 9:09.73 | |
| 2 | | Jukka Keskisalo | Finland | DNS | |
| 3 | 1 | Ruben Ramolefi | South Africa | 8:19.86 | Q, PB |
| 3 | 2 | Richard Kipkemboi Mateelong | Kenya | 8:19.87 | Q |
| 3 | 3 | Benjamin Kiplagat | Uganda | 8:20.22 | Q |
| 3 | 4 | Abubaker Ali Kamal | Qatar | 8:21.85 | Q |
| 3 | 5 | Eliseo Martín | Spain | 8:23.19 | SB |
| 3 | 6 | Hamid Ezzine | Morocco | 8:27.45 | |
| 3 | 7 | Vincent Zouaoui Dandrieaux | France | 8:27.91 | |
| 3 | 8 | Roba Gary | Ethiopia | 8:28.27 | |
| 3 | 9 | Joshua McAdams | United States | 8:33.26 | |
| 3 | 10 | Pavel Potapovich | Russia | 8:36.29 | |
| 3 | 11 | Pieter Desmet | Belgium | 8:37.99 | |
| 3 | 12 | Halil Akkaş | Turkey | 8:44.70 | |
| 3 | 13 | Itai Maggidi | Israel | 9:05.02 | |

Legend: Q=Qualified top 4 in heat; q=Qualified by time; DNF=Did not finish; DNS=Did not start; DQ=Disqualified; NR=National record; PB=Personal best; SB=Season best

== Final ==
| Rank | Athlete | Country | Time | Notes |
|---|---|---|---|---|
| 1st place, gold medalist(s) | Brimin Kiprop Kipruto | Kenya | 8:10.34 | SB |
| 2nd place, silver medalist(s) | Mahiedine Mekhissi-Benabbad | France | 8:10.49 | PB |
| 3rd place, bronze medalist(s) | Richard Kipkemboi Mateelong | Kenya | 8:11.01 | |
| 4 | Yacob Jarso | Ethiopia | 8:13.47 | NR |
| 5 | Bouabdellah Tahri | France | 8:14.79 | |
| 6 | Youcef Abdi | Australia | 8:16.36 | PB |
| 7 | Ezekiel Kemboi | Kenya | 8:16.38 | |
| 8 | Abubaker Ali Kamal | Qatar | 8:16.59 | |
| 9 | Benjamin Kiplagat | Uganda | 8:20.27 | |
| 10 | Mustafa Mohamed | Sweden | 8:20.69 | |
| 11 | Tareq Mubarak Taher | Bahrain | 8:21.59 | |
| 12 | Ion Luchianov | Moldova | 8:27.82 | |
| 13 | Anthony Famiglietti | United States | 8:31.21 | |
| 14 | Ruben Ramolefi | South Africa | 8:34.58 | |
| 15 | Abdelkader Hachlaf | Morocco | 9:02.06 | |

=== Splits ===
| Intermediate | Athlete | Country | Mark |
|---|---|---|---|
| 1000m | Ruben Ramolefi | South Africa | 2:46.97 |
| 2000m | Mustafa Mohamed | Sweden | 5:33.84 |
