= 2010 European Athletics Championships – Men's 3000 metres steeplechase =

Men's 3000 metres steeplechase at the European Athletics Championships

The men's 3000 metres steeplechase at the 2010 European Athletics Championships was held at the Estadi Olímpic Lluís Companys on 30 July and 1 August.

Frenchmen Mahiedine Mekhissi-Benabbad and Bouabdellah Tahri took the gold and silver medals, respectively. The initial bronze medallist José Luis Blanco was later stripped of his medal as he had given a positive drugs test at the Spanish championships in July. Ion Luchianov of Moldova was elevated to the bronze medal.

== Medalists ==
Gold	Mahiedine Mekhissi-Benabbad; France (FRA)
Silver	Bouabdellah Tahri; France (FRA)
Bronze	Ion Luchianov; Moldova (MDA)

== Records ==
Standing records prior to the 2010 European Athletics Championships
World record	Saif Saaeed Shaheen (QAT)	7:53.63	Brussels, Belgium	3 September 2004
European record	Bouabdellah Tahri (FRA)	8:01.18	Berlin, Germany	18 August 2009
Championship record	Francesco Panetta (ITA)	8:12.66	Split, Yugoslavia	30 August 1990
World Leading	Brimin Kiprop Kipruto (KEN)	8:00.90	Saint-Denis, France	16 July 2010
European Leading	Bouabdellah Tahri (FRA)	8:03.72	Metz, France	29 June 2010
Broken records during the 2010 European Athletics Championships
Championship record	Mahiedine Mekhissi-Benabbad (FRA)	8:07.87	Barcelona, Spain	1 August 2010

== Schedule ==
Date	Time	Round
30 July 2010	11:40	Round 1
1 August 2010	20:15	Final

== Results ==
=== Round 1 ===
==== Heat 1 ====
Rank	Name	Nationality	Time	Notes
1	Bouabdellah Tahri	France	8:30.11	Q
DQ	Ildar Minshin	Russia	~~8:30.14~~	Q, Doping
DQ	José Luis Blanco	Spain	~~8:30.53~~	Q, Doping
2	Steffen Uliczka	Germany	8:30.61	Q
3	Bjørnar Ustad Kristensen	Norway	8:30.91	q
4	Hubert Pokrop	Poland	8:32.77	
5	Krijn van Koolwyk	Belgium	8:33.00	
6	Ángel Mullera	Spain	8:37.38	
7	Vincent Zouaoui Dandrieux	France	8:38.33	
8	Pedro Ribeiro	Portugal	8:45.18	
9	Joonas Harjamäki	Finland	8:47.25	
10	Pep Sansa Bullich	Andorra	9:24.39	

==== Heat 2 ====
Rank	Name	Nationality	Time	Notes
1	Mahiedine Mekhissi-Benabbad	France	8:27.32	Q
2	Ion Luchianov	Moldova	8:29.49	Q
3	Tomasz Szymkowiak	Poland	8:30.02	Q
4	Alberto Paulo	Portugal	8:30.26	Q
5	Boštjan Buč	Slovenia	8:31.08	q, SB
6	Eliseo Martín	Spain	8:31.71	q
7	Andrey Farnosov	Russia	8:31.88	q
8	Mustafa Mohamed	Sweden	8:32.05	
9	Janne Ukonmaanaho	Finland	8:33.48	PB
10	Martin Pröll	Austria	8:41.63	
11	Mário Teixeira	Portugal	8:42.53	
	Pieter Desmet	Belgium	DNF	

==== Summary ====
Rank	Heat	Name	Nationality	Time	Notes
1	2	Mahiedine Mekhissi-Benabbad	France	8:27.32	Q
2	2	Ion Luchianov	Moldova	8:29.49	Q
3	2	Tomasz Szymkowiak	Poland	8:30.02	Q
4	1	Bouabdellah Tahri	France	8:30.11	Q
DQ	1	Ildar Minshin	Russia	~~8:30.14~~	Q, Doping
5	2	Alberto Paulo	Portugal	8:30.26	Q
DQ	1	José Luis Blanco	Spain	~~8:30.53~~	Q, Doping
6	1	Steffen Uliczka	Germany	8:30.61	Q
7	1	Bjørnar Ustad Kristensen	Norway	8:30.91	q
8	2	Boštjan Buč	Slovenia	8:31.08	q, SB
9	2	Eliseo Martín	Spain	8:31.71	q
10	2	Andrey Farnosov	Russia	8:31.88	q
11	2	Mustafa Mohamed	Sweden	8:32.05	
12	1	Hubert Pokrop	Poland	8:32.77	
13	1	Krijn van Koolwyk	Belgium	8:33.00	
14	2	Janne Ukonmaanaho	Finland	8:33.48	PB
15	1	Ángel Mullera	Spain	8:37.38	
16	1	Vincent Zouaoui Dandrieux	France	8:38.33	
17	2	Martin Pröll	Austria	8:41.63	
18	2	Mário Teixeira	Portugal	8:42.53	
19	1	Pedro Ribeiro	Portugal	8:45.18	
20	1	Joonas Harjamäki	Finland	8:47.25	
21	1	Pep Sansa Bullich	Andorra	9:24.39	
	2	Pieter Desmet	Belgium	DNF	

=== Final ===
Rank	Name	Nationality	Time	Notes
1st place, gold medalist(s)	Mahiedine Mekhissi-Benabbad	France	8:07.87	CR
2nd place, silver medalist(s)	Bouabdellah Tahri	France	8:09.28	
DQ	José Luis Blanco	Spain	~~8:19.15~~	Doping
3rd place, bronze medalist(s)	Ion Luchianov	Moldova	8:19.64	SB
4	Tomasz Szymkowiak	Poland	8:23.37	
DQ	Ildar Minshin	Russia	~~8:24.87~~	Doping
5	Steffen Uliczka	Germany	8:25.39	PB
6	Eliseo Martín	Spain	8:27.49	
7	Bjørnar Ustad Kristensen	Norway	8:27.89	SB
8	Alberto Paulo	Portugal	8:28.08	
9	Andrey Farnosov	Russia	8:37.52	
10	Boštjan Buč	Slovenia	8:48.83	
