= 2005 World Championships in Athletics – Men's 3000 metres steeplechase =

The Men's 3,000 metres Steeplechase event at the 2005 World Championships in Athletics was held on August 7 and August 9 at the Helsinki Olympic Stadium. The first three of each heat (Q) plus the six fastest times (q) qualified for the final.

== Medalists ==
Gold	Saif Saaeed Shaheen; Qatar (QAT)
Silver	Ezekiel Kemboi; Kenya (KEN)
Bronze	Brimin Kipruto; Kenya (KEN)

== Schedule ==
- All times are Eastern European Time (UTC+2)

Qualification Round
Heat 1	Heat 2	Heat 3
07.08.2005 – 13:50h	07.08.2005 – 14:04h	07.08.2005 – 14:18h
Final
09.08.2005 – 21:20h

== Abbreviations ==
- All results shown are in minutes

Q	automatic qualification
q	qualification by rank
DNS	did not start
NM	no mark
WR	world record
AR	area record
NR	national record
PB	personal best
SB	season best

== Startlist ==
№	Heat 1	SB	PB
1029	Steve Slattery (USA)	8:17.87	8:15.69
769	Saif Saaeed Shaheen (QAT)	7:55.51	7:53.63
740	Radosław Popławski (POL)	8:17.87	8:17.32
557	Ezekiel Kemboi (KEN)	8:09.04	8:02.49
887	Mustafa Mohamed (SWE)	8:15.51	8:05.75
849	Boštjan Buc (SLO)	8:22.91	8:16.96
40	Günther Weidlinger (AUT)	8:12.26	8:10.83
757	Alexander Greaux (PUR)	8:38.26	8:27.91
636	Ion Luchianov (MDA)	8:30.66	8:23.83
236	Luis Miguel Martín (ESP)	8:17.47	8:07.44
57	Pieter Desmet (BEL)	8:20.31	8:15.02
331	Gaël Pencreach (FRA)	8:18.18	8:13.16
675	Simon Vroemen (NED)	8:04.95	8:04.95
№	Heat 2	SB	PB
335	Bouabdellah Tahri (FRA)	8:09.58	8:06.91
562	Paul Kipsiele Koech (KEN)	7:56.37	7:56.37
273	Tewodros Shiferaw (ETH)	8:27.06	8:22.22
718	Jakub Czaja (POL)	8:17.49	8:17.49
762	Musa Amer Obaid (QAT)	8:11.75	8:07.18
982	Anthony Famiglietti (USA)	8:19.46	8:17.91
234	Antonio David Jiménez (ESP)	8:14.05	8:11.52
521	Yoshitaka Iwamizu (JPN)	8:22.54	8:18.93
819	Andrey Olshanskiy (RUS)	8:19.68	8:19.68
33	Peter Nowill (AUS)	8:23.93	8:22.85
289	Jukka Keskisalo (FIN)	8:25.14	8:16.74
115	Tareq Mubarak Taher (BHR)	8:16.26	8:07.12
627	Hamid Ezzine (MAR)	8:21.38	8:09.72
№	Heat 3	SB	PB
792	Ruben Ramolefi (RSA)	8:20.40	8:20.18
359	Andrew Lemoncello (GBR)	8:30.12	8:23.74
330	Vincent Le Dauphin (FRA)	8:17.32	8:15.76
65	Krijn van Koolwijk (BEL)	8:17.11	8:17.11
220	José Luis Blanco (ESP)	8:21.04	8:12.86
835	Roman Usov (RUS)	8:26.96	8:22.29
1004	Daniel Lincoln (USA)	8:12.65	8:08.82
136	Matthew Kerr (CAN)	8:20.14	8:20.14
770	Moustafa Ahmed Shebto (QAT)	8:33.00	8:18.52
561	Brimin Kiprop Kipruto (KEN)	8:04.22	8:02.89
622	Brahim Boulami (MAR)	8:04.92	7:55.28
929	Halil Akkaş (TUR)	8:22.00	8:18.43
38	Martin Pröll (AUT)	8:13.74	8:13.74
948	Vadym Slobodenyuk (UKR)	8:28.85	8:19.50

== Results ==
=== Heat 1 ===
1. Saif Saaeed Shaheen, Qatar 8:11.79 Q
2. Ezekiel Kemboi, Kenya 8:11.90 Q
3. Simon Vroemen, Netherlands 8:13.08 Q (SB)
4. Günther Weidlinger, Austria 8:15.91 q
5. Luis Miguel Martín, Spain 8:17.47 q
6. Mustafa Mohamed, Sweden 8:18.18 q
7. Gaël Pencreach, France 8:23.96
8. Radosław Popławski, Poland 8:29.85
9. Ion Luchianov, Moldova 8:32.09 (SB)
10. Steve Slattery, United States 8:36.01
11. Alexander Greaux, Puerto Rico 8:39.91
12. Boštjan Buc, Slovenia 8:40.81
13. Pieter Desmet, Belgium 8:48.05

=== Heat 2 ===
1. Paul Kipsiele Koech, Kenya 8:16.42 Q
2. Musa Amer Obaid, Qatar 8:16.53 Q
3. Antonio David Jiménez, Spain 8:16.72 Q
4. Bouabdellah Tahri, France 8:18.31 q
5. Tareq Mubarak Taher, Bahrain 8:21.68 q
6. Anthony Famiglietti, United States 8:21.84
7. Jukka Keskisalo, Finland 8:25.14 (SB)
8. Tewodros Shiferaw, Ethiopia 8:27.06 (SB)
9. Hamid Ezzine, Morocco 8:27.07
10. Yoshitaka Iwamizu, Japan 8:28.73
11. Peter Nowill, Australia 8:35.35
12. Andrey Olshanskiy, Russia 8:54.04
- Jakub Czaja, Poland DNF

=== Heat 3 ===
1. Brahim Boulami, Morocco 8:19.54 Q
2. Brimin Kipruto, Kenya 8:19.90 Q
3. José Luis Blanco, Spain 8:21.04 Q (SB)
4. Daniel Lincoln, United States 8:21.39 q
5. Halil Akkaş, Turkey 8:26.35
6. Ruben Ramolefi, South Africa 8:28.12
7. Krijn van Koolwijk, Belgium 8:28.92
8. Vincent Le Dauphin, France 8:30.42
9. Moustafa Ahmed Shebto, Qatar 8:33.00 (SB)
10. Martin Pröll, Austria 8:33.70
11. Vadym Slobodenyuk, Ukraine 8:35.73
12. Roman Usov, Russia 8:36.30
13. Andrew Lemoncello, Great Britain 8:40.29
14. Matthew Kerr, Canada 8:41.20

=== Final ===
1. Saif Saaeed Shaheen, Qatar 8:13.31
2. Ezekiel Kemboi, Kenya 8:14.95
3. Brimin Kipruto, Kenya 8:15.30
4. Brahim Boulami, Morocco 8:15.32
5. Simon Vroemen, Netherlands 8:16.76
6. Antonio David Jiménez, Spain 8:17.69
7. Paul Kipsiele Koech, Kenya 8:19.14
8. Bouabdellah Tahri, France 8:19.96
9. Musa Amer Obaid, Qatar 8:20.22
10. Mustafa Mohamed, Sweden 8:20.26
11. Luis Miguel Martín, Spain 8:22.13
12. Günther Weidlinger, Austria 8:22.84
13. Daniel Lincoln, United States 8:23.89
14. José Luis Blanco, Spain 8:24.62
15. Tareq Mubarak Taher, Bahrain 8:37.62
