= 2005 European Athletics U23 Championships – Men's 3000 metres steeplechase =

The men's 3000 metres steeplechase event at the 2005 European Athletics U23 Championships was held in Erfurt, Germany, at Steigerwaldstadion on 14 and 16 July.

== Medalists ==
Gold	Radosław Popławski; Poland
Silver	Halil Akkaş; Turkey
Bronze	Pieter Desmet; Belgium

== Results ==
=== Final ===
16 July

Rank	Name	Nationality	Time	Notes
1st place, gold medalist(s)	Radosław Popławski	Poland	8:32.61	
2nd place, silver medalist(s)	Halil Akkaş	Turkey	8:37.38	
3rd place, bronze medalist(s)	Pieter Desmet	Belgium	8:41.07	
4	Mark Buckingham	United Kingdom	8:41.26	
5	Anatoliy Harkovets	Ukraine	8:42.91	
6	Luke Gunn	United Kingdom	8:43.79	
7	Tomasz Szymkowiak	Poland	8:48.25	
8	Norbert Löwa	Germany	8:49.77	
9	Christian Klein	Germany	8:50.63	
10	Valērijs Žolnerovičs	Latvia	8:52.34	
11	Łukasz Parszczyński	Poland	8:54.55	
12	Abdelhakim Zilali	France	9:07.00	

=== Heats ===
14 July
Qualified: first 4 in each heat and 4 best to the Final

==== Heat 1 ====
Rank	Name	Nationality	Time	Notes
1	Mark Buckingham	United Kingdom	8:43.20	Q
2	Halil Akkaş	Turkey	8:43.36	Q
3	Christian Klein	Germany	8:44.13	Q
4	Pieter Desmet	Belgium	8:46.27	Q
5	Tomasz Szymkowiak	Poland	8:48.57	q
6	Mahiedine Mekhissi-Benabbad	France	8:49.95	
7	Cene Šubic	Slovenia	8:54.02	
8	Vitalij Gorlukovič	Lithuania	8:54.81	
9	Marcos Peón	Spain	8:55.01	
10	Mickaël Fadeau	France	8:56.70	

==== Heat 2 ====
Rank	Name	Nationality	Time	Notes
1	Radosław Popławski	Poland	8:41.77	Q
2	Anatoliy Harkovets	Ukraine	8:43.34	Q
3	Łukasz Parszczyński	Poland	8:43.50	Q
4	Luke Gunn	United Kingdom	8:43.56	Q
5	Valērijs Žolnerovičs	Latvia	8:44.80	q
6	Norbert Löwa	Germany	8:45.64	q
7	Abdelhakim Zilali	France	8:47.99	q
8	Steffen Uliczka	Germany	8:58.37	
9	Enrique Sánchez	Spain	9:00.68	
10	Dries Busselot	Belgium	9:10.80	
11	Balázs Ott	Hungary	9:20.76	

== Participation ==
According to an unofficial count, 21 athletes from 12 countries participated in the event.

- Belgium (2)
- France (3)
- Germany (3)
- Hungary (1)
- Latvia (1)
- Lithuania (1)
- Poland (3)
- Slovenia (1)
- Spain (2)
- Turkey (1)
- Ukraine (1)
- United Kingdom (2)
