= Athletics at the 2012 Summer Olympics – Men's 3000 metres steeplechase =

Men's 3000 metres steeplechase at the Games of the XXX Olympiad
- Venue: Olympic Stadium
- Date: 3–5 August
- Competitors: 39 from 27 nations
- Winning time: 8:18.56

Medalists
1st place, gold medalist(s)		Ezekiel Kemboi	Kenya
2nd place, silver medalist(s)		Mahiedine Mekhissi-Benabbad	France
3rd place, bronze medalist(s)		Abel Mutai	Kenya

Official Video

The Men's 3000 metres steeplechase competition at the 2012 Summer Olympics in London, United Kingdom. The event was held at the Olympic Stadium on 3–5 August.

The steeplechase has become a national event of Kenya. Their team tactics dominate major championship races. For the first 5 laps, they let others dominate the lead, primarily led by Americans Donald Cabral and Evan Jager. Then the Kenyans decided to move as a team, leaving the field to chase. With less than 800 metres to go, Ugandan Benjamin Kiplagat got tangled up on a barrier and fell flat on his face, the runners behind him having to scramble. 200 metres later, Kenyan Brimin Kipruto fell. Though he quickly scrambled to his feet, that effectively ruined the chances for a Kenyan sweep. Still the other two led through the final lap. Former gold medalist and multiple world champion Ezekiel Kemboi pulled away off the front. As Abel Mutai began to falter, Mahiedine Mekhissi-Benabbad sprinted past to repeat his silver medal. Kemboi's lead was secure and after clearing the final barrier, he began to celebrate, drifting out to lane 8 by the time he crossed the finish line.

After the finish, Kemboi did the victory dance he has become known for. He and Mekhissi-Benabbad exchanged jerseys and the diminutive Kemboi leaped into the much larger Mekhissi-Benabbad's arms.

== Competition format ==
The Men's 3000 m steeplechase competition consists of heats (Round 1) and a Final.

== Schedule ==
All times are British Summer Time (UTC+1)

Date	Time	Round
Friday, 3 August 2012	13:00	Round 1
Sunday, 5 August 2012	21:25	Finals

== Records ==
Prior to the competition, the existing World and Olympic records were as follows.

World record	Saif Saaeed Shaheen (QAT)	7:53.63	Brussels, Belgium	3 September 2004
Olympic record	Julius Kariuki (KEN)	8:05.51	Seoul, South Korea	30 September 1988
2012 World leading	Paul Kipsiele Koech (KEN)	7:54.31	Rome, Italy	31 May 2012

The following National records were set during this competition.

Turkey National Record	Tarik Langat Akdag (TUR)	8:17.85 s
Venezuela National Record	José Peña (VEN)	8:24.06 s

== Results ==
Official Video of First Round

=== Round 1 ===
Qual. rule: first 4 of each heat (Q) plus the 3 fastest times (q) qualified.

==== Heat 1 ====
Rank	Athlete	Nationality	Time	Notes
1	Mahiedine Mekhissi-Benabbad	France	8:16.23	Q
2	Evan Jager	United States	8:16.61	Q
3	Abel Mutai	Kenya	8:17.70	Q
4	Tarik Langat Akdag	Turkey	8:17.85	Q, NR
5	Nahom Mesfin Tariku	Ethiopia	8:18.16	q, SB
6	Benjamin Kiplagat	Uganda	8:18.44	q
7	Amor Ben Yahia	Tunisia	8:22.70	PB
8	José Peña	Venezuela	8:24.06	NR
9	Ali Ahmed Al-Amri	Saudi Arabia	8:26.22	SB
10	Hicham Sigueni	Morocco	8:35.89	
11	Angel Mullera	Spain	8:38.07	
12	Alberto Paulo	Portugal	8:40.74	
13	Steffen Uliczka	Germany	8:41.08	

==== Heat 2 ====
Rank	Athlete	Nationality	Time	Notes
1	Brimin Kipruto	Kenya	8:28.62	Q
2	Yuri Floriani	Italy	8:29.01	Q
3	Brahim Taleb	Morocco	8:29.02	Q
4	Jukka Keskisalo	Finland	8:29.13	Q
5	Nikolay Chavkin	Russia	8:29.72	
6	Youcef Abdi	Australia	8:29.81	
7	Jacob Araptany	Uganda	8:35.85	
8	Vincent Zouaoui-Dandrieux	France	8:36.96	
9	Kyle Alcorn	United States	8:37.11	
10	Artem Kosinov	Kazakhstan	8:42.27	
11	Mario Bazan	Peru	8:51.95	
12	Abdelaziz Merzougui	Spain	8:58.20	
-	Birhan Getahun	Ethiopia	DNF	

==== Heat 3 ====
Rank	Athlete	Nationality	Time	Notes
1	Roba Gari	Ethiopia	8:20.68	Q
2	Ezekiel Kemboi	Kenya	8:20.97	Q
3	Hamid Ezzine	Morocco	8:21.25	Q
4	Donald Cabral	United States	8:21.46	Q
5	Ion Luchianov	Moldova	8:22.09	q, SB
6	Mohamed Khaled Belabbas	Algeria	8:22.32	SB
7	Alex Genest	Canada	8:22.62	SB
8	Vadym Slobodenyuk	Ukraine	8:23.35	
9	Łukasz Parszczyński	Poland	8:30.08	
10	Weynay Ghebresilasie	Eritrea	8:37.57	
11	Albert Minczér	Hungary	8:40.74	SB
12	Stuart Stokes	Great Britain	8:43.04	
-	Víctor Garcia	Spain	DNF	

=== Final ===
Rank	Athlete	Nationality	Time	Notes
1st place, gold medalist(s)	Ezekiel Kemboi	Kenya	8:18.56	
2nd place, silver medalist(s)	Mahiedine Mekhissi-Benabbad	France	8:19.08	
3rd place, bronze medalist(s)	Abel Mutai	Kenya	8:19.73	
4	Roba Gari	Ethiopia	8:20.00	
5	Brimin Kipruto	Kenya	8:23.03	
6	Evan Jager	United States	8:23.87	
7	Hamid Ezzine	Morocco	8:24.90	
8	Donald Cabral	United States	8:25.91	
9	Tarik Langat Akdag	Turkey	8:27.64	
10	Ion Luchianov	Moldova	8:28.15	
11	Brahim Taleb	Morocco	8:32.40	
12	Nahom Mesfin Tariku	Ethiopia	8:35.12	
13	Yuri Floriani	Italy	8:40.07	
	Jukka Keskisalo	Finland	DNF	
	Benjamin Kiplagat	Uganda	DQ	R 163.3b*

* Infringement of the inside border.
