= 2002 World Junior Championships in Athletics – Men's 3000 metres steeplechase =

The men's 3000 metres steeplechase event at the 2002 World Junior Championships in Athletics was held in Kingston, Jamaica, at National Stadium on 18 and 20 July.

== Medalists ==
Gold	Mike Kipyego; Kenya
Silver	David Kirwa; Kenya
Bronze	Abubaker Kamal; Qatar

== Results ==
=== Final ===
20 July

Rank	Name	Nationality	Time	Notes
1st place, gold medalist(s)	Mike Kipyego	Kenya	8:29.54	
2nd place, silver medalist(s)	David Kirwa	Kenya	8:31.44	
3rd place, bronze medalist(s)	Abubaker Kamal	Qatar	8:33.67	
4	Radosław Popławski	Poland	8:37.87	
5	Fernando Fernandes	Brazil	8:45.76	
6	Halil Akkaş	Turkey	8:50.17	
7	Shuji Yoshioka	Japan	8:52.30	
8	Mohamed Ali Al-Banai	Saudi Arabia	8:52.38	
9	Robbie Nissen	Canada	8:53.69	
10	Arkangelo Roko	Sudan	8:54.81	
11	Vitaliy Gorlukovic	Lithuania	9:01.11	
12	Stephen Murphy	United Kingdom	9:05.80	

=== Heats ===
18 July

==== Heat 1 ====
Rank	Name	Nationality	Time	Notes
1	David Kirwa	Kenya	8:50.17	Q
2	Radosław Popławski	Poland	8:51.40	Q
3	Robbie Nissen	Canada	8:52.05	Q
4	Shuji Yoshioka	Japan	8:52.56	Q
5	Mohamed Ali Al-Banai	Saudi Arabia	8:56.69	q
6	Vitaliy Gorlukovic	Lithuania	8:57.23	q
7	Ruben Schwarz	Germany	9:01.58	
8	Miloš Vujkovic	Yugoslavia	9:04.26	
9	Michael Fadeau	France	9:05.29	
10	Mandla Maseko	South Africa	9:05.60	
11	Atef Zaamouchi	Algeria	9:09.07	
12	Cristian Patiño	Ecuador	9:09.72	
13	Michael Shelley	Australia	9:11.18	
14	Gehad Abdelhaleem	Egypt	9:36.71	

==== Heat 2 ====
Rank	Name	Nationality	Time	Notes
1	Mike Kipyego	Kenya	8:44.31	Q
2	Abubaker Kamal	Qatar	8:46.69	Q
3	Fernando Fernandes	Brazil	8:47.96	Q
4	Halil Akkaş	Turkey	8:55.05	Q
5	Stephen Murphy	United Kingdom	8:56.85	q
6	Arkangelo Roko	Sudan	8:57.99	q
7	Larbi Hamidi	Algeria	9:02.10	
8	Piet Desmet	Belgium	9:05.17	
9	Luke Taylor	Australia	9:14.37	
10	Anthony Godongwana	South Africa	9:15.59	
11	Christian Klein	Germany	9:25.85	
12	Kristjan Hunter	Canada	9:30.97	
13	Marco Carbonetti	Italy	9:37.72	
14	Enrique Sánchez	Spain	9:45.35	
	Sergei Tserepannikov	Estonia	DNF	

== Participation ==
According to an unofficial count, 29 athletes from 23 countries participated in the event.

- Algeria (2)
- Australia (2)
- Belgium (1)
- Brazil (1)
- Canada (2)
- Ecuador (1)
- Egypt (1)
- Estonia (1)
- France (1)
- Germany (2)
- Italy (1)
- Japan (1)
- Kenya (2)
- Lithuania (1)
- Poland (1)
- Qatar (1)
- Saudi Arabia (1)
- South Africa (2)
- Spain (1)
- Sudan (1)
- Turkey (1)
- United Kingdom (1)
- Yugoslavia (1)
