= 2007 European Athletics Indoor Championships – Men's 3000 metres =

The Men's 3000 metres event at the 2007 European Athletics Indoor Championships was held on March 2–3.

== Medalists ==
Gold	Silver	Bronze
Cosimo Caliandro; Italy	Bouabdellah Tahri; France	Jesús España; Spain

== Results ==
=== Heats ===
First 4 of each heat (Q) and the next 4 fastest (q) qualified for the final.

Rank	Heat	Name	Nationality	Time	Notes
1	1	Jesús España	Spain	7:52.50	Q
2	1	Günther Weidlinger	Austria	7:53.04	Q
3	1	Alistair Cragg	Ireland	7:53.18	Q
4	1	Sergey Ivanov	Russia	7:53.30	Q, SB
5	1	Arne Gabius	Germany	7:53.98	q
6	2	Halil Akkas	Turkey	7:54.72	Q
7	2	Cosimo Caliandro	Italy	7:54.82	Q
8	2	Bouabdellah Tahri	France	7:55.04	Q
9	2	Aleksey Yefimov	Russia	7:55.09	Q, PB
10	1	Mo Farah	Great Britain	7:55.36	q
11	1	Itai Maggidi	Israel	7:55.42	q, NR
12	2	Erik Sjöqvist	Sweden	7:55.96	q
13	1	Henrik Skoog	Sweden	7:56.93	
14	2	Alberto García	Spain	8:02.00	
15	1	Iaroslav Muşinschi	Moldova	8:04.28	PB
16	2	Marius Ionescu	Romania	8:06.02	PB
17	2	Scott Overall	Great Britain	8:06.88	
18	1	Bjørnar Ustad Kristensen	Norway	8:07.76	
19	2	Martin Steinbauer	Austria	8:09.32	
20	2	Mark Carroll	Ireland	8:12.60	
21	2	Kári Steinn Karlsson	Iceland	8:31.91	
22	2	Mark Christie	Ireland	8:33.61	
23	1	Mircea Bogdan	Romania	8:33.82	
	1	José Antonio Redolat	Spain	DNF	
	2	Boštjan Buč	Slovenia	DNF	

=== Final ===
Rank	Name	Nationality	Time	Notes
1st place, gold medalist(s)	Cosimo Caliandro	Italy	8:02.44	
2nd place, silver medalist(s)	Bouabdellah Tahri	France	8:02.85	
3rd place, bronze medalist(s)	Jesús España	Spain	8:02.91	
4	Halil Akkas	Turkey	8:03.14	
5	Mo Farah	Great Britain	8:03.50	
6	Alistair Cragg	Ireland	8:03.70	
7	Günther Weidlinger	Austria	8:04.19	
8	Erik Sjöqvist	Sweden	8:07.44	
9	Arne Gabius	Germany	8:08.51	
10	Aleksey Yefimov	Russia	8:09.88	
11	Sergey Ivanov	Russia	8:11.91	
12	Itai Maggidi	Israel	8:15.82	
