= 2003 World Championships in Athletics – Men's 3000 metres steeplechase =

These are the official results of the Men's 3000 metres steeplechase event at the 2003 IAAF World Championships in Paris, France. There were a total number of 36 participating athletes, with three qualifying heats and the final held on Tuesday 2003-08-26 at 21:30h.

== Analysis ==
In Kenya, where the steeplechase is virtually the national sport and source of national pride, the top up and coming athletes in 2003 were Stephen Cherono and Ezekiel Kemboi. Along with Stephen's brother Abraham Cherono, they swept the 2002 Commonwealth Games Steeplechase for Kenya. In 2003, there was a huge change.

Qatar was near the beginning of their program to purchase mercenary athletes; young, promising athletes who would take Qatari citizenship and (unique to Qatar's program) take on a different name. Stephen, and some 40 other athletes, took the deal. Changing his name from Stephen Cherono to Saif Saaeed Shaheen, he was reported to have received up to US$1 million to become a Qatari citizen, although he denied this. This was the first major competition where, as Shaheen, he was wearing a different country's bib. This angered his former teammates who were determined to beat him.

Over the previous two decades, Kenyan athletes have learned how to use team tactics to essentially gang up on the rest of the world while assuring another Kenyan victory. Shaheen had learned these tactics. Now virtually alone, he had to figure out how to beat them. He chose to run away from them. Alone out front, no team could get in his way. He did have a teammate in the race, a veteran former Sudanese athlete who had been running for Qatar for several years, Khamis Abdullah Saifeldin. Beaten off the start line by three Kenyans, Saifeldin literally elbowed his way to the already forming Kenyan blockade at the front. Sidestepping into the next lane he sprinted past them followed by Shaheen who was with the lead Kenyans waiting for his arrival. Saifeldin was first over the first barrier with Shaheen in tow and a gap already forming. The only athlete to bridge the gap was Shaheen's brother, Abraham Cherono. The first lap was just over 60 seconds, 4 minute mile pace. 2:04 by the second lap (now slightly shorter laps through the water jump). 1000 metres into the race and Saifeldin was exhausted and started to drop back. Shaheen accelerated around him. 3:06 for three laps. Soon Abraham started to fall back, Shaheen was alone. With the pack disappearing behind them, Shaheen was cranking out laps at sub-world record pace. By the fourth lap at 4:12 he had opened up a 20 metre lead, but on the fifth lap, he was beginning to show signs of fatigue.

His closest pursuer, Kemboi rapidly began gaining on Shaheen. With a thousand metres to go, Kemboi was frustrated with his slow gains against Shaneen's huge lead and suddenly sprinted to both catch Shaheen then to keep on running past him, creating a 7 metre gap of his own. This time Shaheen did not go away, making back the gap to mark Kemboi. Two barriers later, Shaheen sprinted into the lead and Kemboi sprinted back to the front. With all the spurts and retreats, the lead pace had slowed while the peloton had steadily made up the lost ground. Led by Luis Miguel Martín and Eliseo Martín, the pack had moved back into contention, with the French home crowd excited that Bouabdellah Tahri was in the mix with a lap to go. But the two prizefighters at the front didn't notice, they were still throwing their best punches at each other.

At the bell, Kemboi again sprinted to open up a slight gap. After the fourth barrier, Shaheen sprinted past, opening up a gap over the third barrier and into the water jump. This move at the fourth barrier would later become Kemboi's trademark. Also, unlike later years, Kemboi took the water jump carefully by pushing off the barrier. Coming out of the pit, Kemboi positioned himself for one final sprint, passing Shaheen over the final barrier on the outside. With a slight gap, Kemboi looked to be sprinting to victory, but Shaheen surged again taking the lead thirty metres out. Defeated, the exhausted Kemboi jogged across the line and lay down on the track.

While bronze medalist Eliseo Martín, enthusiastically came to congratulate Shaheen, the Kenyans did not congratulate their former teammate, now traitor, on his victory. Even his own brother walked off the track in disgust.

Without Shaheen in the race, Kemboi would claim Olympic gold the following year. A couple of weeks later, Shahen would one up him again by setting what was the world record in the event. Shaheen would repeat as champion in 2005, again over Kemboi, but would then disappear from the scene after suffering chronic knee and ankle injuries. After three straight silver medals, Kemboi would finally take gold in 2009, beginning a legendary winning streak of four straight gold medals and seven straight gold or silver medals through 2015 and another Olympic gold in 2012. Each of those victories was marked with a celebration victory dance and the same sprint between the fourth and third remaining barriers that he learned from Shaheen in this race.

== Final ==
RANK	FINAL	TIME
	Saif Saaeed Shaheen (QAT)	8:04.39
	Ezekiel Kemboi (KEN)	8:05.11
	Eliseo Martín (ESP)	8:09.09
4.	Bouabdellah Tahri (FRA)	8:10.65
5.	Abraham Cherono (KEN)	8:13.37
6.	Luis Miguel Martín (ESP)	8:13.52
7.	Simon Vroemen (NED)	8:13.71
8.	José Luis Blanco (ESP)	8:17.16
9.	Jukka Keskisalo (FIN)	8:17.72
10.	Ali Ezzine (MAR)	8:19.15
11.	Yoshitaka Iwamizu (JPN)	8:19.29
12.	Khamis Abdullah Saifeldin (QAT)	8:28.37
13.	Abdelkader Hachlaf (MAR)	8:35.17
—	Reuben Kosgei (KEN)	DNF
—	Luleseged Wale (ETH)	DNS

== Heats ==
Held on Saturday 2003-08-23

RANK	HEAT 1	TIME
1.	Ezekiel Kemboi (KEN)	8:18.09
2.	Simon Vroemen (NED)	8:18.24
3.	José Luis Blanco (ESP)	8:18.76
4.	Yoshitaka Iwamizu (JPN)	8:18.93
5.	Khamis Abdullah Saifeldin (QAT)	8:19.64
6.	Ali Ezzine (MAR)	8:20.10
7.	Luleseged Wale (ETH)	8:21.30
8.	Peter Nowill (AUS)	8:26.22
9.	Michael Kipyego (KEN)	8:27.45
10.	Daniel Lincoln (USA)	8:32.47
11.	Vincent Le Dauphin (FRA)	8:36.42
12.	Matthew Kerr (CAN)	8:57.62

RANK	HEAT 2	TIME
1.	Saif Saaeed Shaheen (QAT)	8:22.20
2.	Jukka Keskisalo (FIN)	8:22.41
3.	Eliseo Martín (ESP)	8:22.54
4.	Abraham Cherono (KEN)	8:22.67
5.	Boštjan Buc (SLO)	8:22.89
6.	Zouhair Ouerdi (MAR)	8:23.75
7.	Abdelhakim Maazouz (ALG)	8:24.60
8.	Martin Pröll (AUT)	8:25.84
9.	Mustafa Mohamed (SWE)	8:25.99
10.	Lotfi Turki (TUN)	8:28.95
11.	Angelo Iannelli (ITA)	8:36.08
12.	Robert Gary (USA)	8:38.20

RANK	HEAT 3	TIME
1.	Luis Miguel Martín (ESP)	8:19.09
2.	Bouabdellah Tahri (FRA)	8:19.44
3.	Abdelkader Hachlaf (MAR)	8:19.49
4.	Reuben Kosgei (KEN)	8:20.63
5.	Steve Slattery (USA)	8:22.32
6.	Tewodros Shiferaw (ETH)	8:23.41
7.	Radosław Popławski (POL)	8:24.34
8.	Vadym Slobodenyuk (UKR)	8:28.64
9.	Filmon Ghirmai (GER)	8:28.89
10.	Pavel Potapovich (RUS)	8:38.63
11.	Alexandra Motone (RSA)	9:05.45
—	Günther Weidlinger (AUT)	DNF

== See also ==
- Athletics at the 2003 Pan American Games - Men's 3000 metres steeplechase
