= Itai Maggidi =

Israeli long-distance runner

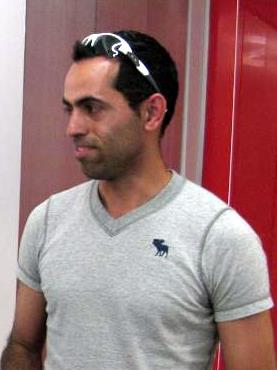
- Itai Maggidi

Personal information
- Native name: איתי מגידי
- Citizenship: Israel
- Born: January 9, 1981 (age 45)

Sport
- Sport: Track
- Event: long-distance runner who specializes in the 3000 metres steeplechase
- Updated on 27 March 2015

Itai Maggidi (Hebrew: איתי מגידי; born 9 January 1981) is an Israeli long-distance runner who specializes in the 3000 metres steeplechase.

== Biography ==
Itai Maggidi is Jewish. He attended Clemson University.

== Sports career ==
Itai Maggidi finished 6th at the 2000 World Junior Championships, 11th at the 2006 European Championships and 12th (in the 3000 metres) at the 2007 European Indoor Championships. He also competed at the 2007 World Championships and competed on behalf of Israel at the 2008 Summer Olympics in Beijing, China, in the 2008 Olympic Games 3000 metre steeplechase without reaching the final.

His personal best time is 8:24.14 minutes, achieved in July 2008 in Longeville-lès-Metz. This is the Israeli record. He also has 3:41.73 minutes in the 1500 metres, achieved in August 2003 in Heusden-Zolder; 7:55.42 minutes in the 3000 metres (indoor), achieved at the 2007 European Indoor Championships in Birmingham; and 29:29.34 minutes in the 10,000 metres, achieved in March 2006 in Palo Alto.

== Competition record ==
Year	Competition	Venue	Position	Event	Notes
Representing Israel
2000	World Junior Championships	Santiago, Chile	6th	3000m steeplechase	8:51.26
2003	European U23 Championships	Bydgoszcz, Poland	8th	3000m steeplechase	8:43.92
2006	European Championships	Gothenburg, Sweden	11th	3000 m steeple	8:43.75
2007	European Indoor Championships	Birmingham, United Kingdom	12th	3000 m	8:15.82
2007	Universiade	Bangkok, Thailand	11th	3000 m s'chase	8:50.31
2007	World Championships	Osaka, Japan	30th (h)	3000 m s'chase	8:43.00
2008	Olympic Games	Beijing, China	37th (h)	3000 m s'chase	9:05.02
2012	European Championships	Helsinki, Finland	19th (h)	3000 m steeple	8:47.29

== See also ==
- List of Israeli records in athletics
- Sports in Israel
