= Łukasz Parszczyński =

Polish runner (born 1985)

Personal information
- Nationality: Poland
- Born: 4 May 1985 (age 41) Warsaw, Poland
- Height: 1.80 m (5 ft 11 in)
- Weight: 66 kg (146 lb) (2012)

Sport
- Sport: Athletics
- Event: Middle distance running
- Club: Podlasie Białystok

Łukasz Parszczyński (born 4 May 1985 in Warsaw) is a Polish runner. He competed in the 3000 m steeplechase event at the 2012 Summer Olympics.

== Competition record ==
Year	Competition	Venue	Position	Event	Notes
Representing Poland
2004	World Cross Country Championships	Brussels, Belgium	44th	Junior race (8 km)	26:44
2004	World Junior Championships	Grosseto, Italy	14th (h)	1500 m	3:47.08
2005	European U23 Championships	Erfurt, Germany	11th	3000m steeplechase	8:54.55
2006	European Cross Country Championships	San Giorgio su Legnano, Italy	21st	U23 race (8.03 km)	23:50
2006	European Cross Country Championships	San Giorgio su Legnano, Italy	3rd	U23 race - Team	94 pts
2007	European U23 Championships	Debrecen, Hungary	7th (h)^{†}	3000m steeplechase	8:37.93^{†}
2007	European Cross Country Championships	Toro, Spain	8th	U23 race (8.2 km)	24:26
2007	European Cross Country Championships	Toro, Spain	2nd	U23 race - Team	52 pts
2009	European Indoor Championships	Turin, Italy	14th (h)	1500 m	3:44.27
2011	European Indoor Championships	Paris, France	14th (h)	3000 m	8:03.14
2011	World Championships	Daegu, South Korea	31st (h)	3000 m s'chase	8:44.09
2012	European Championships	Helsinki, Finland	5th	3000 m s'chase	8:38.76
2012	Olympic Games	London, United Kingdom	24th (h)	3000 m s'chase	8:30.08
2014	World Indoor Championships	Sopot, Poland	16th (h)	3000 m	7:52.91
2015	European Indoor Championships	Prague, Czech Republic	7th	3000 m	7:50.11

^{†}: Disqualified in the final.
