= Eliseo Martín =

Aragonese Spanish long-distance runner

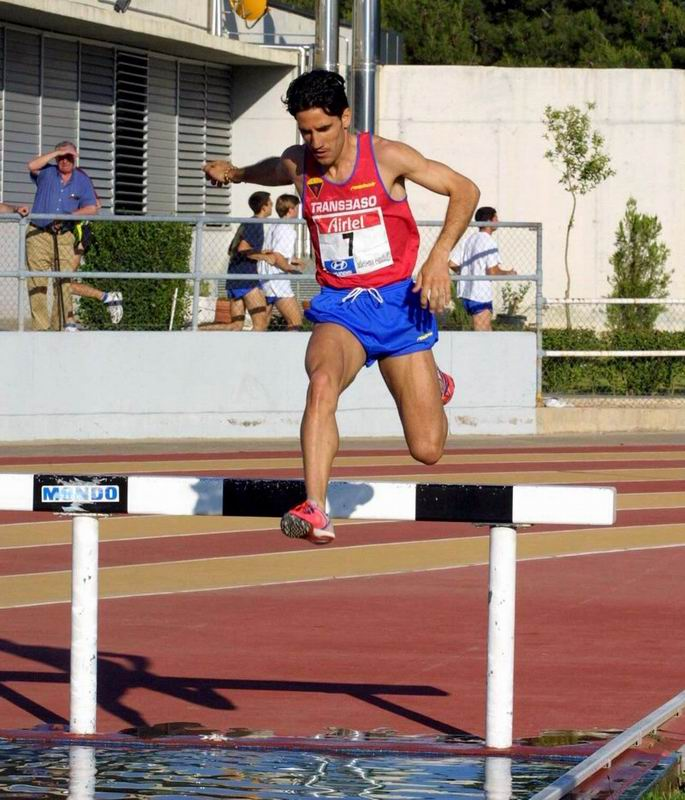

Medal record

Men's athletics

Representing Spain

World Championships
Bronze medal – third place	2003 Paris	3000 m steeplechase

Eliseo Martín Omenat (born 5 November 1973 in Monzón) is an Aragonese Spanish long-distance runner who specializes in 3000 metres steeplechase. His biggest success was the bronze medal at the 2003 World Championships in Paris.

== Competition record ==
Year	Competition	Venue	Position	Event	Notes
Representing Spain
1992	World Junior Championships	Seoul, South Korea	7th	10,000 m	29:38.13
1997	Mediterranean Games	Bari, Italy	6th	3000 m st.	8:37.95
1998	European Championships	Budapest, Hungary	7th	3000 m st.	8:26.60
1999	World Championships	Seville, Spain	6th	3000 m st.	8:16.09
2000	Olympic Games	Sydney, Australia	6th	3000 m st.	8:23:00
2001	World Championships	Edmonton, Canada	12th	3000 m st.	8:27.78
2002	European Championships	Munich, Germany	5th	3000 m st.	8:28.63
2003	World Championships	Paris, France	3rd	3000 m st.	8:09.09 PB
2003	World Athletics Final	Monte Carlo, Monaco	6th	3000 m st.	8:16.38
2004	Olympic Games	Athens, Greece	9th	3000 m st.	8:15.77
2007	World Championships	Osaka, Japan	7th	3000 m st.	8:22.91
2008	Olympic Games	Beijing, China	14th (h)	3000 m st.	8:23.19
2009	World Championships	Berlin, Germany	9th	3000 m st.	8:16.51
2010	European Championships	Barcelona, Spain	7th	3000 m st	8:27.49

=== Personal bests ===
- 1500 metres - 3:40.96 min (2000)
- 3000 metres - 7:50.71 min (2003)
- 5000 metres - 13:47.77 min (2001)
- 10,000 metres - 28:39.11 min (1999)
- 3000 metres steeplechase - 8:09.09 min (2003)
