= Martin Pröll =

Austrian track and field athlete (born 1981)

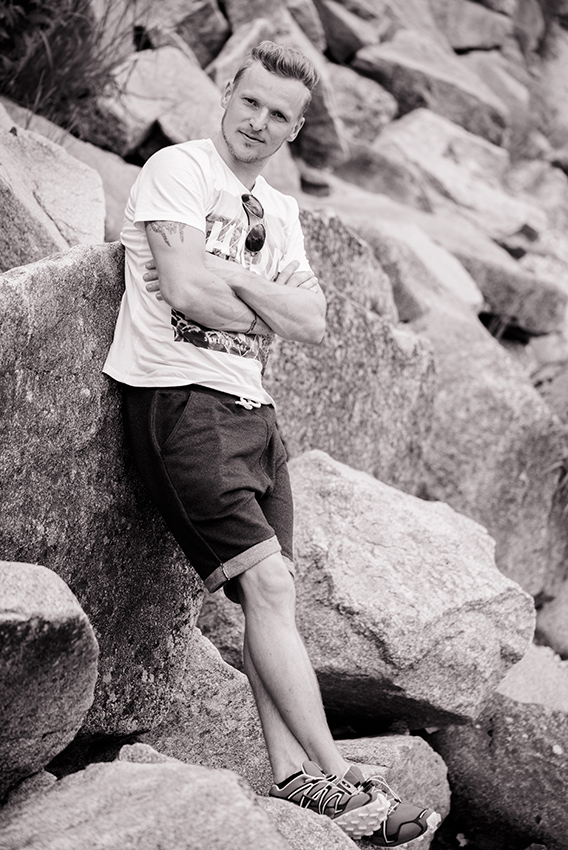
Martin Pröll

Martin Pröll (born 21 March 1981, in Freistadt) is an Austrian track and field athlete who mainly competes in the 3000 metres steeplechase.

== Achievements ==
Year	Competition	Venue	Position	Event	Notes
Representing Austria
2000	World Junior Championships	Santiago, Chile	5th	3000m steeplechase	8:46.80
2001	European U23 Championships	Amsterdam, Netherlands	5th	3000m steeplechase	8:39.85
2002	European Championships	Munich, Germany	7th	3000 m steeplechase	8:33.24
2003	European U23 Championships	Bydgoszcz, Poland	1st	3000 m steeplechase	8:25.86
2003	World Championships	Paris, France	22nd (h)	3000 m steeplechase	8:25.84
2004	Summer Olympics	Athens, Greece	19th (h)	3000 m steeplechase	8:26.01
2005	European Indoor Championships	Madrid, Spain	8th	3000 m	7:57.37
2005	World Championships	Helsinki, Finland	29th (h)	3000 m steeplechase	8:33.70
2006	European Championships	Gothenburg, Sweden	9th	3000 m steeplechase	8:35.69
2009	European Indoor Championships	Turin, Italy	10th	3000 m	8:04.03
2010	European Championships	Barcelona, Spain	19th (h)	3000 m steeplechase	8:41.63
