= Tomasz Szymkowiak =

Polish track and field athlete (born 1983)

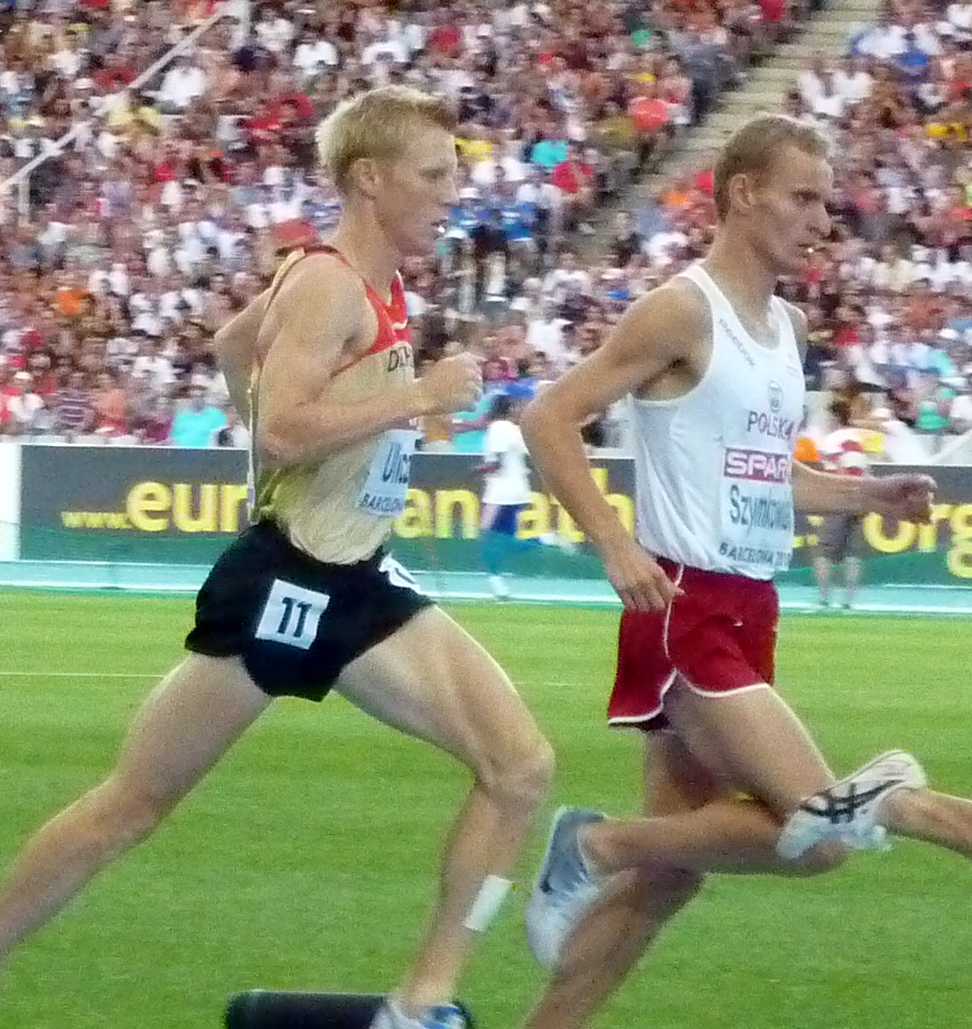
Tomasz Szymkowiak (right) in 2010

Tomasz Szymkowiak (born 5 July 1983 in Września) is a Polish track and field athlete who mainly competes in the 3000 metres steeplechase.

== Achievements ==
Year	Competition	Venue	Position	Event	Notes
Representing Poland
2003	European U23 Championships	Bydgoszcz, Poland	—	3000m steeplechase	DNF
2005	European U23 Championships	Erfurt, Germany	7th	3000m steeplechase	8:48.25
2006	European Championships	Gothenburg, Sweden	18th (h)	3000 m steeplechase	8:37.00
2007	Universiade	Bangkok, Thailand	6th	3000 m steeplechase	8:37.87
2008	Olympic Games	Beijing, China	24th (h)	3000 m steeplechase	8:29.37
2009	World Championships	Berlin, Germany	19th (h)	3000 m steeplechase	8:27.93
2010	European Team Championships	Bergen, Norway	1st	3000 m steeplechase	8:31.53
2010	European Championships	Barcelona, Spain	5th	3000 m steeplechase	8:23.37
