= Michael Kipyego =

Kenyan long-distance runner

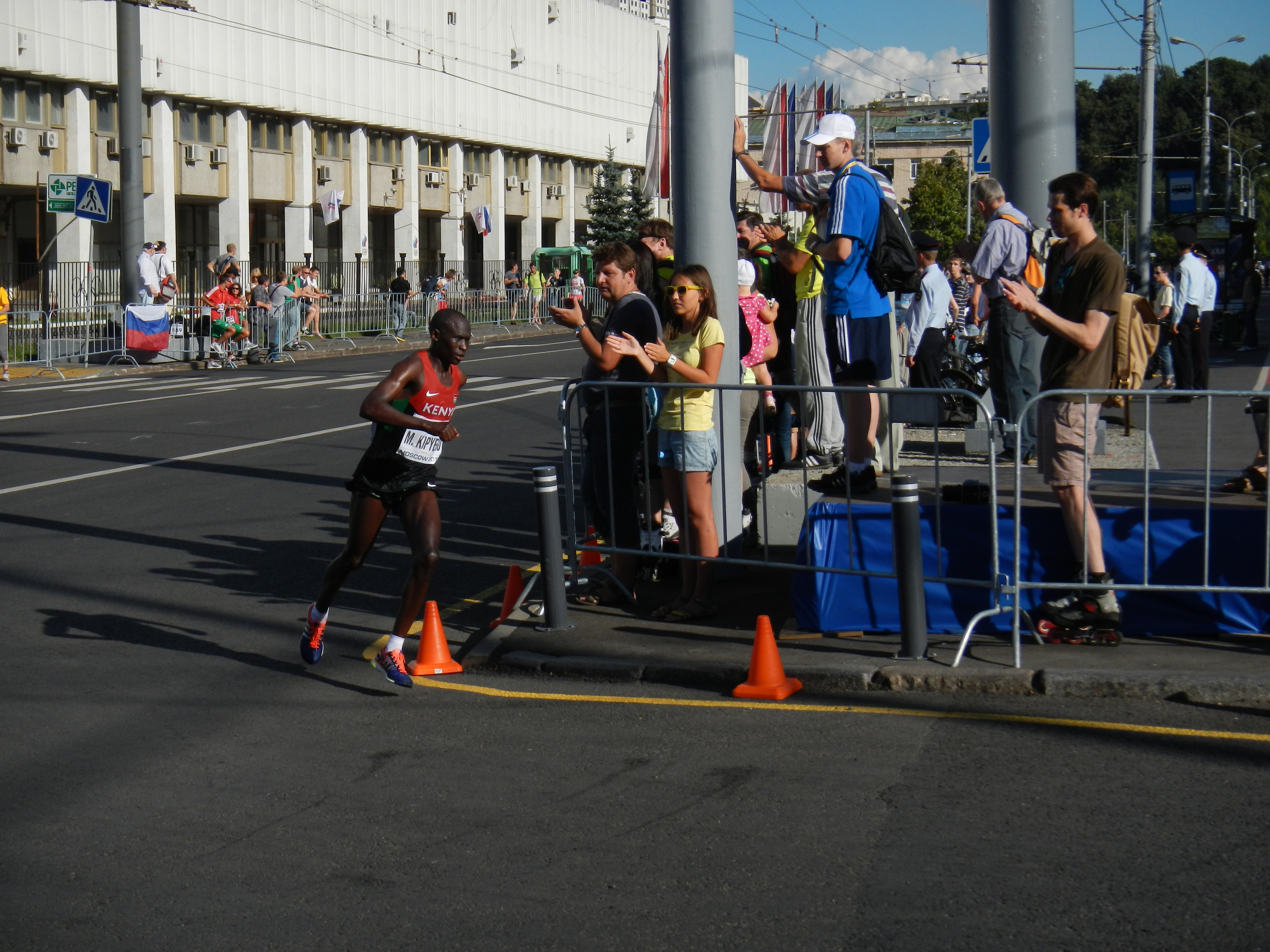

Medal record

Men's athletics

Representing Kenya

African Championships
Silver medal – second place	2008 Addis Ababa	3000 m st.

World Junior Championships
Gold medal – first place	2002 Kingston	3000 m st.

World Cross Country Championships
Gold medal – first place	2003 Lausanne	Team short race
Gold medal – first place	2007 Mombasa	Team long race

Michael Kipkorir Kipyego (born 2 October 1983) is a Kenyan runner who competes in marathon races. He was initially a specialist in the 3000 metres steeplechase and was the 2002 World Junior Champion in the event. He represented Kenya in the steeplechase at the World Championships in 2003 and was runner-up at the 2008 African Championships. He set a personal best of 8:08.48 in 2009.

He won two team titles with Kenya at the IAAF World Cross Country Championships – in the short race 2003 and the long race in 2007. Kipyego switched to road running in 2011 and ran a personal best of 2:06:48 hours for third at the Eindhoven Marathon. He won the Tokyo Marathon title in 2012.

== Career ==
=== Steeplechaser ===
Born in Kemeloi in Kenya's Marakwet District, Kipyego was drawn to distance running by his older brother, Christopher Kipyego, who was a marathon runner. (Their younger sibling, Sally Kipyego, would also become a professional runner.) He began competing in the 3000 metres steeplechase as a teenager, choosing the same specialist event as locally born world champion Moses Kiptanui. His first international selection for Kenya was the 1999 World Youth Championships in Athletics, where he came eighth in the 3000 metres flat. He joined Colm O'Connell's St. Patrick's school in Iten in 2000 and success followed shortly after: he was the silver medallist in the steeplechase at the 2001 African Junior Athletics Championships behind Ezekiel Kemboi.

His breakthrough year came in 2002. After a good debut on grass at the 2002 IAAF World Cross Country Championships, where he was twelfth in the junior category, he had his first major victory at the World Junior Championships, winning the gold medal in the steeplechase. He moved up to senior level the year after and a fourth-place finish in the short race at the 2003 IAAF World Cross Country Championships saw him help Kenya to the team title. He then went on to make the Kenyan team in the steeplechase, although he fell in the heats at the 2003 World Championships in Athletics and was eliminated in the first stage. He did not perform well in 2004, missing spots on the Kenyan teams and suffering from a tendon injury. He set a personal best of 8:10.66 minutes at the 2005 Golden Gala meeting and was third in the Kenyan trials, but was dropped from the international squad in favour of the in-form Paul Kipsiele Koech.

Kipyego's only major competition appearance of 2006 came at the 2006 IAAF World Athletics Final and he narrowly finished out of the medals in fourth place. He gained selection for the long race at the 2007 IAAF World Cross Country Championships and won his second career team title through his sixth-place finish. He finished second to Richard Mateelong at both the national trials and the African Championships (his first podium finish in the event as a senior). He dipped under 8:10 minutes at the Weltklasse Zurich meeting later that year, recording 8:09.05 minutes (making him the fifth fastest man that year) and taking third behind Koech and Mahiedine Mekhissi-Benabbad. He ran at the 2008 IAAF World Athletics Final in Stuttgart, but managed only eighth place. In 2009 he did not gain an international spot for Kenya, but had some success on the European circuit, improving his personal best to 8:08.48 minutes in a runner-up performance at the Herculis meeting and taking seventh at the 2009 IAAF World Athletics Final.

=== Road running ===
Kipyego ran in the steeplechase at the 2010 Doha Athletic Super Grand Prix, but this proved to be one of his last outings in the event as he switched to focus his efforts on road running competitions instead. He made his debut over the marathon distance at the 2011 Rotterdam Marathon and in spite of keeping up with the leaders early on he faded to sixth place with a time of 2:11:03 hours. He ran the half marathon for the first time in September and completed the distance in 1:02:08 hours, taking eighth at the Lille Half Marathon. His second marathon of the year demonstrated his talent for the event as he knocked off four minutes of his best time to take third place at the Eindhoven Marathon with a time of 2:06:48 hours. He won his first race the following year at the Tokyo Marathon, where he surged ahead of Haile Gebrselassie in the late stages to win after 2:07:37 hours. His only other outing that year was the 2012 Chicago Marathon, where he was out of the running with a time of 2:10:02 for thirteenth place.

He attempted a defence of his Tokyo title, but finished behind Dennis Kimetto, although his time of 2:06:58 hours as runner-up was close to a personal best.

== International competitions ==
Year	Competition	Venue	Position	Event	Notes
Representing Kenya
2002	World Junior Championships	Kingston, Jamaica	1st	3000 m s'chase	8:29.54
2003	World Cross Country Championships	Lausanne, Switzerland	4th	Short race (4.03 km)	11:18
2003	World Cross Country Championships	Lausanne, Switzerland	1st	Team	14 pts
2003	World Championships	Paris, France	25th (h)	3000 m s'chase	8:27.45
2006	World Athletics Final	Stuttgart, Germany	4th	3000 m s'chase	8:14.99
2007	World Cross Country Championships	Mombasa, Kenya	6th	Long race (12 km)	37:04
2007	World Cross Country Championships	Mombasa, Kenya	1st	Team	29 pts
2008	African Championships	Addis Ababa, Ethiopia	2nd	3000 m s'chase	8:32.94
2008	World Athletics Final	Stuttgart, Germany	8th	3000 m s'chase	8:24.77
2009	World Athletics Final	Thessaloniki, Greece	7th	3000 m s'chase	8:17.46

== Personal bests ==
- 1500 metres – 3:39.93 min (2005)
- 3000 metres – 7:50.03 min (2009)
- 3000 metres steeplechase – 8:08.48 min (2009)
- Half marathon – 1:02:08 hrs (2011)
- Marathon – 2:06:48 hrs (2011)
