= Vadym Slobodenyuk =

Ukrainian steeplechase runner

Vadym Slobodenyuk (Ukrainian: Вадим Слободенюк; born 17 March 1981 in Rivne) is a Ukrainian runner. He competed in the 3000 m steeplechase event at the 2004 and 2012 Summer Olympics.

== Competition record ==
Year	Competition	Venue	Position	Event	Notes
Representing Ukraine
1999	European Junior Championships	Riga, Latvia	2nd	3000 m steeplechase	8:44.48
2000	World Junior Championships	Santiago, Chile	18th (h)	3000 m steeplechase	9:12.45
2001	European U23 Championships	Amsterdam, Netherlands	2nd	3000 m steeplechase	8:37.09
2002	European Championships	Munich, Germany	6th	3000 m steeplechase	8:30.16
2003	European U23 Championships	Bydgoszcz, Poland	4th	3000 m steeplechase	8:29.00
2003	World Championships	Paris, France	26th (h)	3000 m steeplechase	8:28.64
2004	Olympic Games	Athens, Greece	18th (h)	3000 m steeplechase	8:24.84
2005	World Championships	Helsinki, Finland	31st (h)	3000 m steeplechase	8:35.73
2005	Universiade	İzmir, Turkey	6th	3000 m steeplechase	8:34.41
2006	European Championships	Gothenburg, Sweden	21st (h)	3000 m steeplechase	8:42.55
2007	Universiade	Bangkok, Thailand	13th (h)	3000 m steeplechase	8:46.02
2012	Olympic Games	London, United Kingdom	15th (h)	3000 m steeplechase	8:23.35
2013	World Championships	Moscow, Russia	27th (h)	3000 m steeplechase	8:33.60
2014	European Championships	Zurich, Switzerland	21st (h)	3000 m steeplechase	8:43.99
2016	European Championships	Amsterdam, Netherlands	–	3000 m steeplechase	DNF
