= Athletics at the 2004 Summer Olympics – Men's 3000 metres steeplechase =

Men's 3000 metres steeplechase at the Games of the XXVIII Olympiad
- Olympic Athletics
- Venue: Athens Olympic Stadium
- Dates: 21–24 August
- Competitors: 41 from 27 nations
- Winning time: 8:05.81

Medalists
1st place, gold medalist(s)		Ezekiel Kemboi	Kenya
2nd place, silver medalist(s)		Brimin Kipruto	Kenya
3rd place, bronze medalist(s)		Paul Kipsiele Koech	Kenya

The men's 3000 metres steeplechase at the 2004 Summer Olympics as part of the athletics program were held at the Athens Olympic Stadium from August 21 to 24. The athletes competed in a three-heat qualifying round in which the top three from each heat, together with the six fastest losing runners, were given a place in the final race. The winning margin was 0.30 seconds.

The Kenyan dominance in this event had become well notable. In the final, the Kenyan trio of Brimin Kipruto, Paul Kipsiele Koech, and 2003 World silver medalist Ezekiel Kemboi had established themselves into the lead, supporting each other throughout the race, and running the pace with their own strategy and tactics that could not be matched by any other athlete. On the other hand, Qatar's (Kenyan born) Musa Amer Obaid trailed the Kenyans to keep in contact and follow their every move. At the bell, the Kenyans were able to stay at the front. Spaniard Luis Miguel Martín joined them and tried to launch his sprint to chase the leaders, but he quickly fell behind as the race began to accelerate. Koech took the lead for the Kenyans and opened up a gap through the water jump, before Kemboi moved decisively to pass him and came down the home straight smoothly to victory. Kemboi turned to wave on his teammates Kipruto and Koech, as they cleared the final barrier and sprinted away jubilantly to give the Kenyans a sweep of the medal podium for the first time since the 1992 Barcelona Olympics.

== Records ==
Prior to the competition, the existing World record, Olympic record, and world leading time were as follows:

World record	Brahim Boulami (MAR)	7:55.28	Brussels, Belgium	24 August 2001
Olympic record	Julius Kariuki (KEN)	8:05.52	Seoul, South Korea	30 September 1988
World Leading	Paul Kipsiele Koech (KEN)	7:59.65	Rome, Italy	2 July 2004

No new records were set during the competition.

== Qualification ==
The qualification period for athletics was 1 January 2003 to 9 August 2004. For the men's 3000 metres steeplechase, each National Olympic Committee was permitted to enter up to three athletes that had run the race in 8:24.60 or faster during the qualification period. If an NOC had no athletes that qualified under that standard, one athlete that had run the race in 8:32.00 or faster could be entered.

== Schedule ==
All times are Greece Standard Time (UTC+2)

Date	Time	Round
Saturday, 21 August 2004	22:05	Round 1
Tuesday, 24 August 2004	21:40	Final

== Results ==
=== Round 1 ===
Qualification rule: The first three finishers in each heat (Q) plus the next six fastest overall runners (q) advanced to the final.

==== Heat 1 ====
Rank	Name	Nationality	Result	Notes
1	Khamis Abdullah Saifeldin	Qatar	8:17.89	Q, SB
2	Ezekiel Kemboi	Kenya	8:18.20	Q
3	Bouabdellah Tahri	France	8:18.98	Q
4	Daniel Lincoln	United States	8:19.62	q
5	Ali Ezzine	Morocco	8:20.18	q
6	Eliseo Martín	Spain	8:21.88	q
7	Radosław Popławski	Poland	8:22.16	q, SB
8	Martin Pröll	Austria	8:26.01	
9	Ion Luchianov	Moldova	8:26.17	NR
10	Boštjan Buč	Slovenia	8:37.29	
11	Pavel Potapovich	Russia	8:52.65	
	Giuseppe Maffei	Italy	DNF	
	Roberto Mandje	Equatorial Guinea	DNS	
	Lotfi Turki	Tunisia	DNS	

==== Heat 2 ====
Rank	Name	Nationality	Result	Notes
1	Brimin Kipruto	Kenya	8:15.11	Q
2	Simon Vroemen	Netherlands	8:15.28	Q, SB
3	Luis Miguel Martín	Spain	8:16.90	Q
4	Mustafa Mohamed	Sweden	8:19.37	q
5	Vincent Le Dauphin	France	8:20.13	q
6	Jan Zakrzewski	Poland	8:23.72	
7	Roman Usov	Russia	8:24.19	
8	Vadym Slobodenyuk	Ukraine	8:24.84	PB
9	Abdelatif Chemlal	Morocco	8:29.36	
10	Tewodros Shiferaw	Ethiopia	8:33.15	
11	Abdelhakim Maazouz	Algeria	8:36.12	
12	Robert Gary	United States	8:38.01	
13	Ruben Ramolefi	South Africa	8:46.17	
14	Bashar Omar	Kuwait	8:48.65	NR

==== Heat 3 ====
Rank	Name	Nationality	Result	Notes
1	Musa Amer Obaid	Qatar	8:23.94	Q
2	Antonio David Jiménez	Spain	8:24.13	Q
3	Paul Kipsiele Koech	Kenya	8:24.68	Q
4	Zouhair El-Ouardi	Morocco	8:27.55	
5	Justin Chaston	Great Britain	8:28.35	
6	Yoshitaka Iwamizu	Japan	8:29.07	
7	Peter Nowill	Australia	8:29.14	
8	Anthony Famiglietti	United States	8:31.59	
9	Alexander Greaux	Puerto Rico	8:33.62	
10	Jim Svenøy	Norway	8:33.97	
11	Manuel Silva	Portugal	8:38.31	
12	Luleseged Wale	Ethiopia	8:50.73	
13	Jakub Czaja	Poland	8:56.24	

=== Final ===
Rank	Name	Nationality	Result	Notes
1st place, gold medalist(s)	Ezekiel Kemboi	Kenya	8:05.81	SB
2nd place, silver medalist(s)	Brimin Kipruto	Kenya	8:06.11	
3rd place, bronze medalist(s)	Paul Kipsiele Koech	Kenya	8:06.64	
4	Musa Amer Obaid	Qatar	8:07.18	PB
5	Luis Miguel Martín	Spain	8:11.64	SB
6	Simon Vroemen	Netherlands	8:13.25	SB
7	Bouabdellah Tahri	France	8:14.26	SB
8	Ali Ezzine	Morocco	8:15.58	
9	Eliseo Martín	Spain	8:15.77	SB
10	Vincent Le Dauphin	France	8:16.15	SB
11	Daniel Lincoln	United States	8:16.86	
12	Radosław Popławski	Poland	8:17.32	PB
13	Mustafa Mohamed	Sweden	8:18.05	PB
14	Antonio David Jiménez	Spain	8:22.63	
15	Khamis Abdullah Saifeldin	Qatar	8:36.66	
