= Radosław Popławski =

Polish steeplechase runner (born 1983)

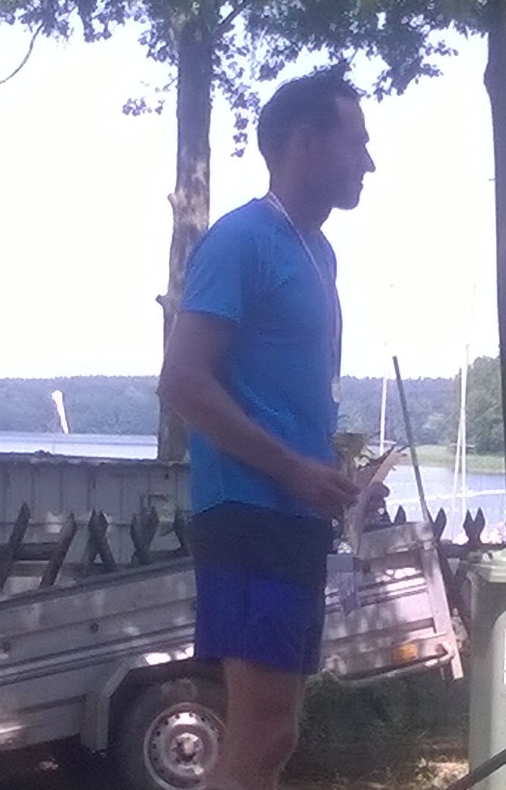

Sport
- Sport: Steeplechase
Medal record
Men's athletics
Representing Poland
European Athletics U23 Championships
Gold medal – first place	2005 Erfurt	3000 m steeplechase

Radosław Popławski (born 16 January 1983) is a Polish steeplechase runner.

He finished 6th in the 3000m steeplechase final at the 2006 European Athletics Championships in Gothenburg. He was also a finalist in the same event 2004 Olympics, where he set his personal best to finish 12th.

== Competition record ==
Year	Competition	Venue	Position	Event	Notes
Representing Poland
1999	World Youth Championships	Bydgoszcz, Poland	21st	3000 m	8:54.40
2001	European Junior Championships	Grosseto, Italy	1st	3000 m s'chase	8:46.36
2002	World Junior Championships	Kingston, Jamaica	4th	3000 m s'chase	8:37.87
2003	European U23 Championships	Bydgoszcz, Poland	2nd	3000 m s'chase	8:27.95
2003	World Championships	Paris, France	20th (h)	3000 m s'chase	8:24.34
2004	Olympic Games	Athens, Greece	12th	3000 m s'chase	8:17.32
2005	European U23 Championships	Erfurt, Germany	1st	3000 m s'chase	8:32.61
2005	World Championships	Helsinki, Finland	24th (h)	3000 m s'chase	8:29.85
2006	European Championships	Gothenburg, Sweden	6th	3000 m s'chase	8:29.33
