= Luke Gunn =

British male track and field athlete (born 1985)

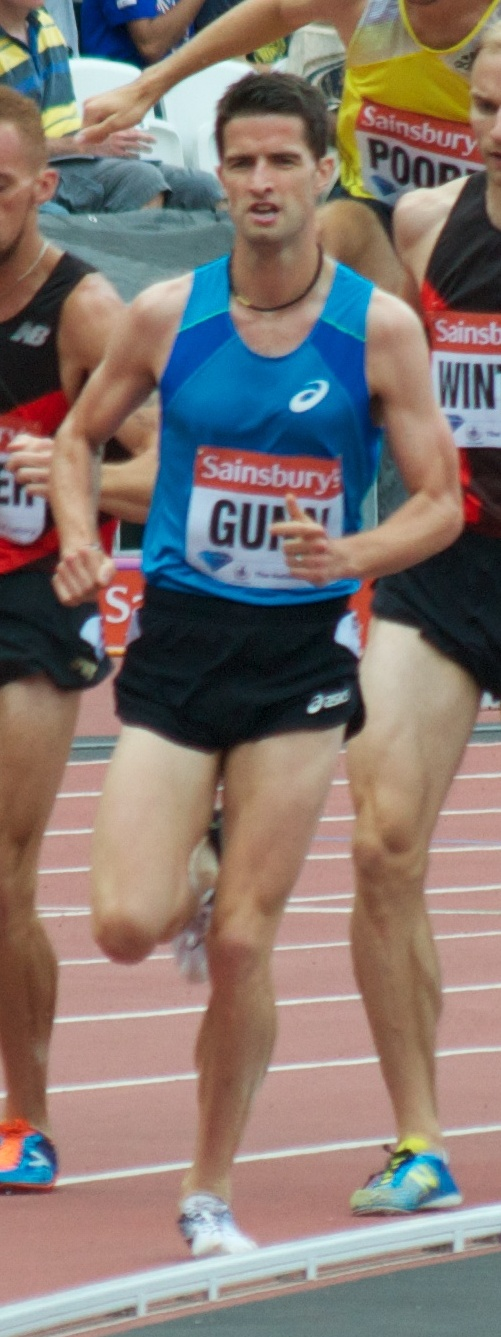
- Gunn in 2013

Personal information
- Nationality: British (English)
- Born: 22 March 1985 (age 41) Derby, Derbyshire, England

Sport
- Sport: Athletics
- Event: Steeplechase
- Club: Derby AC

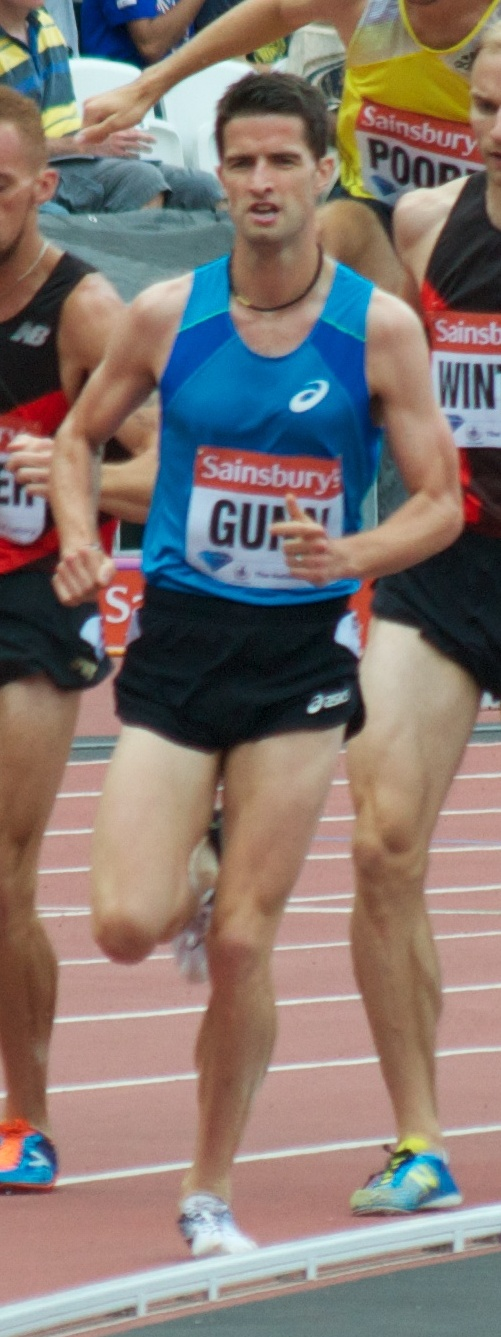
Luke Gunn, 2013, during the IAAF Diamond League event in London.

Luke Simon Gunn (born 22 March 1985) is a British male track and field athlete who competed in the 3000 metres steeplechase.

== Biography ==
Born in Derby, Derbyshire, England, Gunn studied Sport and Material Science at Birmingham University, graduating in 2006.

Gunn also competed for the Florida State Seminoles track and field team in the NCAA.

Gunn was AAA National Champion for Steeplechase in 2009. He was United Kingdom 3000 m Steeplechase Champion between 2009 and 2012. Gunn was placed 4th in the Men's 3000 metres steeplechase at the 2005 Summer Universiade.

Luke Gunn was placed 5th in the 3000 metres steeplechase at the 2014 European Team Championships Super League. Gunn was 5th in the 3000 metres steeplechase at the 2010 European Team Championships Super League. Gunn was placed 6th in the Men's 3000 metres steeplechase at the 2007 European Athletics U23 Championships. Gunn finished 6th in the Men's 3000 metres steeplechase at the 2005 European Athletics U23 Championships. Gunn was 7th in the Junior men individual 5.64km at the 2004 European Cross Country Championships.

Gunn represented England at the Commonwealth Games in 2006, 2010 and 2014. Gunn came 12th in the Men's 3000 metres steeplechase at the 2006 Commonwealth Games. Gunn was placed 7th in the Men's 3000 metres steeplechase at the 2010 Commonwealth Games. Gunn was 7th in the Men's 3000 metres steeplechase at the 2014 Commonwealth Games.

Luke Gunn finished 72nd in the Senior men's race at the 2011 IAAF World Cross Country Championships. He used to represent ASICS but towards the end of his career moved to the Copper Fox.

He married fellow athlete Hannah England in 2013.
