= Bjørnar Ustad Kristensen =

Norwegian track and field athlete (born 1982)

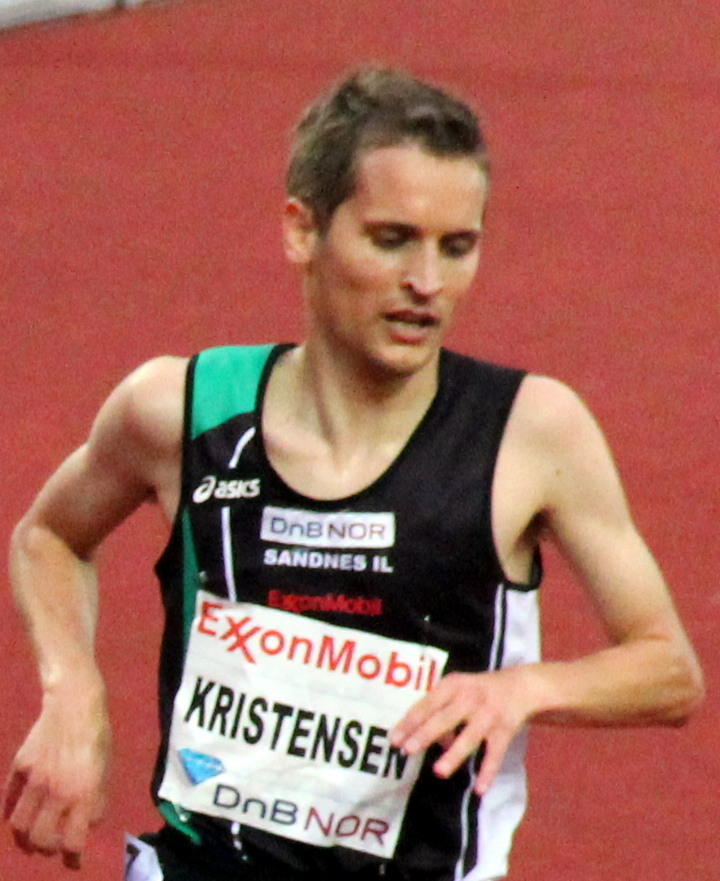
Bjørnar Ustad Kristensen (2011)

Bjørnar Ustad Kristensen (born 26 January 1982 in Stavanger) is a Norwegian track and field athlete who mainly competes in the 3000 metres steeplechase. He represented the club Sandnes IL.

== International competitions ==
Year	Competition	Venue	Position	Event	Notes
Representing Norway
2001	European Junior Championships	Grosseto, Italy	10th	3000 m s'chase	9:02.53
2003	European U23 Championships	Bydgoszcz, Poland	19th (h)	3000 m s'chase	8:51.93
2006	World Indoor Championships	Moscow, Russia	23rd (h)	3000 m	8:21.90
2006	European Championships	Gothenburg, Sweden	23rd (sf)	3000 m s'chase	8:53.93
2007	European Indoor Championships	Birmingham, United Kingdom	18th (h)	3000 m	8:07.76
2007	World Championships	Osaka, Japan	24th (sf)	3000 m s'chase	8:34.84
2009	World Championships	Berlin, Germany	20th (h)	3000 m s'chase	8:28.49
2010	European Championships	Barcelona, Spain	8th	3000 m s'chase	8:27.89
2011	European Indoor Championships	Paris, France	21st (h)	3000 m	8:11.63
2011	World Championships	Daegu, South Korea	29th (h)	3000 m s'chase	8:39.85
2016	European Championships	Amsterdam, Netherlands	20th (h)	3000 m s'chase	8:54.73
