= José Luis Blanco =

Spanish middle-distance runner

Jose Luis Blanco Quevedo OLY
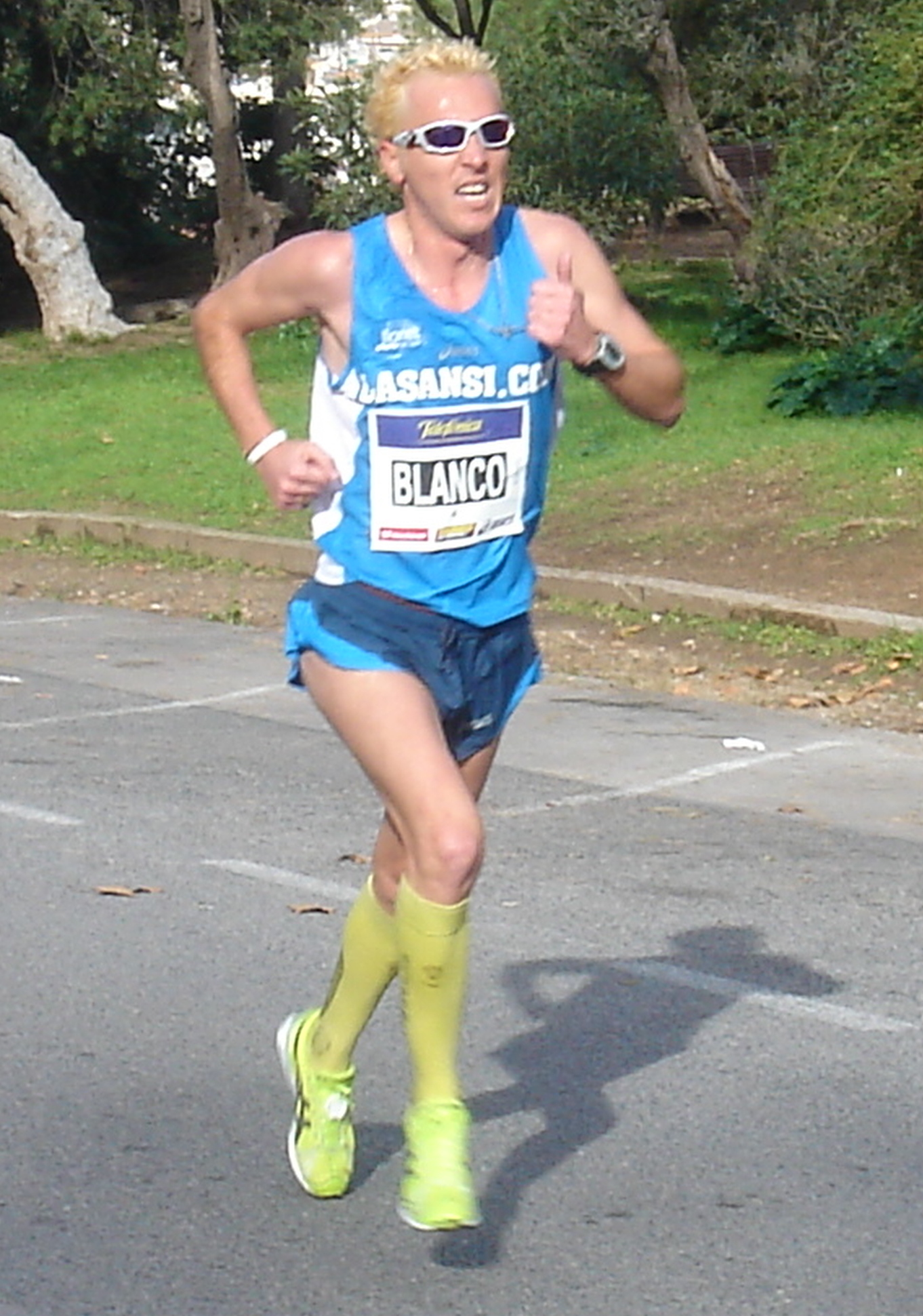
- Blanco in 2008

Personal information
- Nationality: Spain
- Born: 3 June 1975 (age 50) Lloret de Mar

José Luis Blanco Quevedo (Note: In this Spanish name, the first or paternal surname is Blanco and the second or maternal family name is Quevedo.) (born 3 June 1975 in Lloret de Mar) is a Spanish middle-distance runner who specialized in the 3000 metres steeplechase. Blanco won a silver medal in this event at the 2006 European Championships and the bronze medal at the 2010 European Championships, later being stripped of the latter.

== Career ==
At the 2006 European Championships, in a contest where pre-race favourite Simon Vroemen was ruled out due to food poisoning, Blanco tried to outrun the pack of competitors after the first three-thirds which were somewhat slow. Accelerating with 500 metres to go, Blanco led the race with one lap left. With 150 metres left, he was overcome by Jukka Keskisalo, but hung on to second place.

His personal best time is 8:12.86 minutes, achieved in Huelva in June 2006.

After winning the bronze medal at the 2010 European Championships, it was revealed that Blanco had tested positive for erythropoietin at the Spanish Championships earlier that year. He received a two-year doping ban and would be stripped of his bronze medal which would go to the fourth placer, Ion Luchianov.

Blanco also competed in cross-country running, featuring at the 2001, 2002, 2003, 2004, 2005, 2006, 2007, 2008 and 2009 World Cross Country Championships, with his best placement being a 27th place from 2002.

== International competitions ==
Year	Competition	Venue	Position	Event	Notes
1994	World Junior Championships	Lisbon, Portugal	6th	3000m steeplechase	8:39.85
1997	European U23 Championships	Turku, Finland	6th	3000m steeplechase	8:42.86
2000	Ibero-American Championships	Rio de Janeiro, Brazil	1st	3000 m steeple	8:28.44
2001	Mediterranean Games	Radès, Tunisia	2nd	3000 m steeple	8:34.94
2003	World Championships	Paris, France	8th	3000 m steeple	8:17.16
2004	Ibero-American Championships	Huelva, Spain	4th	3000 m steeple	8:39.39
2005	World Championships	Helsinki, Finland	14th	3000 m steeple	8:24.62
2006	European Championships	Göteborg, Sweden	2nd	3000 m steeple	8:26.22
2009	Mediterranean Games	Pescara, Italy	6th	3000 m steeple	8:38.54
2010	European Championships	Barcelona, Spain	DQ	3000 m steeple	~~8:19.15~~
2010	Continental Cup	Split, Croatia	DQ	3000 m steeple	~~8:48.79~~
