= Vincent Zouaoui-Dandrieux =

French long-distance runner

Vincent Zouaoui-Dandrieux (born 12 October 1980) is a French long-distance runner who specialises in the steeplechase. He represented France at the 2008 Beijing Olympics and at the 2012 London Olympics and competed at the World Championships in Athletics in 2007, 2009 and 2011. His personal best for the event is 8:14.74 minutes.

Born in Saint-Michel, Charente, he began competing in 1997 and in his first international selections for France he came 52nd in the junior race at the 1999 European Cross Country Championships, then went on to finish ninth in the steeplechase at the 2001 European Athletics U23 Championships. At the 2003 Summer Universiade he won his first international medal, taking the silver in the steeplechase behind Spain's César Pérez. He represented France at the 2005 Mediterranean Games in June, coming sixth, and improved his steeplechase personal best 8:16.55 minutes at the KBC Night of Athletics. This led to an appearance at the 2007 World Championships in Athletics, where he was eliminated in the first round.

At the 2008 IAAF Golden League's Meeting Gaz de France in Paris, he came fifth in his speciality, improving his best time to 8:14.74 minutes and finishing one place behind fellow Frenchman Bouabdellah Tahri. Alongside Tahri and Mahiedine Mekhissi-Benabbad, he was one of three representatives for France in the men's steeplechase at the 2008 Beijing Olympics, but Zouaoui-Dandrieux did not progress pass the heats stage.

In 2009, he won the national title in the steeplechase at the French Athletics Championships. At the 2009 European Team Championships he helped France to fourth place in the rankings with his silver medal performance in the steeplechase behind Mustafa Mohamed. He returned to the global stage at the 2009 World Championships in Athletics, but was again eliminated in the first round. The following season he competed at the 2010 European Athletics Championships, but managed only ninth place in his heat.

At the 2011 European Team Championships, he had his first win on the international stage, seeing off Steffen Uliczka to claim the gold medal in the steeplechase.
