= Steffen Uliczka =

German steeplechase runner (born 1984)

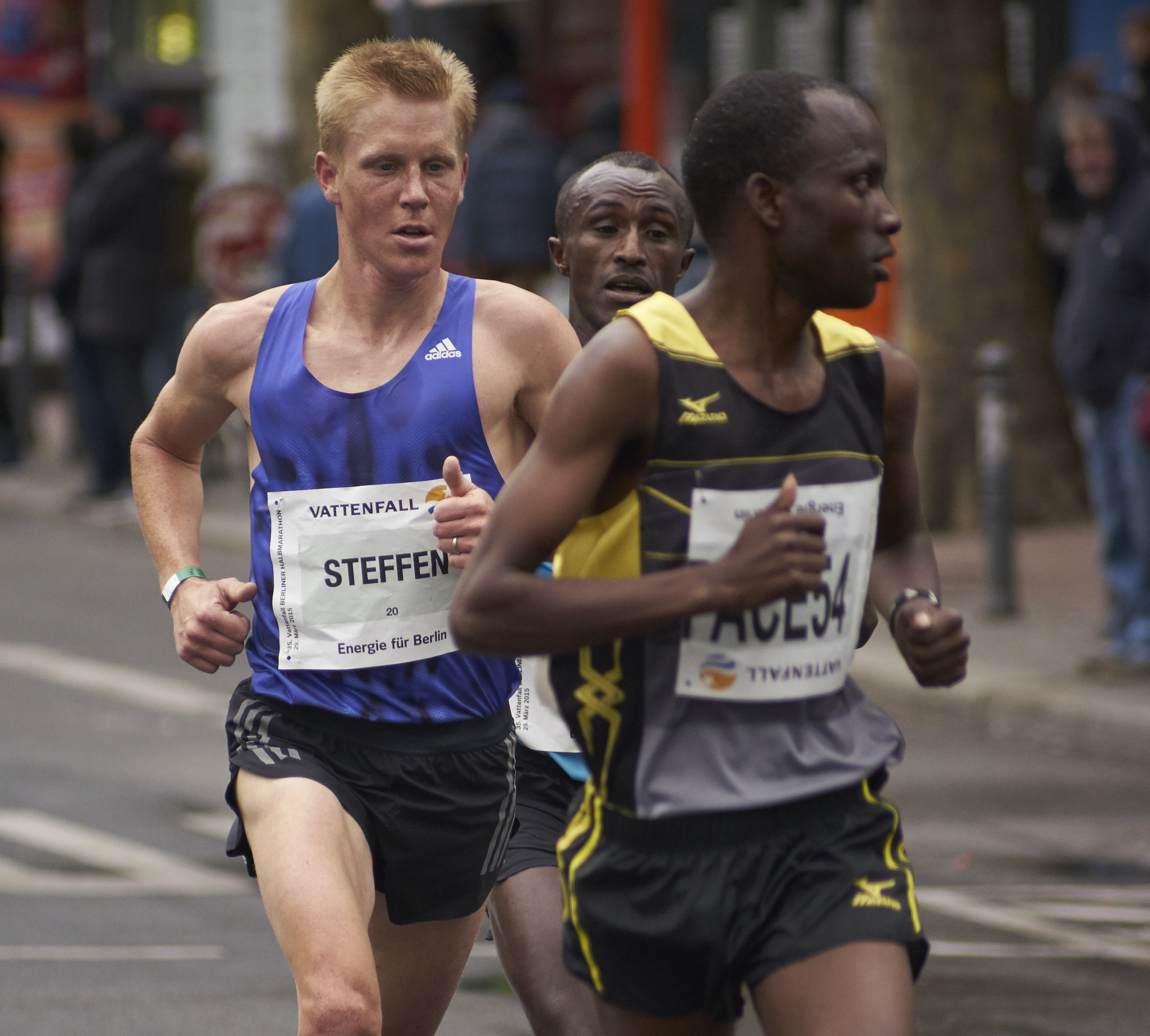
Steffen Uliczka, with Tolossa Chengere (centre) and Shadrack Kimaiyo (right) at the Berlin Half Marathon 2015

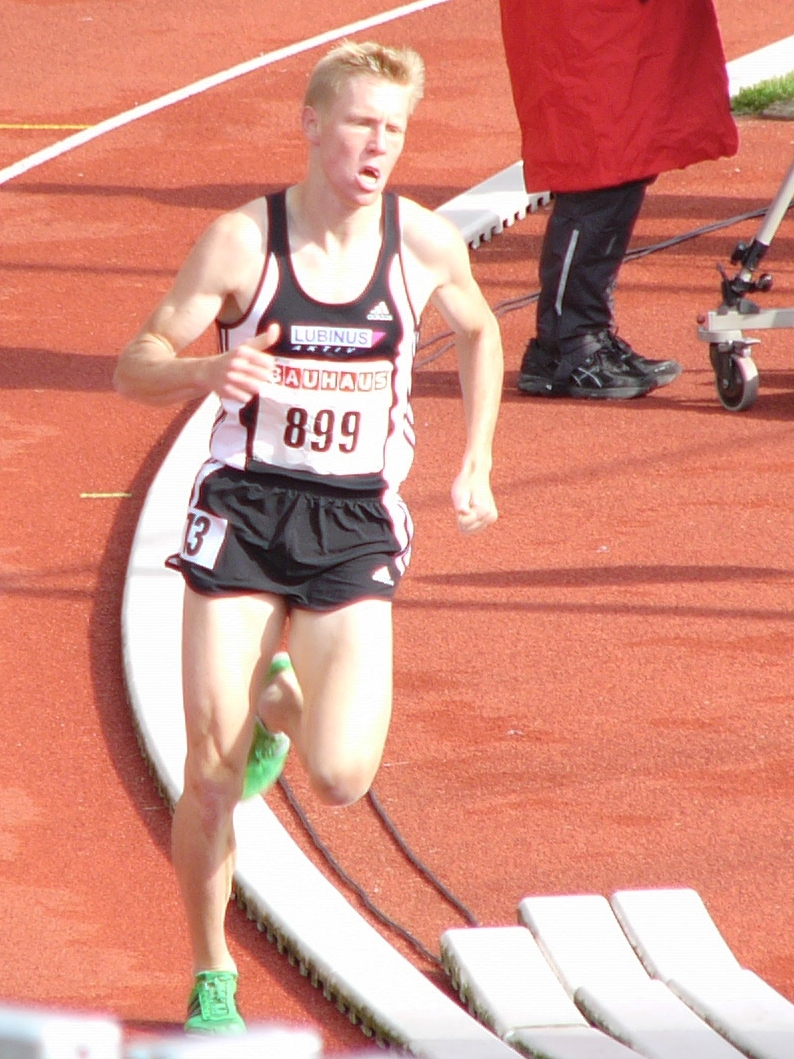
Steffen Uliczka at the 2011 German Athletics Championships in Kassel

Steffen Uliczka (born 17 July 1984 in Preetz) is a German track and field athlete who mainly competes in 3000 metres steeplechase. He has won the 2010 Warandecross cross country meeting in Tilburg, Netherlands. In 2014, he turned to compete for long-distance running.

== Achievements ==
Year	Competition	Venue	Position	Event	Notes
Representing Germany
2003	European Junior Championships	Tampere, Finland	9th	3000 m steeplechase	9:10.03
2005	European U23 Championships	Erfurt, Germany	18th (h)	3000 m steeplechase	8:58.37
2007	Universiade	Bangkok, Thailand	4th	3000 m steeplechase	8:33.93
2009	Universiade	Belgrade, Serbia	3rd	3000 m steeplechase	8:26.18
2009	World Championships	Berlin, Germany	24th (h)	3000 m steeplechase	8:37.83
2010	European Team Championships	Bergen, Norway	2nd	3000 m steeplechase	8:33.39
2010	European Championships	Barcelona, Spain	7th	3000 m steeplechase	8:25.39
2011	European Team Championships	Stockholm, Sweden	2nd	3000 m steeplechase	8:31.01
2011	World Championships	Daegu, South Korea	27th (h)	3000 m steeplechase	8:37.35
2012	European Championships	Helsinki, Finland	9th	3000 m steeplechase	8:41.53
2012	Olympic Games	London, United Kingdom	33rd (h)	3000 m steeplechase	8:41.08
2013	World Championships	Moscow, Russia	18th (h)	3000 m steeplechase	8:28.32
2014	European Championships	Zürich, Switzerland	7th	3000 m steeplechase	8:32.99
