= Ion Luchianov =

Moldovan-Russian steeplechase runner

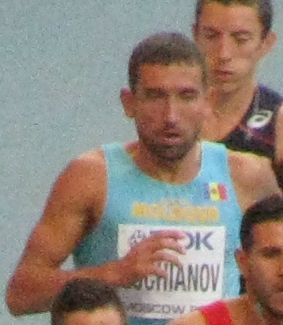
Luchianov in 2013

Ion Luchianov (Russian: Иван Лукьянов, Ivan Lukyanov; born 31 January 1981 in Slobozia-Duşca) is a Moldovan-Russian steeplechaser. He competed for his native country at the 2004 Summer Olympics in Athens, Greece, where he finished ninth in his heat of the 3000 metres steeplechase therefore missing out on a place in the final. At the 2008 Summer Olympics in Beijing, China, he finished 12th in the final. At the 2012 Summer Olympics in London, United Kingdom, he finished tenth in the final.

He changed his sporting nationality in December 2013, choosing to compete for Russia over his native Moldova. He became eligible to represent Russia internationally in May 2014.

== Competition record ==
Year	Competition	Venue	Position	Event	Notes
Representing Moldova
1998	World Youth Games	Moscow, Russia	3rd	3000 m	8:32.10
1999	European Junior Championships	Riga, Latvia	5th	3000 m st	8:50.76
2000	World Junior Championships	Santiago, Chile	11th	3000 m st	9:16.32
2001	European U23 Championships	Amsterdam, Netherlands	23rd (h)	3000 m st	9:05.31
2003	European U23 Championships	Bydgoszcz, Poland	6th	3000 m st	8:35.12
2003	Universiade	Daegu, South Korea	5th	3000 m st	8:43.25
2004	Olympic Games	Athens, Greece	20th (h)	3000 m st	8:26.17
2005	Universiade	İzmir, Turkey	9th	5000 m	14:04.34
2005	Universiade	İzmir, Turkey	2nd	3000 m st	8:30.66
2005	World Championships	Helsinki, Finland	27th (h)	3000 m st	8:32.09
2006	European Championships	Gothenburg, Sweden	15th	3000 m st	8:34.86
2007	Universiade	Bangkok, Thailand	3rd	3000 m st	8:23.83
2008	Olympic Games	Beijing, China	12th	3000 m st	8:27.82
2009	Universiade	Belgrade, Serbia	1st	3000 m st	8:25.79
2009	World Championships	Berlin, Germany	18th (h)	3000 m st	8:27.41
2010	World Indoor Championships	Doha, Qatar	17th (h)	3000 m	8:15.91
2010	European Championships	Barcelona, Spain	3rd	3000 m st	8:19.64
2011	World Championships	Daegu, South Korea	8th	3000 m st	8:19.69
2012	Olympic Games	London, United Kingdom	10th	3000 m st	8:28.15
2013	World Championships	Moscow, Russia	10th	3000 m st	8:19.99
Representing Russia
2014	European Championships	Zurich, Switzerland	5th	3000 m st	8:32.50
