= Mohamed Khaled Belabbas =

Algerian runner

Mohamed Khaled Belabbas (born 4 July 1981 in L'Haÿ-les-Roses, France) is an Algerian runner. He competed in the 3000 m steeplechase event at the 2012 Summer Olympics.
