= Matteo Villani (athlete) =

Italian steeplechase runner

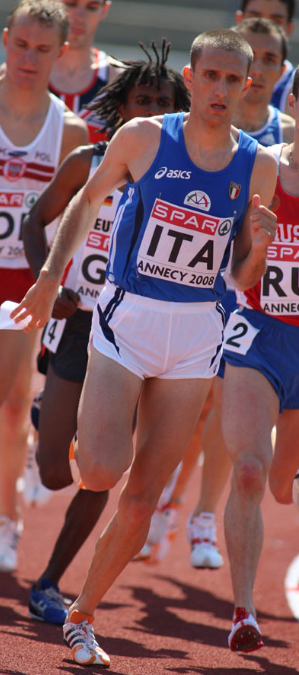
- Villani in 2008

Personal information
- Nationality: Italian
- Born: 29 August 1982 (age 43) San Secondo Parmense, Parma, Italy
- Height: 1.80 m (5 ft 11 in)
- Weight: 64 kg (141 lb)

Sport
- Country: Italy
- Sport: Athletics
- Event: Steeplechase
- Club: C.S. Carabinieri
- Coached by: Renzo Fineli

Achievements and titles
- Personal best: 3000 m st: 8:21.73 (2008)

Matteo Villani (born 29 August 1982) is an Italian steeplechase runner.

== Biography ==
Villani was born in San Secondo Parmense, Parma. He represented Italy at the 2008 Summer Olympics in Beijing, and competed in the men's 3000 m steeplechase. He ran in the first heat of the event, against twelve other competitors, including France's Bouabdellah Tahri and Kenya's Brimin Kipruto (who eventually won the gold medal in the final), but did not finish the entire race. Villani also achieved his personal best time of 8:21.73, at a meeting in Heusden-Zolder, Belgium.

== National titles ==
Villani has won the individual national championships twice.

- 2 wins in 3000 metres steeplechase (2009, 2012)

== See also ==
- Italian all-time lists - 3000 metres steeplechase
