= Jukka Keskisalo =

Finnish athletics competitor (born 1981)

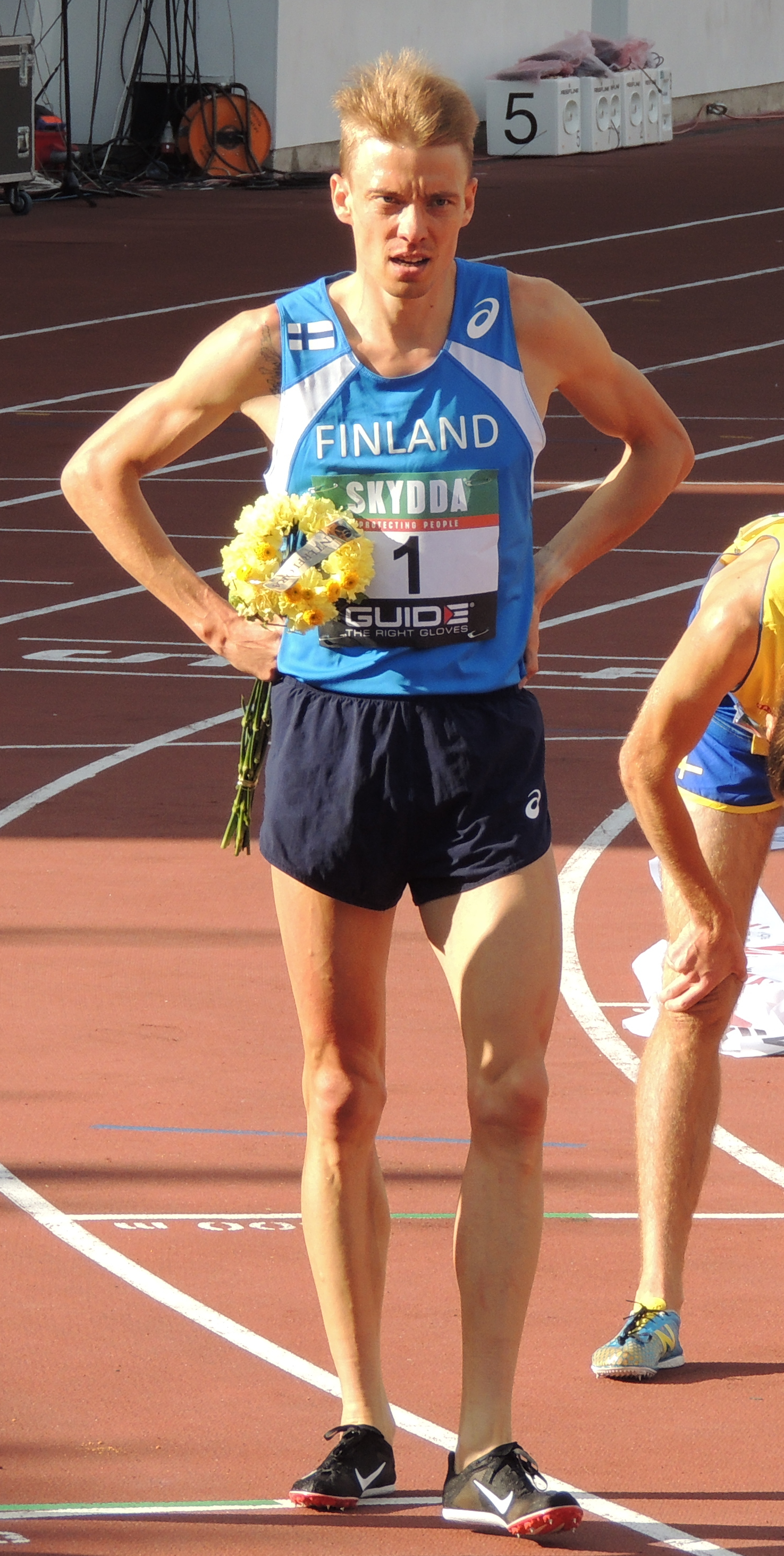

Personal information
- Full name: Jukka Pekka Sakari Keskisalo
- Nationality: Finnish
- Born: 27 March 1981 (age 45) Varkaus, Finland
- Height: 184 cm (6 ft 1/2 in)
- Weight: 66 kg (146 lb; 10.4 st)
- Website: www.jukkakeskisalo.fi

Sport
- Country: Finland
- Sport: Running
- Event: 3000 m steeplechase
- Club: Joensuun Kataja
- Coached by: Tommy Ekblom 2001-08; Risto Ulmala 2009; Ismo Hämäläinen 2009-

Achievements and titles
- Olympic finals: 2008: 3000m st DNS
- World finals: 2003: 3000 m st 9th 2005: 3000 m st 7h2 2009: 3000 m st 8th
- Regional finals: 2006: 3000 m st (gold)
- National finals: 2008: 3000 m st (gold); 2009: 1500 m (gold)
- Personal bests: 1500 m: 3:38.90 (2009); 3000 m: 7:49.05 (2009); 5000 m: 13:39.81 (2009); 10,000 m: 29:07.66 (2009); 3000 m st: 8:10.67 (2009, NR)
Medal record
European Championships
Gold medal – first place	2006 Gothenburg	3000 m st

Jukka Pekka Sakari Keskisalo (born 27 March 1981) is a Finnish athlete competing in 3000 m steeplechase and 1500 m. He won the 3000 m steeplechase at the 2006 European Championships in Athletics in Gothenburg and was also an Olympian in 2012.

== Biography ==
=== Background ===
Born in Varkaus, Pohjois-Savo, Keskisalo took a medal in the junior race at the Nordic Cross Country Championships, winning the bronze in 2000.

=== Senior athletics career ===
==== 2000s ====
Keskisalo finished ninth at the 2003 World Championships in Athletics in Paris with his then personal best time, 8:17.72. The next two seasons were hampered by injuries, but he made a strong comeback in 2006 by taking surprise gold at the 2006 European Championships in Athletics. He ran a tactical race, taking advantage of a slow early pace and staying at the rear of the field until the last 500 metres, when he sprinted and overtook the other competitors one by one.

Less than a week after the European Championships, Keskisalo placed fourth at the Golden League meet in Zürich with his new record time 8:16.74. Later, Keskisalo was voted Finnish Sportspersonality of the year, ahead of Tanja Poutiainen and Tero Pitkämäki.

In 2007 Keskisalo suffered from injuries again. In 2008 he competed for a place in and was selected for the Olympics, however he injured just a few days before his event and was not able to compete. Later in the autumn it was announced that Risto Ulmala would replace Tommy Ekblom as his coach.

In 2009 Keskisalo broke his personal best record time twice before the World Championships in Berlin; first a time of 8:15.59 when finishing third at the Golden League event Meeting Areva in Paris, and later a time of 8:12.93 at the Super Grand Prix event Herculis in Monaco. At the World Championships steeplechase final Keskisalo achieved his best result at the global level when finishing eighth with a time of 8:14.47. On 28 August Keskisalo finally broke Tapio Kantanen's 33 years old Finnish record when finishing sixth in a time of 8:10.67 in Weltklasse Zürich. Keskisalo split from coach Ulmala after the 2009 season. His new coach Ismo Hämäläinen was announced in October 2009. Hämäläinen is more known from cross country skiing and had coached Germany in sprint skiing shortly before.

==== 2010s ====
In 2012 Keskisalo was able to compete at the Olympics but did not finish the steeplechase final.
