= Pieter Desmet =

Belgian steeplechase runner (born 1983)

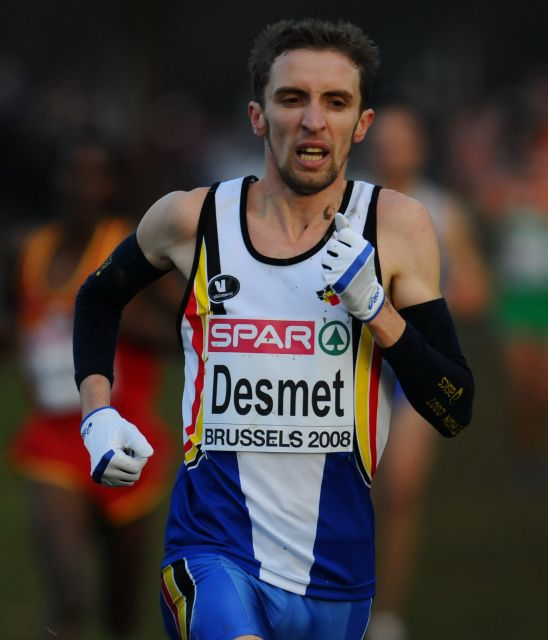

Personal information
- Nationality: Belgium
- Born: 7 June 1983 (age 43) Kortrijk, Belgium
- Height: 1.77 m (5 ft 9 1/2 in)
- Weight: 57 kg (126 lb)

Sport
- Sport: Athletics
- Event: Steeplechase
- Club: Atletiek Zuid-West (BEL)
- Coached by: Dirk de Maesschulck (BEL)

Achievements and titles
- Personal best: 3000 m st: 8:15.02 (2007)

Pieter Desmet (born 7 June 1983 in Kortrijk) is a Belgian steeplechase and long-distance runner. He is a two-time national champion for his category, and a member of Atletiek Zuid-West Club in Zwevegem, being coached and trained by Dirk de Maesschulck. He also achieved a personal best time of 8:15.02, at a world meeting in Heusden-Zolder, Belgium.

Desmet represented Belgium at the 2008 Summer Olympics in Beijing, and competed for the men's 3000 m steeplechase. He ran in the third heat of the event, against twelve other competitors, including South Africa's Ruben Ramolefi, and Kenya's Richard Mateelong. He finished and completed the race in eleventh place, with a time of 8:37.99, failing to advance into the final round.

Desmet also improved his time of 8:31.81 at the 2009 IAAF World Championships in Berlin, Germany, finishing ninth in the heats.

== Personal bests ==
Event	Time (sec)	Venue	Date
1500 metres	3:50.73	Nivelles, Belgium	15 August 2003
3000 metres	8:05.20	Tessenderlo, Belgium	30 August 2003
5000 metres	14:15.55	Nijmegen, Netherlands	24 May 2003
10,000 metres	28:33.44	Palo Alto, California, United States	4 May 2008
3000 metres steeplechase	8:15.02	Heusden, Netherlands	28 July 2007

- All information taken from IAAF profile.
