= Halil Akkaş =

Turkish middle-distance runner

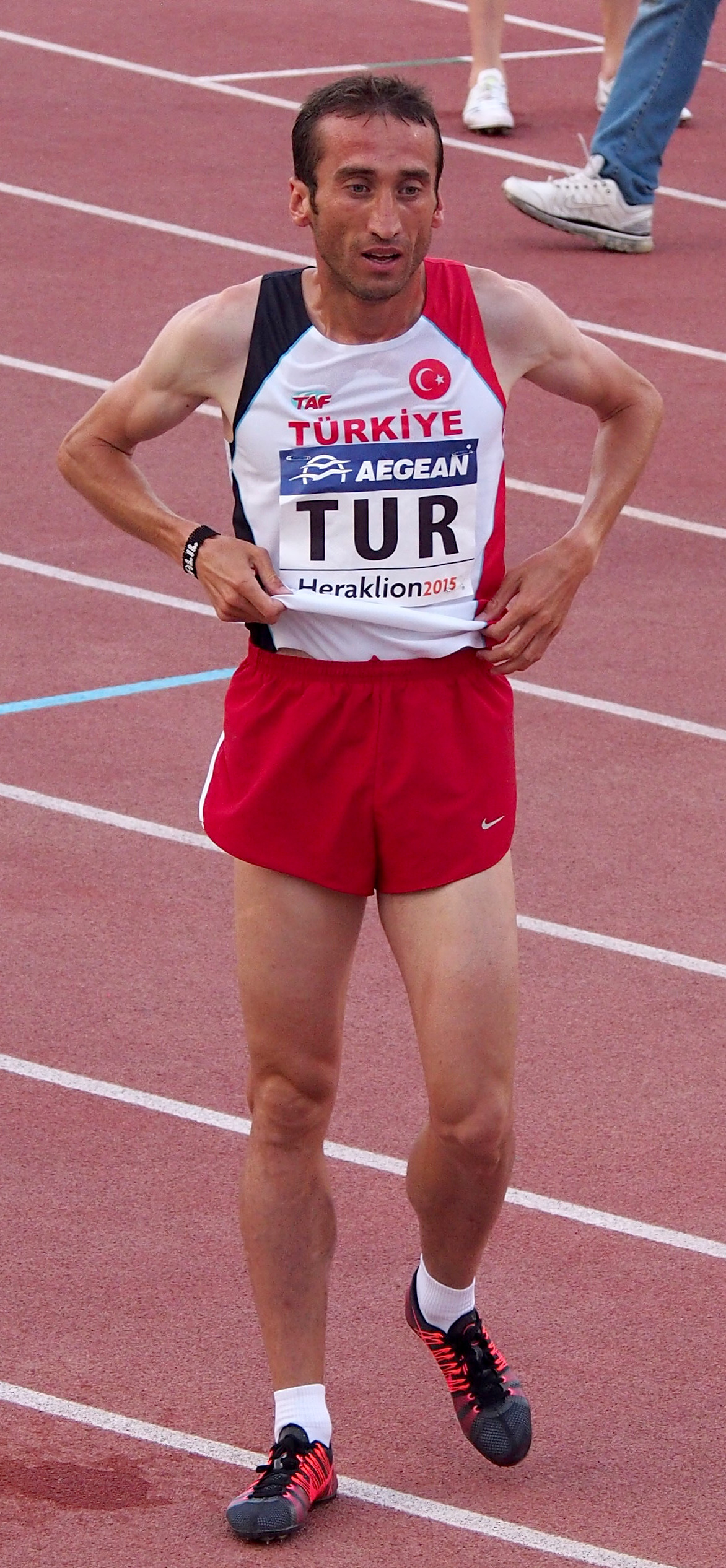
- Akkas at the 2015 European Team Championships

Personal information
- Born: 1 July 1983 (age 43) Kütahya, Turkey
- Education: Dumlupınar University
- Height: 175 cm (5 ft 9 in)
- Weight: 58 kg (128 lb)

Sport
- Sport: Athletics
- Events: Steeplechase, 1500–10,000 m
- Club: Fenerbahçe Athletics

Achievements and titles
- Personal bests: 1500 m – 3:39.48 (2007); 3000 m – 7:45.74 (indoor)(2007); 2000 m – 5:01.29 (2007); 3000 mS – 8:18.43 (2007); 5000 m – 13:28.39 (indoor) (2006); 10,000 m – 28:31.82 (2013)
Medal record
Representing Turkey
European Team Championships
Silver medal – second place	2013 Gateshead	3000 m
European Indoor Championships
Bronze medal – third place	2011 Paris	3000 m
Summer Universiade
Gold medal – first place	2005 Izmir	3,000 m steeple
Gold medal – first place	2007 Bangkok	5,000 m
Gold medal – first place	2007 Bangkok	3,000 m steeple
Gold medal – first place	2009 Belgrade	5,000 m
Silver medal – second place	2009 Belgrade	3,000 m steeple
Silver medal – second place	2011 Shenzhen	3,000 m steeple
Mediterranean Games
Bronze medal – third place	2009 Pescara	3,000 m steeple

Halil Akkaş (born 1 July 1983) is a Turkish middle-distance runner who won the 3000 m steeplechase at the 2005 Summer Universiade. He finished fourth in the 5000 m final at the 2006 European Athletics Championships in Gothenburg. At the 2007 European Athletics Indoor Championships he competed in 3000 m and finished fourth. He also finished fourth in the 1500 m final at the 2006 IAAF World Indoor Championships in Moscow and sixth in the 3000 m steeplechase at the 2007 IAAF World Championships in Osaka.
