= Mustafa Mohamed =

Swedish long-distance runner (born 1979)

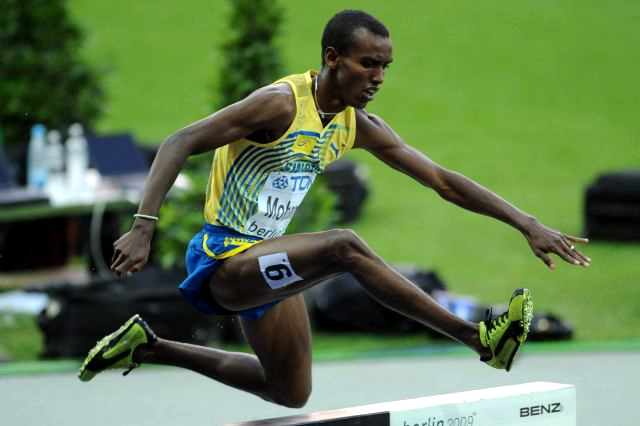
- Mohamed competing at the 2009 World Championships

Medal record

Representing Sweden

Men's athletics

European Cross Country Championships
Silver medal – second place	2007 Toro	Individual
Bronze medal – third place	2006 San Giorgio su Legnano	Individual
Bronze medal – third place	2008 Brussels	Individual

European Team Championships
Gold medal – first place	2009 Leiria	3000 m steeplechase

Mustafa Hassan Mohamed (Somali: Mustafa Xasan Maxamed, Arabic: مصطفى حسن محمد; born 1 March 1979) is a Swedish long-distance runner who mainly competes in the 3000 meter steeplechase.

== Personal life ==
Mohamed was born in 1979 in Mogadishu, Somalia. He later moved to Sweden at the age of 11, eventually becoming a Swedish citizen. He presently lives in Lysekil. He represents Hälle IF.

== Athletic career ==
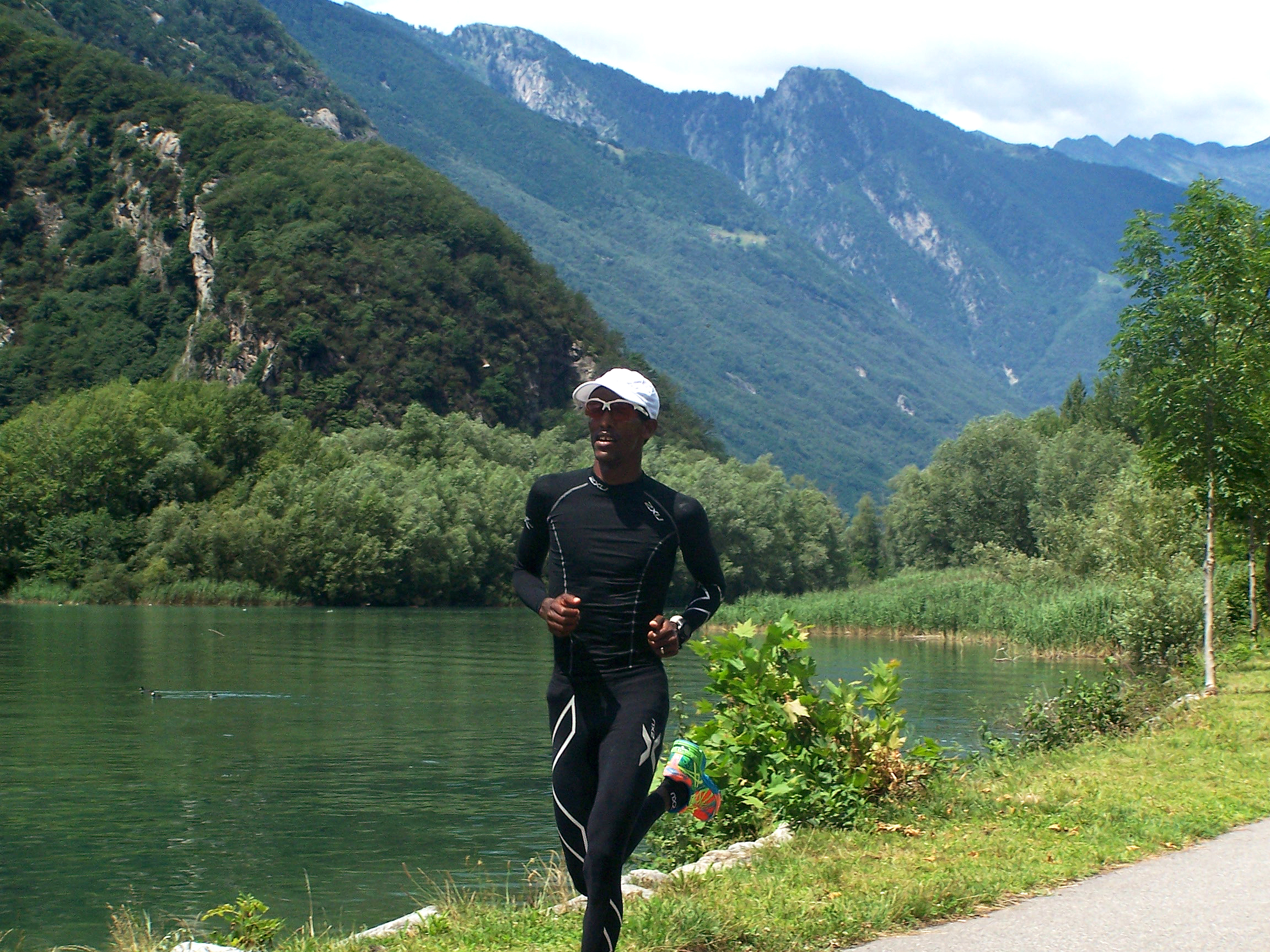
Mohamed training in the mountains of St. Moritz, 2014.

Having finished eighth for Sweden at the 1998 World Junior Championships, Mohamed progressed significantly over the next few years. In 2003, he lowered his personal best time from 8:32 to 8:23 in the 3000 meter steeplechase. He later ran the event in 8:18.05 minutes at the 2004 Olympics.

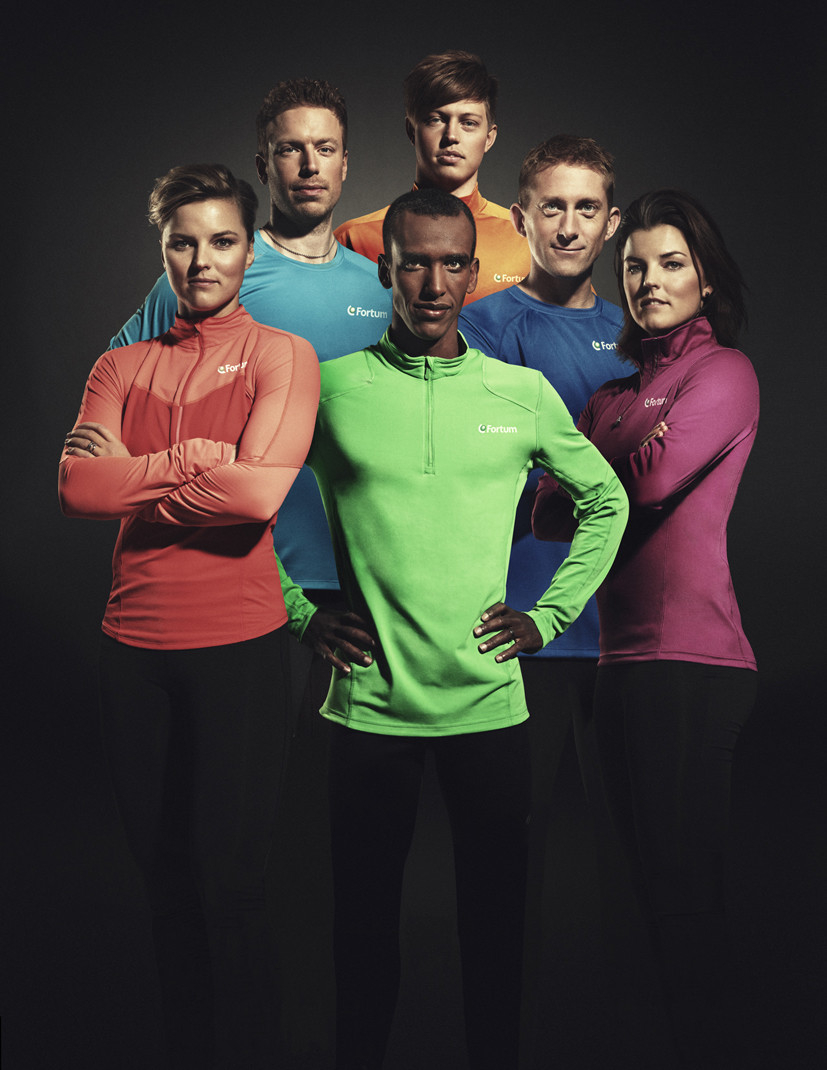
Mohamed and other Team Fortum members Sanna Kallur, Magnus Arvidsson, Nicklas Wiberg, Yannick Tregaro and Jenny Kallur.

Mohamed reached the podium three times at the Nordic Cross Country Championships: first winning a bronze in the men's junior race at the inaugural edition in 1997, then going on to win a silver medal in the senior race in 2003, and finally taking the gold in 2006. He won at the Eurocross meeting in 2006, and then went on to take a bronze medal at the 2006 European Cross Country Championships later in the year.

At the 2005 World Championships, Mohamed finished tenth. He improved upon that the following year in Stockholm with a time of 8:14.67. A month later in August 2006, he finished fourth at the 2006 European Athletics Championships.

On 28 July 2007, Mohamed posted a time of 8:05.75, thereby beating the 31-year-old Swedish record. Later that season, he finished fourth in the 2007 World Championships.

On 21 June 2009, Mohamed competed in and took home gold at the 1st SPAR European Team Championships in Leiria, Portugal.

At the 2010 Swedish Athletics Championships, he completed a triple long-distance victory by winning the 3000 m steeplechase, 5000 metres, and 10,000 metres. This made him only the second man to complete the feat, after Dan Glans' 1976 wins.

In 2012, Mohamed made his debut over the marathon distance at the Hamburg Marathon. He finished in the top ten with a time of 2:12:28 hours.

In 2020, he beat the 36-year-old Swedish record on marathon by running on 2:10:03 in Sevilla.

== Notes ==
Records
Preceded by Anders Gärderud	Men's 3000 m steeplechase Swedish record holder 28 July 2007 –	Succeeded by Current holder
