= 2016 European Athletics Championships – Men's 3000 metres steeplechase =

Men's 3000 metres steeplechase at the European Athletics Championships
- Venue: Amsterdam
- Location: Olympic Stadium
- Dates: 6 July (round 1); 8 July (final)
- Competitors: 26 from 15 nations
- Winning time: 8:25.63

Medalists
gold medal	Mahiedine Mekhissi-Benabbad	France
silver medal	Aras Kaya	Turkey
bronze medal	Yoann Kowal	France

The men's 3000 metre steeplechase at the 2016 European Athletics Championships took place at the Olympic Stadium on 6 and 8 July.

== Records ==
Standing records prior to the 2014 European Athletics Championships
World record	Saif Saaeed Shaheen (QAT)	7:53.63	Brussels, Belgium	3 September 2004
European record	Mahiedine Mekhissi-Benabbad (FRA)	8:00.09	Paris, France	6 July 2013
Championship record	Mahiedine Mekhissi-Benabbad (FRA)	8:07.87	Barcelona, Spain	1 August 2010
World Leading	Conseslus Kipruto (KEN)	8:00.12	Birmingham, United Kingdom	5 June 2016
European Leading	Yoann Kowal (FRA)	8:17.83	Rome, Italy	2 June 2016

== Schedule ==
Date	Time	Round
6 July 2016	17:55	Round 1
8 July 2016	21:25	Final

All times are local times (UTC+2)

== Results ==
=== Round 1 ===
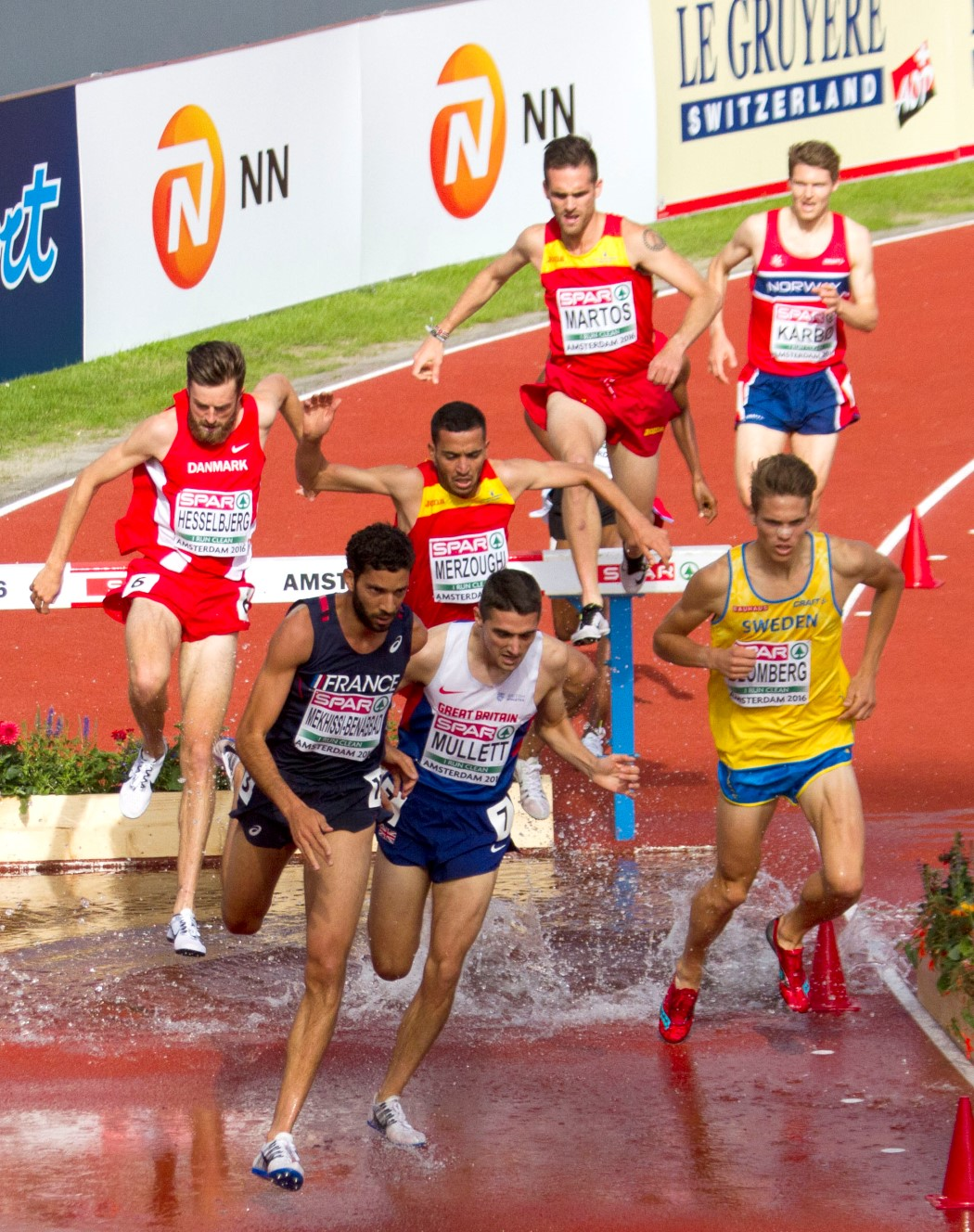
Heat 1

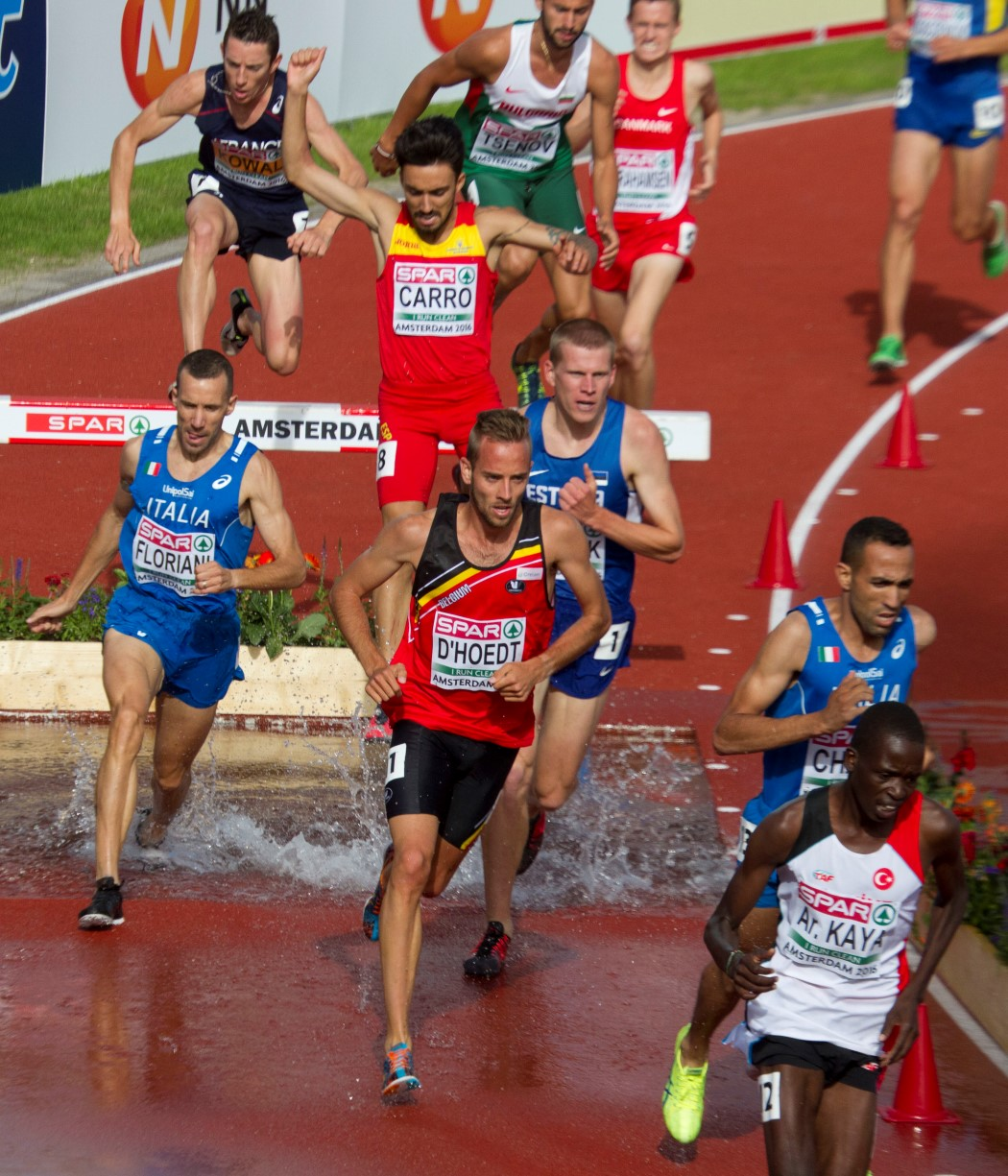
Heat 2

First 5 in each heat (Q) and 5 best performers (q) advance to the Final.

Rank	Heat	Name	Nationality	Time	Note
1	1	Mahiedine Mekhissi-Benabbad	France	8:31.42	Q
2	1	Krystian Zalewski	Poland	8:31.50	Q
3	1	Sebastián Martos	Spain	8:31.98	Q, SB
4	1	Rob Mullett	Great Britain	8:32.06	Q
5	1	Ole Hesselbjerg	Denmark	8:32.17	Q
6	1	Abdoullah Bamoussa	Italy	8:32.54	q, PB
7	2	Aras Kaya	Turkey	8:33.11	Q
8	1	Hakan Duvar	Turkey	8:33.13	q, SB
DQ	2	Jamel Chatbi	Italy	8:33.25	Q
10	2	Yoann Kowal	France	8:33.51	Q
11	2	Fernando Carro	Spain	8:33.69	Q, SB
12	2	Kaur Kivistik	Estonia	8:33.94	Q, SB
13	1	Abdelaziz Merzoughi	Spain	8:34.34	q
14	1	Emil Blomberg	Sweden	8:34.81	q, PB
15	2	Yuri Floriani	Italy	8:34.82	q
16	1	Tom Erling Kårbø	Norway	8:42.72	
17	2	Jeroen D'Hoedt	Belgium	8:42.75	
18	1	Tarık Langat Akdağ	Turkey	8:43.81	
19	2	Mitko Tsenov	Bulgaria	8:45.55	
20	2	Bjørnar Ustad Kristensen	Norway	8:54.73	
21	2	Elmar Engholm	Sweden	8:55.21	
22	2	Djilali Bedrani	France	8:57.27	
23	1	Tomas Cotter	Ireland	9:08.82	
24	1	Noam Ne'eman	Israel	9:15.80	
	2	Jakob Dybdal Abrahamsen	Denmark	DNF	
	2	Vadym Slobodenyuk	Ukraine	DNF	

=== Final ===
Rank	Name	Nationality	Time	Note
1st place, gold medalist(s)	Mahiedine Mekhissi-Benabbad	France	8:25.63	
2nd place, silver medalist(s)	Aras Kaya	Turkey	8:29.91	PB
3rd place, bronze medalist(s)	Yoann Kowal	France	8:30.79	
4	Sebastián Martos	Spain	8:31.93	SB
DQ	Jamel Chatbi	Italy	8:32.43	
5	Rob Mullett	Great Britain	8:33.29	
6	Kaur Kivistik	Estonia	8:33.75	SB
7	Abdoullah Bamoussa	Italy	8:35.35	
8	Yuri Floriani	Italy	8:35.94	
9	Fernando Carro	Spain	8:40.73	
10	Ole Hesselbjerg	Denmark	8:42.27	
11	Hakan Duvar	Turkey	8:44.03	
12	Emil Blomberg	Sweden	8:48.98	
13	Abdelaziz Merzoughi	Spain	8:51.37	
	Krystian Zalewski	Poland	DNS	
