= 2014 European Athletics Championships – Men's 3000 metres steeplechase =

Men's 3000 metres steeplechase at the European Athletics Championships

The men's 3000 metre steeplechase at the 2014 European Athletics Championships took place at the Letzigrund on 12 and 14 August. Mahiedine Mekhissi-Benabbad of France won the race, but he was later disqualified after he took off his shirt while running down the home straight. Yoann Kowal (France) was then awarded gold, Krystian Zalewski (Poland) silver and Angel Mullera (Spain) bronze.

Mullera was booed by the public during the medal ceremony. After the French anthem had been played, Kowal joined Zalewski on the silver medal podium step, ostensibly ignoring the Spaniard.

== Medalists ==
Gold	Yoann Kowal; France
Silver	Krystian Zalewski; Poland
Bronze	Ángel Mullera; Spain

== Records ==
Standing records prior to the 2014 European Athletics Championships
World record	Saif Saaeed Shaheen (QAT)	7:53.63	Brussels, Belgium	3 September 2004
European record	Mahiedine Mekhissi-Benabbad (FRA)	8:00.09	Paris, France	6 July 2013
Championship record	Mahiedine Mekhissi-Benabbad (FRA)	8:07.87	Barcelona, Spain	1 August 2010
World Leading	Jairus Kipchoge Birech (KEN)	8:02.37	Oslo, Norway	11 June 2014
European Leading	Mahiedine Mekhissi-Benabbad (FRA)	8:07.45	Sotteville-lès-Rouen, France	14 June 2014

== Schedule ==
Date	Time	Round
12 August 2014	12:20	Round 1
14 August 2014	20:45	Final

All times are local times (UTC+2)

== Results ==
=== Round 1 ===
First 5 in each heat (Q) and 5 best performers (q) advance to the Final.

Rank	Heat	Name	Nationality	Time	Note
1	2	Mateusz Demczyszak	Poland	8:31.62	Q
2	2	Martin Grau	Germany	8:32.35	Q
3	2	Yuri Floriani	Italy	8:33.05	Q
4	2	Tarık Langat Akdağ	Turkey	8:33.39	Q
5	2	Mahiedine Mekhissi-Benabbad	France	8:33.44	Q
6	2	Nikolay Chavkin	Russia	8:34.29	q
7	2	Sebastián Martos	Spain	8:34.35	q
8	1	Krystian Zalewski	Poland	8:35.44	Q
9	1	Mitko Tsenov	Bulgaria	8:35.45	Q
10	1	Jukka Keskisalo	Finland	8:35.98	Q
11	1	Yoann Kowal	France	8:36.27	Q
12	2	Ángel Mullera	Spain	8:36.33	q, SB
13	2	Janne Ukonmaanaho	Finland	8:36.44	q
14	1	Steffen Uliczka	Germany	8:36.59	Q
15	1	Ivan Lukyanov	Russia	8:37.02	q
16	2	Andrey Farnosov	Russia	8:37.31	
17	1	James Wilkinson	Great Britain	8:39.78	
18	1	Hakan Duvar	Turkey	8:42.03	
19	1	Tom Erling Kårbø	Norway	8:42.33	
20	1	Daniel Lundgren	Sweden	8:43.98	
21	2	Vadym Slobodenyuk	Ukraine	8:43.99	
22	2	Noam Ne'eman	Israel	8:45.33	
23	1	Patrick Nasti	Italy	8:46.80	
24	2	Alberto Paulo	Portugal	8:47.18	
25	1	Christian Steinhammer	Austria	8:58.58	
26	1	Justinas Beržanskis	Lithuania	9:01.56	
27	2	Albert Minczér	Hungary	9:32.13	
	1	Víctor García	Spain	DNF	

=== Final ===
Rank	Name	Nationality	Time	Note
1st place, gold medalist(s)	Yoann Kowal	France	8:26.66	
2nd place, silver medalist(s)	Krystian Zalewski	Poland	8:27.11	
3rd place, bronze medalist(s)	Ángel Mullera	Spain	8:29.16	SB
4	Sebastián Martos	Spain	8:30.08	
5	Ivan Lukyanov	Russia	8:32.50	
6	Jukka Keskisalo	Finland	8:32.70	
7	Steffen Uliczka	Germany	8:32.99	
8	Tarık Langat Akdağ	Turkey	8:33.13	
9	Mitko Tsenov	Bulgaria	8:34.16	
10	Mateusz Demczyszak	Poland	8:34.32	
11	Janne Ukonmaanaho	Finland	8:42.45	
12	Yuri Floriani	Italy	8:44.05	
13	Martin Grau	Germany	8:44.46	
14	Nikolay Chavkin	Russia	8:45.70	
	Mahiedine Mekhissi-Benabbad	France	DSQ	
