= Athletics at the 2016 Summer Olympics – Men's 3000 metres steeplechase =

Men's 3000 metres steeplechase at the Games of the XXXI Olympiad
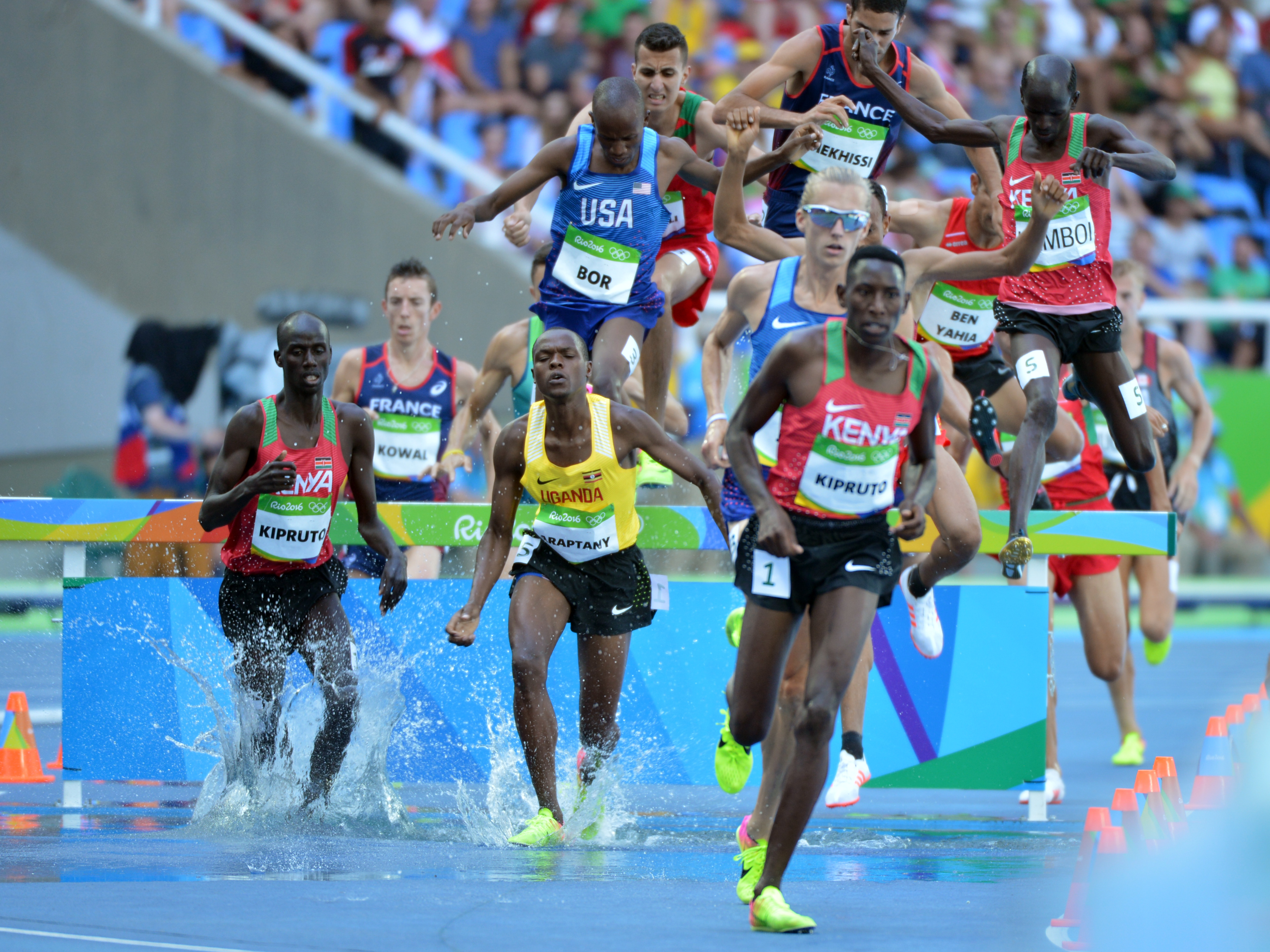
- The water jump during the Men's 3000m steeplechase
- Venue: Olympic Stadium
- Dates: 15 August 2016 (heats); 17 August 2016 (final)
- Competitors: 45 from 25 nations
- Winning time: 8:03.28 OR

Medalists
1st place, gold medalist(s)		Conseslus Kipruto	Kenya
2nd place, silver medalist(s)		Evan Jager	United States
3rd place, bronze medalist(s)		Mahiedine Mekhissi-Benabbad	France

The men's 3000 metres steeplechase competition at the 2016 Summer Olympics in Rio de Janeiro, Brazil was held at the Olympic Stadium between 15–17 August.

== Summary ==
Continuing the country's unbeaten tradition in the Olympic steeplechase since 1968, the principal challengers to the gold medal came from the Kenyan team. Ezekiel Kemboi returned to defend his 2012 Olympic title and had won almost every global final since 2003. His sole loss came at the 2008 Beijing Olympics to another member of the team Brimin Kipruto. The third Kenyan was Conseslus Kipruto, who was the 2015 World Championships runner-up and held the top three times that season, having won all of the 2016 IAAF Diamond League meets. The next highest ranked entrant at sixth was Bahrain's John Kibet Koech (himself a former Kenyan). The 2012 Olympic runner-up Mahiedine Mekhissi-Benabbad was also present.

In the past Kemboi has sported the frohawk, but at the start line for the final, the 34-year-old man was sporting the reverse mohawk. His prince in training, Conseslus Kipruto has watched his act from behind in the previous two world championships as had many other men in this field. Conseslus made it clear from the gun that this was not going to be a strategic race, rushing to the lead. Returning silver medalist Mahiedine Mekhissi-Benabbad immediately moved to cover the lead, while Evan Jager ran around the outside of the pack to join them at the front 200 metres into the race. By the first barrier, the race was already a string, rather than a pack. Over the next lap, Conseslus pressed the pace, with only Jager following. A gap opened back to the string of chasers, with Kemboi in the middle of the field. Through the next lap Jacob Araptany and Yemane Haileselassie trying to bridge the gap to Jager but also battling each other for the third position. 2008 gold medalist Brimin Kipruto moved up to join the challenge for third with Kemboi gliding along the inside to join the back of the leaders. The gap was disappearing. Suddenly at the last barrier before the end of the third lap, Araptany didn't appear to be prepared for the barrier, he just went down sliding under the barrier, his chin taking a knockout blow from the barrier with an audible crash. Following the next water jump, Jager moved past Conseslus, the pair tracked by Kemboi, Kenyan ex-pat Hillary Bor and Brimin. With Jager now pushing the pace, the gap again began to form, with just Conseslus and Kemboi in the lead group.

Prefaced by the 2015 Steeplechase at Paris, Jager had learned he could beat the Kenyans by pushing the pace early. Here he was attempting to do just that. After another lap and a half of this, the gap grew back to fourth place Bor, with Brimin falling back and Mekhissi-Benabbad at the tail of the second group. With less than two laps to go Amor Ben Yahia in the middle of the second group fell over the barrier, leaving Soufiane El Bakkali, Brimin, Bor, Mekhissi-Benabbad and Yoann Kowal the remaining string of chasers. Jager held the lead to just before the bell. Over the penultimate water jump, Kemboi moved into the marking position, but after the following barrier, Conseslus gathered himself and sprinted by both. Kemboi chased Conseslus to the barrier before the backstretch, to be in the perfect position to launch his patented surge. But the surge was not there for Kemboi, instead it was Conseslus who made the surge down the backstretch. By the final water jump, the gap was insurmountable and Conseslus knew it. He began waving to the crowd. Conseslus ran the final straight, arms outstretched celebrating his victory (as Kemboi had done before him). Behind him, Jager was not done, executing his final kick around the beaten Kemboi on the home stretch and pulling away to the silver medal. Kemboi jogged across the finish line in third. Well behind, Mekhissi-Benabbad used the same kind of final lap that had brought him to two previous silver medals to beat the group of chasers to the line in fourth.

After the race was over, the French team filed a protest, claiming Kemboi had stepped off the track following the first water jump. Video was reviewed of the race and the foul was detected, causing Kemboi to be disqualified, advancing Mekhissi-Benabbad to the bronze medal. That also made Mekhissi-Benabbad and not Kemboi, the first man to win three Olympic medals in the steeplechase. This was Kenya's ninth straight and eleventh overall gold medal in the steeplechase. Jager was the first American to win a medal in the steeplechase since Brian Diemer in 1984.

After dominating the event, with two Olympic gold medals, four World Championship gold medals (and three silvers before that), Ezekiel Kemboi announced his retirement after the race, only to retract it and compete for one more year after realizing that he was disqualified.

The medals for the competition were presented by Aïcha Garad Ali, Djibouti, member of the International Olympic Committee, and the gifts were presented by Bernard Amsalem, Council Member of the IAAF.

== Competition format ==
The men's 3000 m steeplechase competition consists of a heats stage (three races) and a final.

== Schedule ==
All times are Brasilia Time (UTC-3)

Date	Time	Round
Monday, 15 August 2016	10:25	Heats
Wednesday, 17 August 2016	11:50	Finals

== Records ==
Prior to the competition, the existing World and Olympic records were as follows.

World record	Saif Saaeed Shaheen (QAT)	7:53.63	Brussels, Belgium	3 September 2004
Olympic record	Julius Kariuki (KEN)	8:05.51	Seoul, South Korea	30 September 1988
2016 World leading	Conseslus Kipruto (KEN)	8:00.12	Birmingham, United Kingdom	5 June 2016

The following records were established during the competition:

Date	Event	Name	Nationality	Distance	Record
17 August	Final	Conseslus Kipruto	Kenya	8:03.28	OR

== Results ==
=== Heats ===
==== Heat 1 ====
Rank	Athlete	Nationality	Time	Notes
1	Hillary Bor	United States	8:25.01	Q
2	Soufiane El Bakkali	Morocco	8:25.17	Q
3	Ezekiel Kemboi	Kenya	8:25.51	Q
4	Matthew Hughes	Canada	8:26.27	q
5	Sebastian Martos	Spain	8:28.44	
6	Benjamin Kiplagat	Uganda	8:30.76	
7	Halil Akkas	Turkey	8:33.12	SB
8	Hailemariyam Amare	Ethiopia	8:35.01	
9	Nelson Cherutich	Bahrain	8:35.87	
10	Yuri Floriani	Italy	8:40.80	
11	Kazuya Shiojiri	Japan	8:40.98	
12	Rob Mullett	Great Britain	8:48.19	
13	Jeroen D'hoedt	Belgium	8:48.29	
14	Mitko Tsenov	Bulgaria	8:54.79	
–	Ali Messaoudi	Algeria	DQ	R163.3b

==== Heat 2 ====
Rank	Athlete	Nationality	Time	Notes
1	Evan Jager	United States	8:25.86	Q
2	Brimin Kipruto	Kenya	8:26.25	Q
3	Mahiedine Mekhissi-Benabbad	France	8:26.32	Q
4	Yemane Haileselassie	Eritrea	8:26.72	q
5	Hamid Ezzine	Morocco	8:27.69	q
6	John Kibet Koech	Bahrain	8:28.81	
7	Chala Beyo	Ethiopia	8:32.06	
8	Aras Kaya	Turkey	8:32.35	
9	José Peña	Venezuela	8:32.38	
10	Chris Winter	Canada	8:33.95	
11	Bilal Tabti	Algeria	8:38.87	
12	Abdoullah Bamoussa	Italy	8:42.81	
13	Kaur Kivistik	Estonia	8:44.25	
14	Abdalla Targan	Sudan	8:52.20	
15	Abdelaziz Merzougui	Spain	9:03.40	

==== Heat 3 ====
Rank	Athlete	Nationality	Time	Notes
1	Conseslus Kipruto	Kenya	8:21.40	Q
2	Jacob Araptany	Uganda	8:21.53	Q
3	Donald Cabral	United States	8:21.96	Q
4	Amor Ben Yahia	Tunisia	8:23.12	q
5	Yoann Kowal	France	8:23.49	q
6	Altobeli da Silva	Brazil	8:26.59	q
7	Hicham Sigueni	Morocco	8:27.82	
8	Hicham Bouchicha	Algeria	8:33.61	
9	Taylor Milne	Canada	8:34.38	
10	Krystian Zalewski	Poland	8:34.52	
11	Ole Hesselbjerg	Denmark	8:40.08	
12	Mohamed Ismail Ibrahim	Djibouti	8:53.10	
13	Fernando Carro	Spain	8:53.17	
–	Tafese Seboka	Ethiopia	DQ	R163.3b
–	Tarik Langat Akdag	Turkey	DNF	

=== Final ===
Rank	Athlete	Nationality	Time	Notes
1st place, gold medalist(s)	Conseslus Kipruto	Kenya	8:03.28	OR
2nd place, silver medalist(s)	Evan Jager	United States	8:04.28	SB
3rd place, bronze medalist(s)	Mahiedine Mekhissi-Benabbad	France	8:11.52	SB
4	Soufiane El Bakkali	Morocco	8:14.35	PB
5	Yoann Kowal	France	8:16.75	SB
6	Brimin Kipruto	Kenya	8:18.79	SB
7	Hillary Bor	United States	8:22.74	PB
8	Donald Cabral	United States	8:25.81	
9	Altobeli da Silva	Brazil	8:26.30	PB
10	Matthew Hughes	Canada	8:36.83	
11	Yemane Haileselassie	Eritrea	8:40.68	
–	Jacob Araptany	Uganda	DNF	
–	Hamid Ezzine	Morocco	DNF	
–	Amor Ben Yahia	Tunisia	DQ	R163.3b
–	Ezekiel Kemboi	Kenya	DQ	R163.3b
