= 2012 European Athletics Championships – Men's 3000 metres steeplechase =

Men's 3000 metres steeplechase at the European Athletics Championships

The men's 3000 metres steeplechase at the 2012 European Athletics Championships will held at the Helsinki Olympic Stadium on 27 and 29 June.

== Medalists ==
Gold	Mahiedine Mekhissi-Benabbad; France
Silver	Tarık Langat Akdağ; Turkey
Bronze	Víctor García; Spain

== Records ==
Standing records prior to the 2012 European Athletics Championships
World record	Saif Saaeed Shaheen (QAT)	7:53.63	Brussels, Belgium	3 September 2004
European record	Bouabdellah Tahri (FRA)	8:01.18	Berlin, Germany	18 August 2009
Championship record	Mahiedine Mekhissi-Benabbad (FRA)	8:07.87	Barcelona, Spain	1 August 2010
World Leading	Paul Kipsiele Koech (KEN)	7:54.31	Rome, Italy	31 May 2012
European Leading	Mahiedine Mekhissi-Benabbad (FRA)	8:10.90	Villeneuve-d'Ascq, France	9 June 2012

== Schedule ==
Date	Time	Round
27 June 2012	18:30	Round 1
29 June 2012	19:05	Final

== Results ==
=== Round 1 ===
First 4 in each heat (Q) and 7 best performers (q) advance to the Semifinals.

Rank	Heat	Name	Nationality	Time	Note
1	2	Tarık Langat Akdağ	Turkey	8:27.31	Q, SB
2	2	Ion Luchianov	Moldova	8:29.28	Q
3	2	Víctor García	Spain	8:29.44	Q
4	2	Łukasz Oślizło	Poland	8:29.46	Q
5	2	Abdelaziz Merzougui	Spain	8:29.51	q
6	2	Steffen Uliczka	Germany	8:29.55	q
7	1	Mahiedine Mekhissi-Benabbad	France	8:31.05	Q
DQ	1	Nordine Gezzar	France	~~8:31.33~~	Q, Doping
8	2	Yuri Floriani	Italy	8:32.63	q
9	1	Patrick Nasti	Italy	8:34.08	Q
10	1	Łukasz Parszczyński	Poland	8:35.05	Q
11	1	Antonio David Jiménez	Spain	8:35.44	q
12	2	Kaur Kivistik	Estonia	8:36.10	q, PB
13	1	Hakan Duvar	Turkey	8:37.40	q
14	1	Krystian Zalewski	Poland	8:37.82	q
15	1	James Wilkinson	Great Britain	8:39.19	
16	2	Noureddine Smaïl	France	8:41.11	
17	1	Alberto Paulo	Portugal	8:41.63	SB
18	2	Itai Maggidi	Israel	8:47.29	
19	1	Rob Mullett	Great Britain	8:48.38	
DQ	2	Ildar Minshin	Russia	~~8:52.84~~	Doping
20	1	Alexandru Ghinea	Romania	8:55.88	
	1	Jukka Keskisalo	Finland	DNS	
	1	Halil Akkaş	Turkey	DNF	
	2	Luke Gunn	Great Britain	DNF	

=== Final ===
Rank	Name	Nationality	Time	Note
1st place, gold medalist(s)	Mahiedine Mekhissi-Benabbad	France	8:33.23	
2nd place, silver medalist(s)	Tarık Langat Akdağ	Turkey	8:35.24	
3rd place, bronze medalist(s)	Víctor García	Spain	8:35.87	
DQ	Nordine Gezzar	France	~~8:36.98~~	Doping
4	Abdelaziz Merzougui	Spain	8:38.58	
5	Łukasz Parszczyński	Poland	8:38.76	
6	Yuri Floriani	Italy	8:39.22	
7	Krystian Zalewski	Poland	8:39.35	
8	Hakan Duvar	Turkey	8:40.05	
9	Steffen Uliczka	Germany	8:41.53	
10	Ion Luchianov	Moldova	8:42.06	
11	Łukasz Oślizło	Poland	8:44.51	
12	Patrick Nasti	Italy	8:48.37	
13	Antonio David Jiménez	Spain	8:53.30	
14	Kaur Kivistik	Estonia	8:58.02	
