= 2018 European Athletics Championships – Men's 3000 metres steeplechase =

Olympic Stadium

Men's 3000 metres steeplechase at the 2018 European Athletics Championships
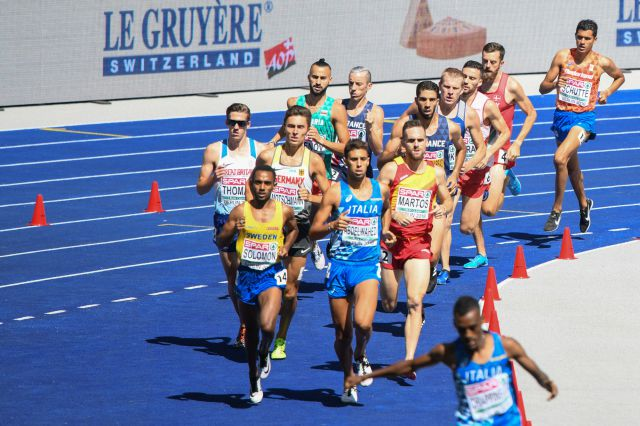
- A phase of heats.
- Venue: Olympic Stadium
- Location: Berlin
- Dates: August 7 (round 1); August 9 (final)
- Competitors: 29 from 18 nations
- Winning time: 8:31.66

Medalists
gold medal	Mahiedine Mekhissi-Benabbad	France
silver medal	Fernando Carro	Spain
bronze medal	Yohanes Chiappinelli	Italy

The Men's 3000 metres steeplechase at the 2018 European Athletics Championships took place at the Olympic Stadium on 7 and 9 August.

== Records ==
Standing records prior to the 2018 European Athletics Championships
World record	Saif Saaeed Shaheen (QAT)	7:53.63	Brussels, Belgium	3 September 2004
European record	Mahiedine Mekhissi-Benabbad (FRA)	8:00.09	Paris, France	6 July 2013
Championship record	Mahiedine Mekhissi-Benabbad (FRA)	8:07.87	Barcelona, Spain	1 August 2010
World Leading	Soufiane El Bakkali (MAR)	7:58.15	Monaco	20 July 2018
European Leading	Mahiedine Mekhissi-Benabbad (FRA)	8:16.97	Rome, Italy	31 May 2018

== Schedule ==
Date	Time	Round
7 August 2018	11:40	Round 1
9 August 2018	21:20	Final

All times are local times (UTC+2)

== Results ==
=== Round 1 ===
First 5 in each heat (Q) and the next fastest 5 (q) advance to the Final.

Rank	Heat	Name	Nationality	Time	Note
1	2	Yohanes Chiappinelli	Italy	8:28.41	Q
2	1	Topi Raitanen	Finland	8:28.48	Q, PB
3	2	Mahiedine Mekhissi-Benabbad	France	8:28.61	Q
4	2	Yoann Kowal	France	8:28.75	Q
5	2	Ahmed Abdelwahed	Italy	8:28.80	Q
6	2	Kaur Kivistik	Estonia	8:28.84	Q, NR
7	2	Napoleon Solomon	Sweden	8:29.10	q
8	1	Krystian Zalewski	Poland	8:29.11	Q
9	1	Daniel Arce	Spain	8:29.25	Q
10	1	Fernando Carro	Spain	8:29.63	Q
11	2	Sebastián Martos	Spain	8:29.67	q
12	1	Djilali Bedrani	France	8:29.75	Q
13	1	Tom Erling Kårbø	Norway	8:29.90	q
14	1	Zak Seddon	Great Britain	8:30.00	q
15	2	Ole Hesselbjerg	Denmark	8:30.44	q, SB
16	1	Jamaine Coleman	Great Britain	8:33.78	
17	1	Martin Grau	Germany	8:33.81	
18	2	Mitko Tsenov	Bulgaria	8:36.39	
19	1	Justinas Beržanskis	Lithuania	8:36.88	PB
20	2	Ieuan Thomas	Great Britain	8:40.87	
21	1	Osama Zoghlami	Italy	8:43.92	
22	1	Luca Sinn	Austria	8:44.80	PB
23	2	Noah Schutte	Netherlands	8:45.81	
24	2	Yervand Mkrtchyan	Armenia	8:50.35	PB
25	2	Ivo Balabanov	Bulgaria	8:51.52	PB
26	2	Johannes Motschmann	Germany	8:51.65	
27	2	André Pereira	Portugal	8:54.63	
	1	Tarık Langat Akdağ	Turkey	DNF	
	1	Emil Blomberg	Sweden	DNF	

=== Final ===
Rank	Name	Nationality	Time	Note
1st place, gold medalist(s)	Mahiedine Mekhissi-Benabbad	France	8:31.66	
2nd place, silver medalist(s)	Fernando Carro	Spain	8:34.16	
3rd place, bronze medalist(s)	Yohanes Chiappinelli	Italy	8:35.81	
4	Yoann Kowal	France	8:36.77	
5	Zak Seddon	Great Britain	8:37.28	
6	Daniel Arce	Spain	8:38.12	
7	Krystian Zalewski	Poland	8:38.59	
8	Topi Raitanen	Finland	8:40.11	
9	Kaur Kivistik	Estonia	8:40.32	
10	Djilali Bedrani	France	8:41.83	
11	Tom Erling Kårbø	Norway	8:42.91	
12	Napoleon Solomon	Sweden	8:43.66	
13	Ahmed Abdelwahed	Italy	8:44.77	
14	Sebastián Martos	Spain	8:46.76	
15	Ole Hesselbjerg	Denmark	8:48.48	
