= 2010 World Junior Championships in Athletics – Men's 3000 metres steeplechase =

The men's 3000 metres steeplechase event at the 2010 World Junior Championships in Athletics was held in Moncton, New Brunswick, Canada, at Moncton Stadium on 23 and 25 July.

== Medalists ==
Gold	Jonathan Ndiku; Kenya
Silver	Albert Kiptoo Yator; Kenya
Bronze	Jacob Araptany; Uganda

== Results ==
=== Final ===
25 July

Rank	Name	Nationality	Time	Notes
1st place, gold medalist(s)	Jonathan Ndiku	Kenya	8:23.48	
2nd place, silver medalist(s)	Albert Kiptoo Yator	Kenya	8:33.55	
3rd place, bronze medalist(s)	Jacob Araptany	Uganda	8:37.02	
4	Abdelaziz Merzougui	Spain	8:40.08	
5	Desta Alemu	Ethiopia	8:44.07	
6	François Marzetta	Italy	8:52.10	
7	Tanguy Pepiot	France	8:52.46	
8	Afewerk Mesfin	Ethiopia	8:54.84	
9	Romain Collenot-Spiret	France	8:56.40	
10	Jared Berman	United States	8:57.53	
11	Martin Grau	Germany	9:00.56	
12	Kosei Yamaguchi	Japan	9:00.87	

=== Heats ===
23 July

==== Heat 1 ====
Rank	Name	Nationality	Time	Notes
1	Albert Kiptoo Yator	Kenya	8:40.92	Q
2	Kosei Yamaguchi	Japan	8:49.74	Q
3	Abdelaziz Merzougui	Spain	8:53.96	Q
4	Romain Collenot-Spiret	France	8:54.50	Q
5	Martin Grau	Germany	8:55.15	q
6	Afewerk Mesfin	Ethiopia	8:55.77	q
7	Erwin Leysen	Belgium	8:55.96	
8	Isaac Kemboi Chelimo	Bahrain	9:00.38	
9	Mohamed Zeghba	Algeria	9:00.92	
10	Mattias Wolter	Canada	9:04.44	
11	Giuseppe Gerratana	Italy	9:06.62	
12	Taha Gourrida	Tunisia	9:10.66	
13	Il'gizar Safiulin	Russia	9:15.35	
14	Kaur Kivistik	Estonia	9:16.87	
15	Dakota Peachee	United States	9:27.68	

==== Heat 2 ====
Rank	Name	Nationality	Time	Notes
1	Jacob Araptany	Uganda	8:28.14	Q
2	Jonathan Ndiku	Kenya	8:28.23	Q
3	Desta Alemu	Ethiopia	8:38.04	Q
4	Tanguy Pepiot	France	8:49.38	Q
5	François Marzetta	Italy	8:51.43	q
6	Jared Berman	United States	8:55.33	q
7	Emin Tan	Turkey	8:56.86	
8	Matthew Graham	United Kingdom	9:09.36	
9	Daniel Arce	Spain	9:10.82	
10	Issam Bouchache	Algeria	9:11.34	
11	Ryan Cassidy	Canada	9:11.70	
12	Jonas Legernes	Sweden	9:13.23	
13	Stephan Abisch	Germany	9:18.75	
14	Emmet Jennings	Ireland	9:20.70	
15	Yuriy Kishchenko	Ukraine	9:32.95	

== Participation ==
According to an unofficial count, 30 athletes from 21 countries participated in the event.

- Algeria (2)
- Bahrain (1)
- Belgium (1)
- Canada (2)
- Estonia (1)
- Ethiopia (2)
- France (2)
- Germany (2)
- Ireland (1)
- Italy (2)
- Japan (1)
- Kenya (2)
- Russia (1)
- Spain (2)
- Sweden (1)
- Tunisia (1)
- Turkey (1)
- Uganda (1)
- Ukraine (1)
- United Kingdom (1)
- United States (2)
