= Fernando Carro (athlete) =

Spanish athlete (born 1992)

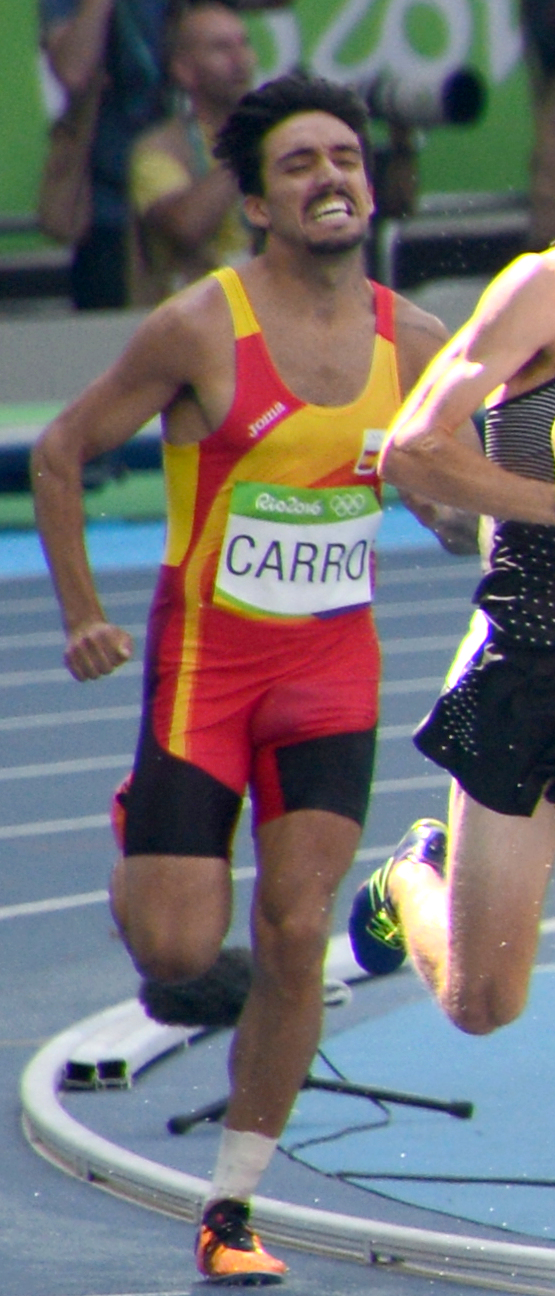
- Carro at the 2016 Olympics

Personal information
- Full name: Fernando Carro Morillo
- Nationality: Spanish
- Born: 1 April 1992 (age 34) Madrid, Spain
- Height: 1.75 m (5 ft 9 in)
- Weight: 67 kg (148 lb)

Sport
- Sport: Athletics
- Events: 3000 m, steeplechase
- Club: New Balance Team
- Coached by: Arturo Martín Tagarro

Achievements and titles
- Personal bests: 3000 m – 8:11.54 (2011); 3000 mS – 8:19.30 (2018)
Medal record
European Championships
Silver medal – second place	2018 Berlin	3000 m steeplechase
European Cross Country Championships
Gold medal – first place	2024 Antalya	Team race

Fernando Carro Morillo (born 1 April 1992) is a Spanish athlete specialising in the 3000 metres steeplechase. He represented his country at the 2015 World Championships in Beijing narrowly missing the final. In 2017, he competed in the men's 3000 metres steeplechase at the 2017 World Athletics Championships held in London, England.

== Competition record ==
Year	Competition	Venue	Position	Event	Notes
Representing Spain
2009	World Youth Championships	Brixen, Italy	20th (h)	3000 m	8:37.77
2009	European Youth Olympic Festival	Tampere, Finland	7th	3000 m	8:43.37
2011	European Junior Championships	Tallinn, Estonia	4th	3000 m s'chase	8:54.26
2013	European U23 Championships	Tampere, Finland	7th	3000 m s'chase	8:45.62
2014	Mediterranean U23 Championship	Aubagne, France	1st	3000 m s'chase	9:02.11
2014	Ibero-American Championships	São Paulo, Brazil	2nd	3000 m s'chase	8:39.66
2015	World Championships	Beijing, China	14th (h)	3000 m s'chase	8:38.05
2016	European Championships	Amsterdam, Netherlands	10th	3000 m s'chase	8:40.73
2016	Olympic Games	Rio de Janeiro, Brazil	40th (h)	3000 m s'chase	8:53.17
2017	World Cross Country Championships	Kampala, Uganda	61st	10 km XC	31:24
2017	World Championships	London, United Kingdom	33rd (h)	3000 m s'chase	8:38.42
2018	Mediterranean Games	Tarragona, Spain	5th	5000 m	13:57.26
2018	European Championships	Berlin, Germany	2nd	3000 m s'chase	8:34.16
2019	World Cross Country Championships	Aarhus, Denmark	41st	10 km XC	33:58
2019	World Championships	Doha, Qatar	11th	3000 m s'chase	8:12.31
2021	Olympic Games	Tokyo, Japan	–	3000 m s'chase	DNF
2024	World Cross Country Championships	Belgrade, Serbia	34th	10 km XC	29:51
2024	European Championships	Rome, Italy	–	3000 m s'chase	DNF
2026	European Championships	Birmingham, United Kingdom	44th	Marathon	2:21:14
