= Athletics at the 2015 Summer Universiade – Men's 3000 metres steeplechase =

The men's 3000 metres steeplechase event at the 2015 Summer Universiade was held on 9 July at the Gwangju Universiade Main Stadium.

== Results ==
Rank	Name	Nationality	Time	Notes
1st place, gold medalist(s)	Martin Grau	Germany	8:31.55	SB
2nd place, silver medalist(s)	Kaur Kivistik	Estonia	8:32.23	PB
3rd place, bronze medalist(s)	Yuriy Kloptsov	Russia	8:33.09	
4	Youssef Jaadi	Morocco	8:38.76	PB
5	Edwin Kibichiy	Kenya	8:39.54	
6	Patrick Nasti	Italy	8:42.04	
7	Justinas Beržanskis	Lithuania	8:43.34	SB
8	Ryan Brockerville	Canada	8:46.14	
9	Maksim Yakushev	Russia	8:47.60	
10	Tom Kaarboe	Norway	8:47.81	
11	Javier Quintana	Mexico	8:52.64	
12	Áron Dani	Hungary	8:55.98	SB
13	Kasper Skov	Denmark	9:00.39	PB
14	Christoph Sander	Austria	9:03.78	
15	Priit Aus	Estonia	9:03.83	
16	Harald Kaarboe	Norway	9:04.49	
17	Ayuob Al-Rashdi	Oman	9:47.24	
	Wang Yashuan	China	DNF	
