= Kaur Kivistik =

Estonian steeplechase runner

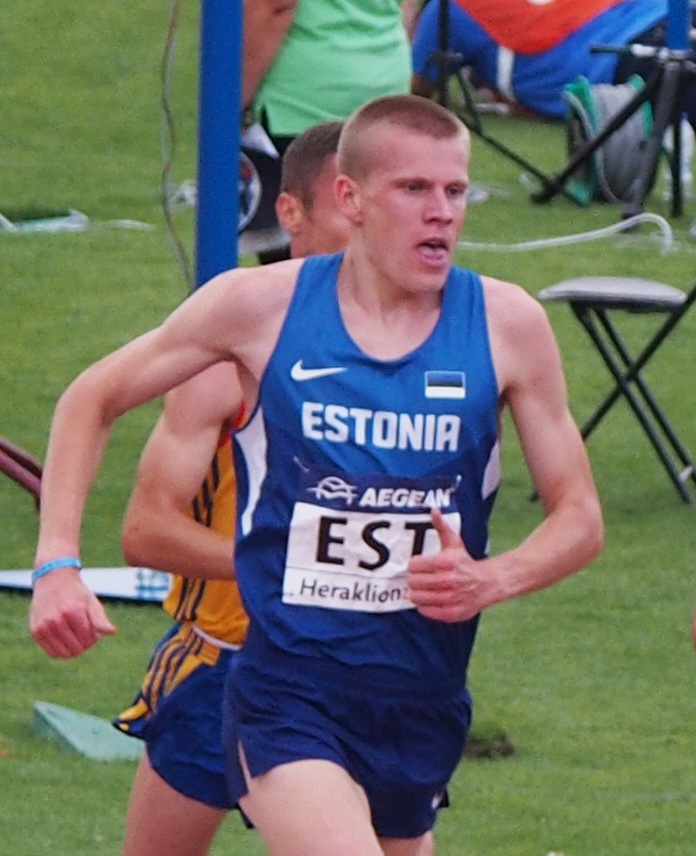
- Kaur Kivistik at 2015 European Team Championships First League.

Personal information
- Born: 29 April 1991 (age 35) Tartu, Estonia
- Height: 192 cm (6 ft 4 in)
- Weight: 76 kg (168 lb)

Sport
- Country: Estonia

Achievements and titles
- Personal best: 8:28.55 (2019)
Medal record
Men's athletics
Representing Estonia
Universiade
Silver medal – second place	2015 Gwangju	3000 m steeplechase
Representing Saaremaa
Island Games
Gold medal – first place	2023 Guernsey	10000 m
Gold medal – first place	2023 Guernsey	3000 m steeplechase

Kaur Kivistik (born 29 April 1991) is an Estonian athlete competing in the 3000 metres steeplechase. He won the silver medal at the 2015 Summer Universiade.

His personal best in the event is 8:28.55 set in Zagreb in 2019.

== Achievements ==
Year	Competition	Venue	Position	Event	Result
Representing Estonia
2010	World Junior Championships	Moncton, Canada	26th (h)	3000 m s'chase	9:16.87
2011	European U23 Championships	Tallinn, Estonia	13th (h)	3000 m s'chase	8:53.15
2012	European Championships	Helsinki, Finland	14th	3000 m s'chase	8:36.10 (h); 8:58.02 (f)
2013	European U23 Championships	Tampere, Finland	5th	3000 m s'chase	8:42.98
2015	Universiade	Gwangju, South Korea	2nd	3000 m s'chase	8:32.23
2015	World Championships	Beijing, China	34th (h)	3000 m s'chase	8:56.36
2016	European Championships	Amsterdam, Netherlands	7th	3000 m s'chase	8:33.75 (f)
2016	Olympic Games	Rio de Janeiro, Brazil	35th (h)	3000 m s'chase	8:44.25
2017	Universiade	Taipei, Taiwan	9th	3000 m s'chase	8:48.04
2018	European Championships	Berlin, Germany	9th	3000 m s'chase	8:28.84 (h) NR; 8:40.32 (f)
2019	World Championships	Doha, Qatar	39th (h)	3000 m s'chase	8:39.26
2022	European Championships	Munich, Germany	32nd	Marathon	2:17:51

== Personal bests ==
Outdoor

- 400 metres – 52.97 (Võru 2013)
- 800 metres – 1:51.69 (Ogre 2018)
- 1000 metres – 2:25.34 (Kohila 2010)
- 1500 metres – 3:43.83 (Tartu 2014)
- Mile – 4:08.6 (Tallinn 2015)
- 3000 metres – 8:09.99 (Rakvere 2014)
- 5000 metres – 14:00.97 (Azusa 2018)
- 3000 metres steeplechase – 8:28.55 (Zagreb 2019) NR
- Half marathon – 1:05:36 (Ostia 2012)

Indoor

- 800 metres – 2:01.62 (Tartu 2012)
- 1500 metres – 3:49.05 (Tartu 2014)
- 2000 metres – 5:34.78 (Tartu 2010)
- 3000 metres – 8:18.72 (Tallinn 2015)
