= 2013 European Athletics U23 Championships – Men's 3000 metres steeplechase =

The Men's 3000 metres steeplechase event at the 2013 European Athletics U23 Championships was held in Tampere, Finland, at Ratina Stadium on 12 and 14 July.

== Medalists ==
Gold	Abdelaziz Merzougui; Spain
Silver	Giuseppe Gerratana; Italy
Bronze	Tanguy Pepiot; France

== Results ==
=== Final ===
14 July 2013

Rank	Name	Nationality	Time	Notes
1st place, gold medalist(s)	Abdelaziz Merzougui	Spain	8:34.64	
2nd place, silver medalist(s)	Giuseppe Gerratana	Italy	8:35.55	PB
3rd place, bronze medalist(s)	Tanguy Pepiot	France	8:38.07	SB
4	Romain Collenot-Spriet	France	8:41.92	SB
5	Kaur Kivistik	Estonia	8:42.98	SB
6	Benjámin Szalai	Hungary	8:43.65	PB
7	Fernando Carro	Spain	8:45.62	
8	Djilali Bedrani	France	8:46.11	
9	Áron Dani	Hungary	8:46.20	PB
10	Adriano Engelhardt	Switzerland	8:46.88	PB
11	Jacek Żądło	Poland	9:01.78	
	Mitko Tsenov	Bulgaria	DQ	R 163.3b

Intermediate times:
1000m: 2:46.35 Fernando Carro Spain
2000m: 5:44.99 Fernando Carro Spain

=== Heats ===
Qualified: First 4 in each heat (Q) and 4 best performers (q) advance to the Final

==== Summary ====
Rank	Name	Nationality	Time	Notes
1	Mitko Tsenov	Bulgaria	8:45.02	Q
2	Giuseppe Gerratana	Italy	8:46.05	Q PB
3	Tanguy Pepiot	France	8:47.12	Q
4	Kaur Kivistik	Estonia	8:47.61	Q SB
5	Fernando Carro	Spain	8:47.62	q
6	Benjámin Szalai	Hungary	8:47.84	q PB
7	Adriano Engelhardt	Switzerland	8:51.91	q PB
8	Romain Collenot-Spriet	France	8:52.52	Q
9	Abdelaziz Merzougui	Spain	8:52.90	Q
10	Djilali Bedrani	France	8:54.74	q
11	Jacek Żądło	Poland	8:55.39	Q
12	Ioan Stefan Vasile	Romania	8:56.27	PB
13	Áron Dani	Hungary	8:57.00	Q PB
14	Martin Grau	Germany	8:57.83	
15	Maksim Yakushev	Russia	9:03.50	
16	Muhammet Emin Tan	Turkey	9:04.21	
17	Dawid Żebrowski	Poland	9:09.12	
18	Luca Sponza	Italy	9:10.37	
19	Emil Blomberg	Sweden	9:11.66	
20	Harald Kårbø	Norway	9:12.06	
	Vid Zevnik	Slovenia	DNF	

==== Details ====
===== Heat 1 =====
12 July 2013 / 13:05

Rank	Name	Nationality	Time	Notes
1	Mitko Tsenov	Bulgaria	8:45.02	Q
2	Giuseppe Gerratana	Italy	8:46.05	Q PB
3	Tanguy Pepiot	France	8:47.12	Q
4	Kaur Kivistik	Estonia	8:47.61	Q SB
5	Fernando Carro	Spain	8:47.62	q
6	Benjámin Szalai	Hungary	8:47.84	q PB
7	Adriano Engelhardt	Switzerland	8:51.91	q PB
8	Djilali Bedrani	France	8:54.74	q
9	Ioan Stefan Vasile	Romania	8:56.27	PB
10	Dawid Żebrowski	Poland	9:09.12	

Intermediate times:
1000m: 2:59.32 Adriano Engelhardt Switzerland
2000m: 5:58.12 Adriano Engelhardt Switzerland

===== Heat 2 =====
12 July 2013 / 13:20

Rank	Name	Nationality	Time	Notes
1	Romain Collenot-Spriet	France	8:52.52	Q
2	Abdelaziz Merzougui	Spain	8:52.90	Q
3	Jacek Żądło	Poland	8:55.39	Q
4	Áron Dani	Hungary	8:57.00	Q PB
5	Martin Grau	Germany	8:57.83	
6	Maksim Yakushev	Russia	9:03.50	
7	Muhammet Emin Tan	Turkey	9:04.21	
8	Luca Sponza	Italy	9:10.37	
9	Emil Blomberg	Sweden	9:11.66	
10	Harald Kårbø	Norway	9:12.06	
	Vid Zevnik	Slovenia	DNF	

Intermediate times:
1000m: 3:00.74 Maksim Yakushev Russia
2000m: 6:01.08 Martin Grau Germany

== Participation ==
According to an unofficial count, 21 athletes from 15 countries participated in the event.

- Bulgaria (1)
- Estonia (1)
- France (3)
- Germany (1)
- Hungary (2)
- Italy (2)
- Norway (1)
- Poland (2)
- Romania (1)
- Russia (1)
- Slovenia (1)
- Spain (2)
- Sweden (1)
- Switzerland (1)
- Turkey (1)
