= Justinas Beržanskis =

Lithuanian steeplechase runner (born 1989)

Justinas Beržanskis (born 12 January 1989) is a Lithuanian steeplechase runner.

He finished eighth at the 2013 Summer Universiade, seventh at the 2015 Summer Universiade and tenth at the 2017 Summer Universiade. He competed at the 2009 European U23 Championships (1500 metres), 2014 European Championships and the 2018 European Championships without reaching the final.

His personal best time is 8:36.88 minutes, achieved at the 2018 European Championships in Berlin.
