= Emil Blomberg =

Swedish runner (born 1992)

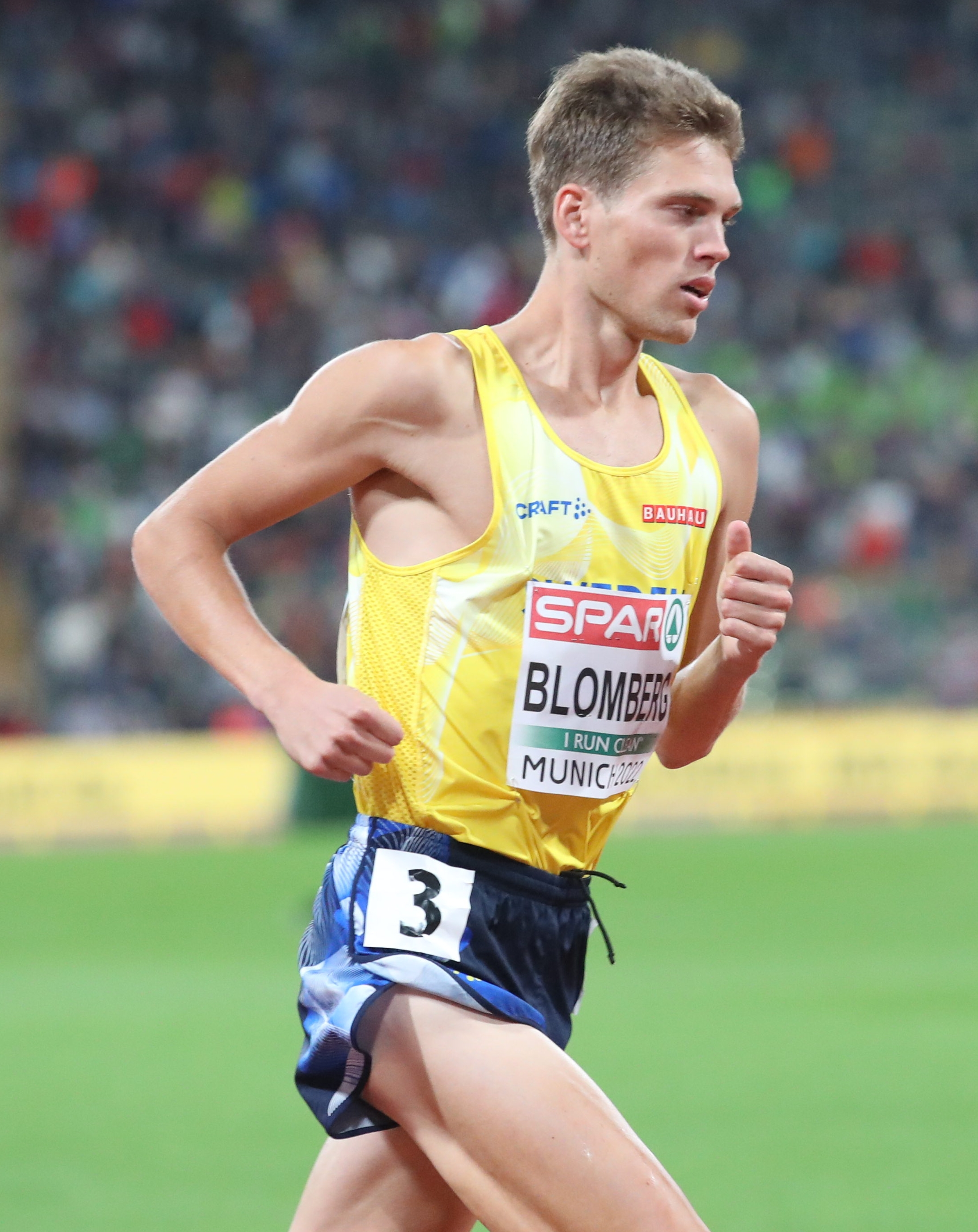
- Emil Blomberg in 2022

Personal information
- Born: 9 April 1992 (age 34) Järfälla, Sweden
- Education: University of Texas at Arlington
- Height: 1.89 m (6 ft 2 in)
- Weight: 73 kg (161 lb)

Sport
- Sport: Athletics
- Event: 3000 m steeplechase
- College team: UT Arlington Mavericks
- Club: Hässelby SK
Medal record
Men's athletics
Representing Sweden
European Games
Silver medal – second place	2023 Kraków-Małopolska	3000 m steeplechase

Emil Blomberg (born 9 April 1992) is a Swedish runner specialising in the 3000 metres steeplechase. He represented his country at the 2017 World Championships without finishing his heat. He also represented his country at the Olympic Games in Tokyo.

== International competitions ==
Year	Competition	Venue	Position	Event	Notes
Representing Sweden
2011	European Junior Championships	Tallinn, Estonia	11th (h)	3000 m s'chase	9:12.92^{1}
2013	European U23 Championships	Tampere, Finland	19th (h)	3000 m s'chase	9:11.66
2016	European Championships	Amsterdam, Netherlands	13th	3000 m s'chase	8:48.98
2017	World Championships	London, United Kingdom	–	3000 m s'chase	DNF
2018	European Championships	Berlin, Germany	–	3000 m s'chase	DNF
2021	Olympic Games	Tokyo, Japan	38th (h)	3000 m s'chase	8:39.57
2022	European Championships	Munich, Germany	10th	3000 m s'chase	8:33.09
2023	World Championships	Budapest, Hungary	36th (h)	3000 m s'chase	8:42.33
2024	European Championships	Rome, Italy	11th	3000 m s'chase	8:22.92

^{1}Did not finish in the final

== Personal bests ==
Outdoor

- 800 metres – 1:53.66 (Sollentuna 2016)
- 1500 metres – 3:42.48 (Huddinge 2020)
- 3000 metres – 8:00.81 (Hallsberg 2020)
- 5000 metres – 13:45.87 (Palo Alto 2023)
- 3000 metres steeplechase – 8:20.01 (Turku 2023)

Indoor

- 800 metres – 1:51.04 (Birmingham 2015)
- 1500 metres – 3:50.15 (Sätra 2018)
- One mile – 4:07.33 (Lincoln 2015)
- 3000 metres – 8:12.31 (Birmingham 2014)
- 5000 metres – 14:45.80 (Birmingham 2014)
