= Mahiedine Mekhissi-Benabbad =

French middle-distance runner

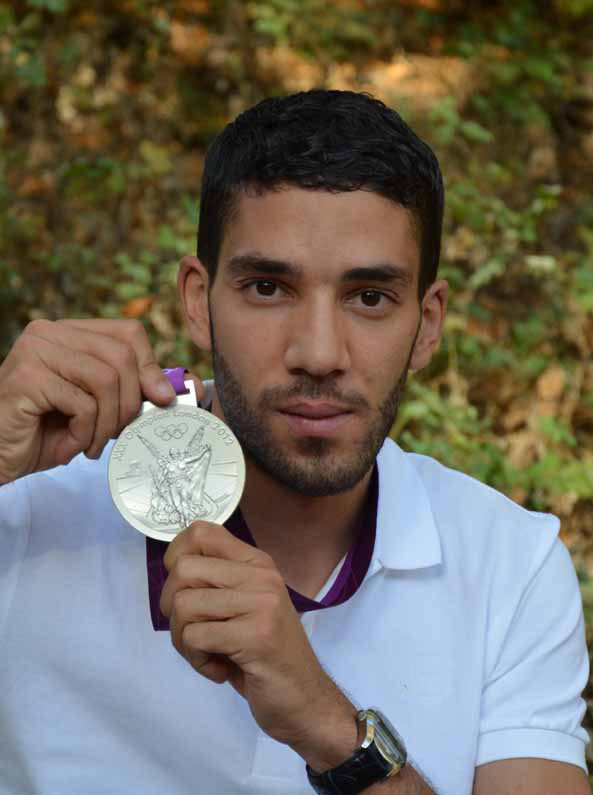
- Mekhissi-Benabbad in 2012

Personal information
- Born: 15 March 1985 (age 41) Reims, France
- Height: 1.90 m (6 ft 3 in)
- Weight: 75 kg (165 lb)

Sport
- Country: France
- Sport: Middle-distance running
- Events: 1000 metres, 1500 m, 3000 m, 2000 m steeplechase, 3000 m steeplechase
- Retired: 2023

Achievements and titles
- Personal bests: 1500 m: 3:33.12 (Tomblaine 2013); 2000 m steeplechase: 5:10.68 WB (Reims 2010); 3000 m steeplechase: 8:00.09 AR (Paris 2013)
Medal record
Men's athletics
Representing France
Olympic Games
Silver medal – second place	2008 Beijing	3000 m st.
Silver medal – second place	2012 London	3000 m st.
Bronze medal – third place	2016 Rio de Janeiro	3000 m st.
World Championships
Bronze medal – third place	2011 Daegu	3000 m st.
Bronze medal – third place	2013 Moscow	3000 m st.
European Championships
Gold medal – first place	2010 Barcelona	3000 m st.
Gold medal – first place	2012 Helsinki	3000 m st.
Gold medal – first place	2014 Zürich	1500 m
Gold medal – first place	2016 Amsterdam	3000 m st.
Gold medal – first place	2018 Berlin	3000 m st.
European Indoor Championships
Gold medal – first place	2013 Gothenburg	1500 m
Continental Cup
Bronze medal – third place	2010 Split	3000 m st.
European U23 Championships
Gold medal – first place	2007 Debrecen	3000 m st.

Mahiedine Mekhissi-Benabbad (born 15 March 1985) is a retired French professional middle-distance runner of Algerian descent who mainly competed in the 3000 metres steeplechase. He is the only man to win three Olympic steeplechase medals, claiming silver in 2008 and 2012 and bronze in 2016. He also won two bronze medals at the IAAF World Championships in Athletics in 2011 and 2013. Mekhissi-Benabbad earned titles at five consecutive editions of the European Athletics Championships between 2010 and 2018 (including one 1500 metres title).

He has gained notoriety for pushing the event's mascot after winning the 3000 m steeplechase finals at the 2010 and 2012 European Championships. Mekhissi-Benabbad is the European record holder for the 3000 m steeplechase, set in 2013, and also holds the world best in the 2000 m steeplechase, set in 2010.

== Running career ==
=== 2004-2007 ===
Mekhissi-Benabbad made his first appearances as a junior athlete in 2004, running at the 2004 IAAF World Cross Country Championships, where he was 61st in the junior race, and at the 2004 World Junior Championships where he was eliminated in the heats of the 3000 m steeplechase. He ran in the 1500 metres event at the 2006 European Cup, where he finished eighth. Mekhissi-Benabbad represented France at the 2006 IAAF World Cup, but only managed to finish eighth in the 1500 m event.

Mekhissi-Benabbad won the 3000 m steeplechase gold medal at the 2007 European Athletics U23 Championships. He competed in his first major senior event later that year – the 2007 World Championships - where he was eliminated in the heats of the 3000 m steeplechase competition.

=== 2008 ===
Mekhissi-Benabbad made significant progress in 2008, knocking seconds off his personal best at the 2008 Olympics to win the Olympic 3000 m steeplechase silver medal in a time of 8:10.49, only 15 hundredths of a second behind the gold medallist Brimin Kipruto. He became the first non-Kenyan in 24 years to finish first or second in the Olympic 3000 m steeplechase event. Coincidentally, the last non-Kenyan to do so was a Frenchman—Joseph Mahmoud—who won the silver medal at the 1984 Olympics in Los Angeles. Mekhissi-Benabbad improved further at the 2008 Weltklasse Zürich meeting, finishing behind Paul Kipsiele Koech in second place in a personal best time of 8:08.95, making him the fourth fastest 3000 m steeplechaser that year.

=== 2009 ===
Mekhissi-Benabbad opened the 2009 season with an appearance in the 3000 metres event at the Qatar Athletic Super Grand Prix, where he registered a personal best of 7:53.50. Another personal best came in the 3000 m steeplechase at the FBK Games in Hengelo, again behind Brimin Kipruto, as he took second place in 8:06:98. Mekhissi-Benabbad secured a prominent 2009 IAAF Golden League race victory at the Meeting Areva in Paris with a time of 8:13.23. He was selected to represent France at the 2009 World Championships in Berlin, where he was seen as a possible medallist in the 3000 m steeplechase. But he failed to complete his heat in that event when he was forced to step off the track injured with just over a lap to go.

=== 2010 ===
Mekhissi-Benabbad took part in the 2010 World Indoor Championships, his first major indoor competition, where he reached the final of the 1500 m and finished in eighth position with a time of 3:45.22. During the outdoor season of 2010, he scored a steeplechase win in 8:08.82 over Ezekiel Kemboi and Richard Mateelong at the Meeting International Mohammed VI d'Athlétisme de Rabat. Competing in the Reims leg of the French Alma Athlé Tour on 30 June, he broke Bouabdellah Tahri's newly established world best of 5:13.47 (set only 5 days earlier on 25 June) in the 2000 m steeplechase. Mekhissi-Benabbad's new world best of 5:10.68 was almost 4 seconds faster than the mark of 5:14.43 set on 21 August 1990 by Julius Kariuki, the Kenyan who would hold the 2000 m steeplechase world best for almost 20 years until it was broken by Tahri.

=== 2012 ===
Mekhissi-Benabbad won his second consecutive 3000 m steeplechase Olympic silver medal at the 2012 Olympics in London. In the final, with 200 m in the race remaining, Ezekiel Kemboi was in the lead, followed by Abel Kiprop Mutai in second place, Roba Gari in third place and Mekhissi-Benabbad in fourth place. Mekhissi-Benabbad then swept past both Gari and Mutai to finish second behind Kemboi. "I want to congratulate Ezekiel Kemboi because he won and it is not by chance because he won in 2004. ... He is stronger than me, but I do hope one day I can beat him," Mekhissi-Benabbad said right after the race. Right after the race, Kemboi did the victory dance he had become known for. He and Mekhissi-Benabbad exchanged jerseys and the diminutive Kemboi leaped into the much larger Mekhissi-Benabbad's arms.

=== 2013 ===
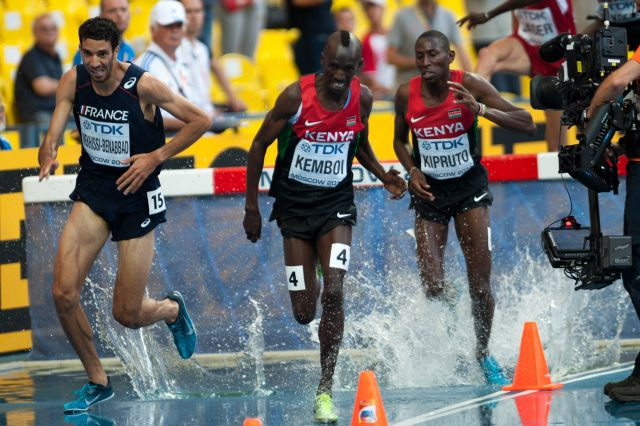
Mekhissi-Benabbad (far left) at the 2013 World Championships in Moscow

On 6 July 2013, Mekhissi-Benabbad set a new 3000 m steeplechase European record of 8:00.09 in the race at the Meeting Areva held in the Stade de France. He beat the previous European record of 8:01.18 set in Berlin at the 2009 World Championships by his compatriot Bouabdellah Tahri. Mekhissi-Benabbad finished second in that Meeting Areva 3000 m steeplechase race, which was won by Ezekiel Kemboi in the world's best time of the year (7:59.03).

Mekhissi-Benabbad won his second consecutive 3000 m steeplechase World Championships bronze medal at the 2013 World Championships in Moscow. With about 300 metres to go in the final, he passed Ezekiel Kemboi, then Paul Kipsiele Koech and became jointly in the lead with Conseslus Kipruto. Just after clearing the third-last hurdle in the final bend, Kemboi saw his chance and surged forward to pass both Mekhissi-Benabbad and Kipruto. From then on, Kemboi never relinquished his lead. Kipruto overtook Mekhissi-Benabbad at the start of the final straight and eventually finished second behind Kemboi. Right after the race, Mekhissi-Benabbad admitted that he was finding it hard to cope with the pressure. "In the French team I am under a lot of stress and pressure, but I have to deal with it the best I can. ... I had to settle for bronze again but it is never easy to win one. I am on the podium and that is what counts."

=== 2014 ===
At the 2014 European Athletics Championships in Zürich, Mekhissi-Benabbad was disqualified after finishing first in the final of 3000 m steeplechase. The action was taken after he removed his shirt on the home stretch of the final lap in an act of celebration, and the Spanish team lodged an official protest for "unsporting behaviour". The 3000 m steeplechase gold medal was awarded to fellow French athlete Yoann Kowal, who had finished second in that race. Mekhissi-Benabbad would win the 1500m title three days later.

=== 2015 ===
In early April 2015, Mekhissi-Benabbad underwent an operation on his right foot, which had been causing him pain, in a hospital in Qatar. As he needed several months to recover from his operation, he was forced to miss the 2015 summer athletics season, including the 2015 World Championships in Beijing.

=== 2016 ===
Mekhissi-Benabbad won the bronze medal in the 2016 Rio Olympic 3000 m steeplechase final. Having crossed the line in fourth place, he controversially filed a complaint against Ezekiel Kemboi who had finished third. Kemboi was judged to have committed a lane violation, resulting in his disqualification.

== Mascot abuse incidents ==
After winning the 3000 meter steeplechase final at the 2010 European Championships in Barcelona, Mekhissi-Benabbad asked a mascot to kneel in front of him before he pushed it to the ground.

On 1 July 2012, the Finnish newspaper Karjalainen reported an incident involving Mekhissi-Benabbad at the 2012 European Championships in Helsinki. After winning the 3000 m steeplechase final, Mekhissi-Benabbad walked over to the championship's mascot “Appy”, which was being worn by a 14-year-old girl, smacked a gift bag out of her hands and pushed her with both hands. He was not fined and did not apologize regarding the incident.

== Fight with Mehdi Baala ==
On 22 July 2011, immediately after the 1500 m race of the Monaco meeting of the IAAF Diamond League, Mekhissi-Benabbad and his fellow competitor and compatriot Mehdi Baala traded blows on the track. The French Athletics Federation handed Mekhissi-Benabbad and Baala a suspension of 10 months each—5 months suspended—from all European Athletics and IAAF track meets. Both were each fined 1500 euros and ordered to perform 50 hours of community service. Mekhissi-Benabbad and Baala were nevertheless cleared to take part in the upcoming 2011 World Championships.

== Personal bests ==
Event	Time (sec)	Venue	Date	Notes
1000 metres	2:17.14	Tomblaine, France	26 June 2009	
1500 metres	3:33.12	Tomblaine, France	2 July 2013	
2000 metres steeplechase	5:10.68 WB	Reims, France	30 June 2010	World best
3000 metres	7:44.98	Hengelo, Netherlands	30 May 2010	
3000 metres steeplechase	8:00.09	Paris, France	6 July 2013	European record

- All information taken from World Athletics profile.

== Results in international competitions ==
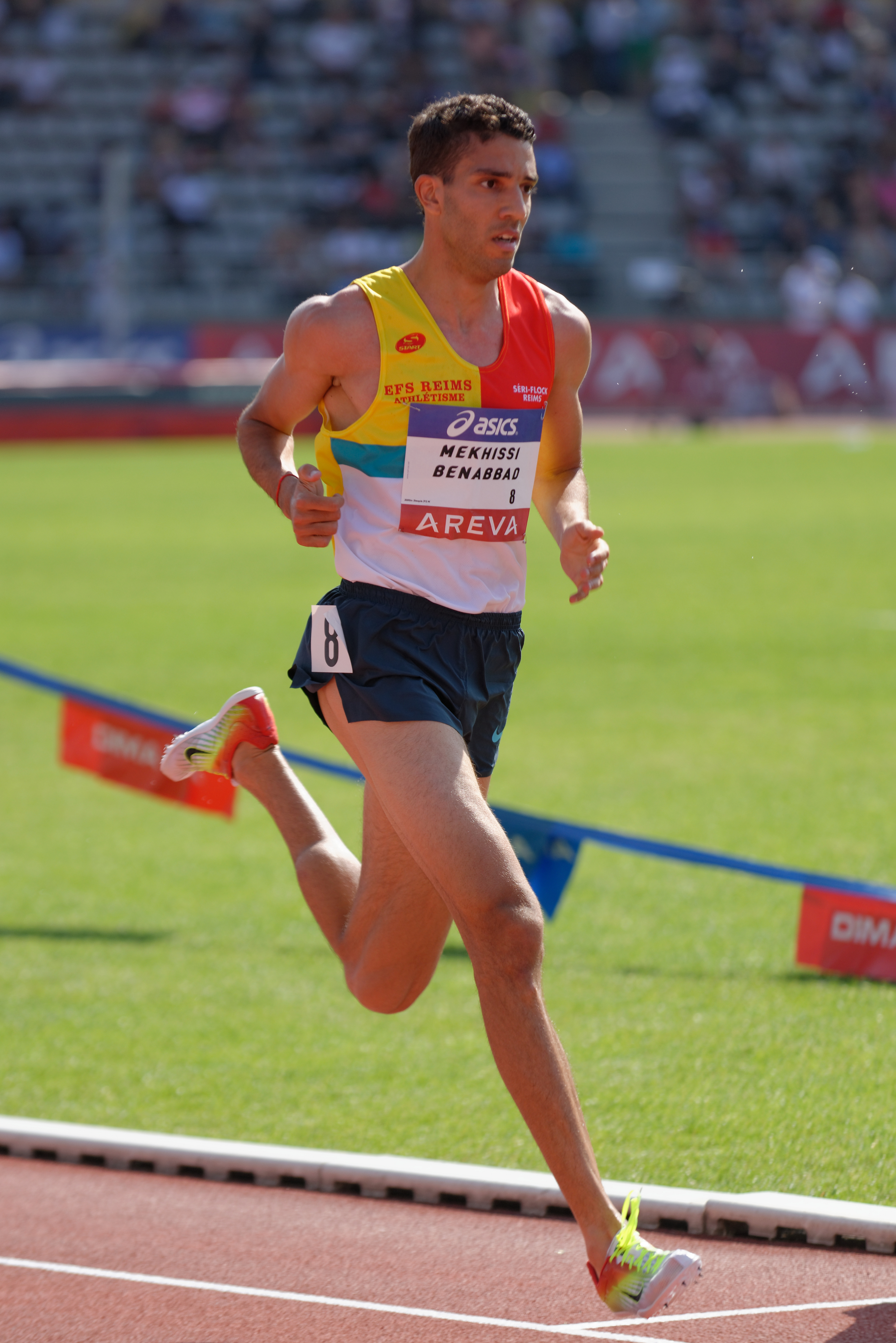
Mekhissi-Benabbad at the 2013 French Athletics Championships in Paris

Representing France
Year	Competition	Venue	Position	Event	Notes
2004	World Cross Country Championships	Brussels, Belgium	61st	Junior race	27:08
2004	World Junior Championships	Grosseto, Italy	29th (h)	3000 m steeple	9:09.53
2005	European U23 Championships	Erfurt, Germany	13th (h)	3000 m steeple	8:49.95
2006	European Cup	Málaga, Spain	8th	1500 m	
2006	IAAF World Cup	Athens, Greece	8th	1500 m	3:55.89
2007	European U23 Championships	Debrecen, Hungary	1st	3000 m steeple	8:33.91
2007	World Championships	Osaka, Japan	22nd (h)	3000 m steeple	8:33.11
2008	Olympic Games	Beijing, China	2nd	3000 m steeple	8:10.49
2008	DécaNation	Paris, France	1st	3000 m steeple	8:53.71
2009	World Championships	Berlin, Germany	– (h)	3000 m steeple	DNF
2010	World Indoor Championships	Doha, Qatar	8th	1500 m	3:45.22
2010	European Championships	Barcelona, Spain	1st	3000 m steeple	8:07.87
2010	IAAF Continental Cup	Split, Croatia	3rd	3000 m steeple	8:09.96
2010	DécaNation	Annecy, France	1st	3000 m steeple	8:27.27
2011	World Championships	Daegu, South Korea	3rd	3000 m steeple	8:16.09
2012	European Championships	Helsinki, Finland	1st	3000 m steeple	8:33.23
2012	Olympic Games	London, United Kingdom	2nd	3000 m steeple	8:19.08
2013	European Indoor Championships	Gothenburg, Sweden	1st	1500 m	3:37.17
2013	World Championships	Moscow, Russia	3rd	3000 m steeple	8:07.86
2014	European Championships	Zürich, Switzerland	1st	1500 m	3:45.60
2014	European Championships	Zürich, Switzerland	DQ	3000 m steeple	8:33.23
2016	European Championships	Amsterdam, Netherlands	1st	3000 m steeple	8:25.63
2016	Olympic Games	Rio de Janeiro, Brazil	3rd	3000 m steeple	8:11.52
2017	World Championships	London, United Kingdom	30th (h)	1500 m	3:46.17
2017	World Championships	London, United Kingdom	4th	3000 m steeple	8:15.80
2017	DécaNation	Angers, France	1st	2000 m	5:22.85
2018	European Championships	Berlin, Germany	1st	3000 m steeple	8:31.66
