= Abdelaziz Merzougui =

Spanish runner (born 1991)

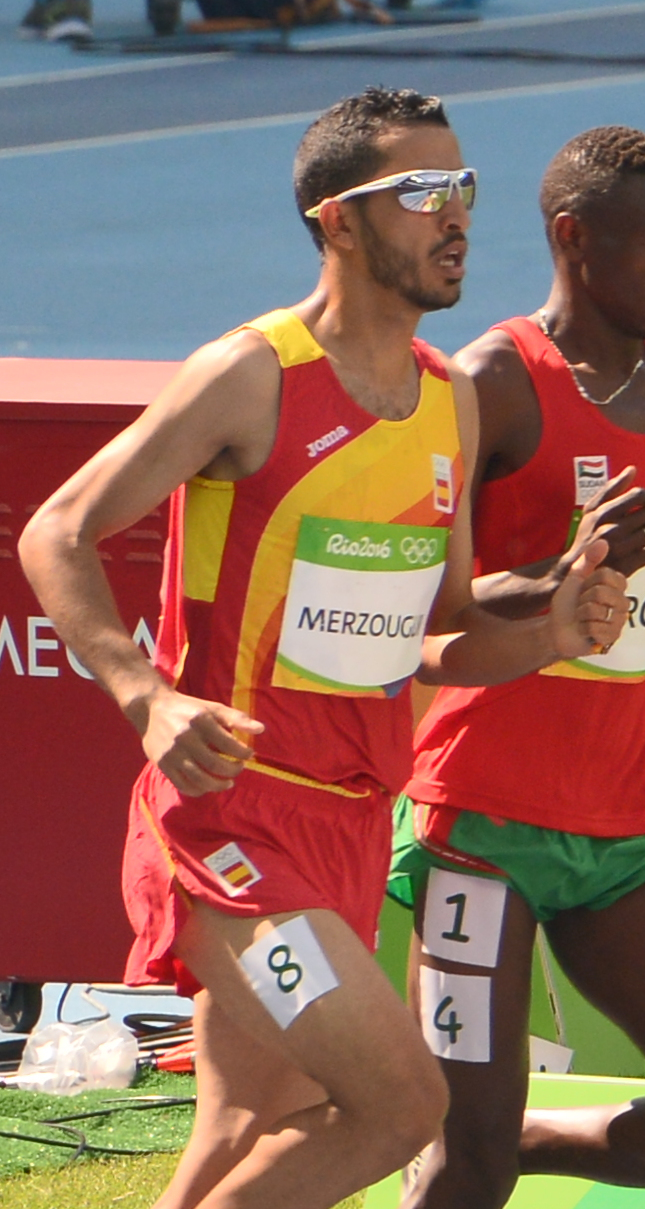
- Merzougui at the 2016 Olympics

Personal information
- Full name: Abdelaziz Merzougui Noureddine
- Nationality: Spanish
- Born: 30 August 1991 (age 34) Guelmim, Morocco
- Height: 175 cm (5 ft 9 in)
- Weight: 67 kg (148 lb)

Sport
- Sport: Athletics
- Events: 3000 m, steeplechase
- Club: Bikila
- Coached by: Antonio Canovas

Achievements and titles
- Personal bests: 3000 m – 8:33.43 (2007); 3000 mS – 8:18.03 (2012)

Abdelaziz Merzougui Noureddine (Note: In this Spanish name, the first or paternal surname is Merzougui and the second or maternal family name is Noureddine.) (born 30 August 1991) is a Spanish runner. He competed in the 3000 metres steeplechase at the 2012 and 2016 Olympics.

== Competition record ==
Year	Competition	Venue	Position	Event	Notes
Representing Spain
2010	World Junior Championships	Moncton, Canada	4th	3000 m s'chase	8:40.08
2011	European U23 Championships	Ostrava, Czech Republic	2nd	3000 m s'chase	8:36.21
2012	European Championships	Helsinki, Finland	4th	3000 m s'chase	8:38.58
2012	Olympic Games	London, United Kingdom	12th (h)	3000 m s'chase	8:58.20
2013	European U23 Championships	Tampere, Finland	1st	3000 m s'chase	8:34.64
2016	European Championships	Amsterdam, Netherlands	14th	3000 m s'chase	8:51.37
2016	Olympic Games	Rio de Janeiro, Brazil	15th (h)	3000 m s'chase	9:03.40
2022	European Championships	Munich, Germany	43rd	Marathon	2:19:47
