= Djilali Bedrani =

French steeplechase runner

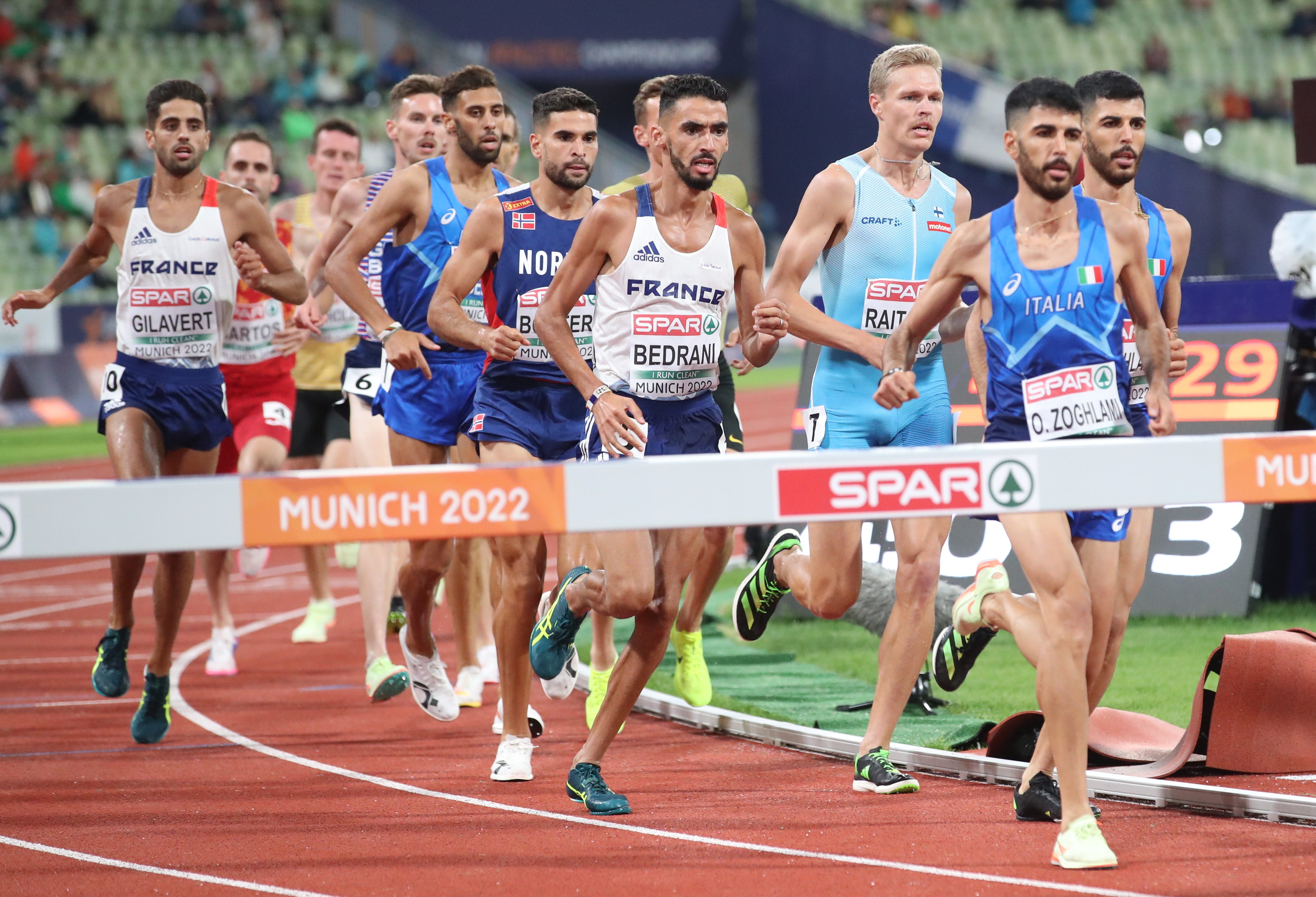
- Bedrani at the 2022 European Championships

Personal information
- Born: 1 October 1993 (age 33) Toulouse, France
- Height: 185 cm (6 ft 1 in)
- Weight: 59 kg (130 lb)

Sport
- Country: France
- Sport: Athletics
- Event: 3000 m steeplechase
- Club: SA Toulouse UC
- Coached by: Sébastien Gamel; Sophie Duarte
Medal record
Men's athletics
Representing France
European Championships
Silver medal – second place	2024 Rome	3000 m steeplechase

Djilali Bedrani (born 1 October 1993) is a French runner specialising in the 3000 metres steeplechase. He reached the final at the 2018 European Championships finishing tenth.

== International competitions ==
Year	Competition	Venue	Position	Event	Notes
Representing France
2012	World Junior Championships	Barcelona, Spain	14th (h)	3000 m s'chase	8:56.98
2013	European U23 Championships	Tampere, Finland	8th	3000 m s'chase	8:46.11
2014	Mediterranean U23 Championships	Aubagne, France	5th	3000 m s'chase	9:09.08
2015	European U23 Championships	Tallinn, Estonia	8th	3000 m s'chase	8:50.99
2016	European Championships	Amsterdam, Netherlands	22nd (h)	3000 m s'chase	8:57.27
2018	European Championships	Berlin, Germany	10th	3000 m s'chase	8:41.83
2019	European Indoor Championships	Glasgow, United Kingdom	4th	3000 m	7:58.40
2019	World Championships	Doha, Qatar	5th	3000 m s'chase	8:05.23
2021	European Indoor Championships	Toruń, Poland	17th (h)	3000 m	7:55.76
2021	Olympic Games	Tokyo, Japan	20th (h)	3000 m s'chase	8:20.23
2022	European Championships	Munich, Germany	8th	3000 m s'chase	8:28.52
2023	World Championships	Budapest, Hungary	13th (h)	3000 m s'chase	8:20.69
2024	European Championships	Rome, Italy	2nd	3000 m s'chase	8:14.36

== Personal bests ==
Outdoor

- 800 metres – 1:52.02 (Nantes 2019)
- 1000 metres – 2:33.69 (Périgueux 2010)
- 1500 metres – 3:36.41 (Decines 2024)
- 5000 metres – 14:21.18 (Talence 2014)
- 10 kilometres – 29:08 (Houilles 2018)
- 3000 metres steeplechase – 8:05.23 (Doha 2019)

Indoor

- 800 metres – 1:52.02 (Nantes 2019)
- 1500 metres – 3:40.27 (Miramas 2021)
- 3000 metres – 7:41.40 (Liévin 2020)
