= Krystian Zalewski =

Polish steeplechase runner

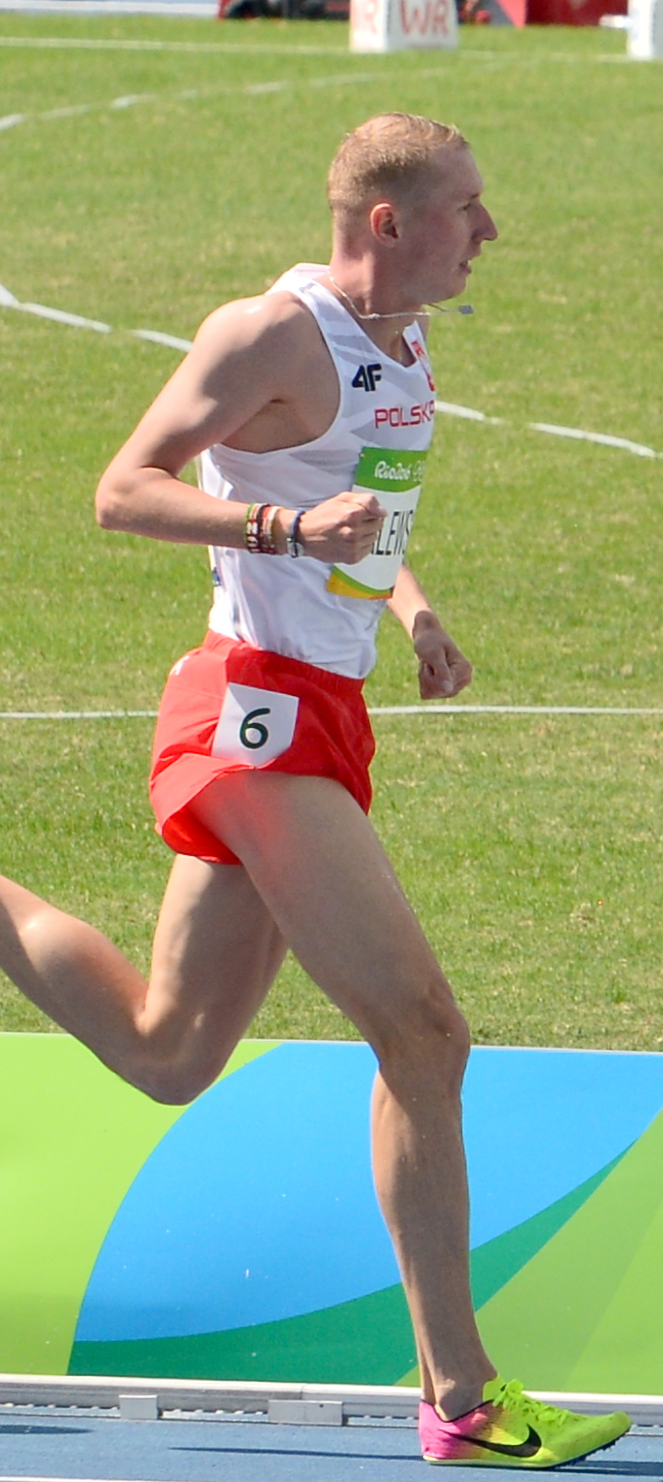
- Zalewski at the 2016 Olympics

Personal information
- Nationality: Polish
- Born: 11 April 1989 (age 37) Drawsko Pomorskie, Poland
- Education: University of Szczecin
- Height: 185 cm (6 ft 1 in)
- Weight: 68 kg (150 lb)

Sport
- Sport: Athletics
- Events: 3000 m steeplechase, 1500–5000 m
- Club: UKS Barmin
- Coached by: Jacek Kostrzeba

Achievements and titles
- Personal bests: 1500 m – 3:44.02 (2010); 3000 m – 7:59.67 (2014); 3000 mS – 8:16.20 (2014); 5000 m – 14:13.44 (2012)
Medal record
Representing Poland
European Championships
Silver medal – second place	2014 Zürich	3000 m steeplechase
European Team Championships
Gold medal – first place	2015 Cheboksary	3000 m steeplechase
Bronze medal – third place	2019 Bydgoszcz	3000 m steeplechase
European U23 Championships
Bronze medal – third place	2011 Ostrava	3000 m steeplechase
Universiade
Gold medal – first place	2017 Taipei	3000 m steeplechase

Krystian Zalewski (Polish pronunciation: [ˈkrɨstjan zaˈlɛfskʲi]; born 11 April 1989) is a Polish distance runner specialising in the 3000 metres steeplechase. He won the silver medal at the 2014 European Championships. Additionally, he represented his country at three consecutive World Championships, reaching the final in 2015. He also competed at the 2016 Summer Olympics without qualifying for the final.

== Competition record ==
Year	Competition	Venue	Position	Event	Notes
Representing Poland
2007	European Junior Championships	Hengelo, Netherlands	8th	3000 m s'chase	9:01.74
2008	World Junior Championships	Bydgoszcz, Poland	7th	3000 m s'chase	8:45.64
2009	European U23 Championships	Kaunas, Lithuania	3rd	3000 m s'chase	8:42.06
2011	European U23 Championships	Ostrava, Czech Republic	7th	3000 m s'chase	8:45.33
2012	European Championships	Helsinki, Finland	7th	3000 m s'chase	8:39.35
2013	World Championships	Moscow, Russia	–	3000 m s'chase	DQ
2014	European Championships	Zürich, Switzerland	2nd	3000 m s'chase	8:27.11
2015	World Championships	Beijing, China	9th	3000 m s'chase	8:21.22
2016	European Championships	Amsterdam, Netherlands	2nd (h)	3000 m s'chase	8:31.50^{1}
2016	Olympic Games	Rio de Janeiro, Brazil	27th (h)	3000 m s'chase	8:34.52
2017	World Championships	London, United Kingdom	19th (h)	3000 m s'chase	8:28.41
2017	Universiade	Taipei, Taiwan	1st	3000 m s'chase	8:35.88
2018	European Championships	Berlin, Germany	7th	3000 m s'chase	8:38.59
2019	World Championships	Doha, Qatar	43rd (h)	3000 m s'chase	8:51.79

^{1}Did not start in the final

== Personal bests ==
Outdoor

- 1000 metres – 2:22.62 (Police 2012)
- 1500 metres – 3:44.02 (Białogard 2010)
- One mile – 4:08.55 (Międzyzdroje 2008)
- 3000 metres – 7:58.38 (Dessau 2016)
- 5000 metres – 13:45.94 (Białogard 2015)
- 5 kilometres – 13:53 (Monaco 2019)
- 10,000 metres – 28:39.95 (Białogard 2019)
- 10 kilometres – 30:06 (Warsaw 2018)
- Half marathon – 1:02:34 (Gdynia 2019)
- 3000 metres steeplechase – 8:16.20 (Rome 2014)

Indoor

- 1500 metres – 3:48.32 (Toruń 2016)
- 3000 metres – 8:13.43 (Mondeville 2014)
