= 2009 European Athletics U23 Championships – Men's 3000 metres steeplechase =

The men's 3000 metres steeplechase event at the 2009 European Athletics U23 Championships was held in Kaunas, Lithuania, at S. Dariaus ir S. Girėno stadionas (Darius and Girėnas Stadium) on 17 and 19 July.

== Medalists ==
Gold	Aleksandr Pavelyev; Russia
Silver	José Luis Galván; Spain
Bronze	Krystian Zalewski; Poland

== Results ==
=== Final ===
19 July

Rank	Name	Nationality	Time	Notes
1st place, gold medalist(s)	Aleksandr Pavelyev	Russia	8:40.55	
2nd place, silver medalist(s)	José Luis Galván	Spain	8:41.53	
3rd place, bronze medalist(s)	Krystian Zalewski	Poland	8:42.06	
4	Sebastián Martos	Spain	8:42.69	
5	Stephen Lisgo	United Kingdom	8:45.77	
6	Christian Steinhammer	Austria	8:56.21	
7	Alexandru Ghinea	Romania	8:56.84	
8	Eric Senorski	Sweden	8:58.17	
9	Osman Baş	Turkey	8:59.28	
10	Valentin Pfeil	Austria	8:59.34	
11	Łukasz Oślizło	Poland	9:09.13	
12	Konstantīns Savčuks	Latvia	9:24.14	

=== Heats ===
17 July
Qualified: first 4 each heat and 4 best to Final

==== Heat 1 ====
Rank	Name	Nationality	Time	Notes
1	Alexandru Ghinea	Romania	8:48.59	Q
2	Krystian Zalewski	Poland	8:48.69	Q
3	Sebastián Martos	Spain	8:49.02	Q
4	Aleksandr Pavelyev	Russia	8:50.73	Q
5	Christian Steinhammer	Austria	8:56.58	q
6	Eric Senorski	Sweden	8:57.21	q
7	Osman Baş	Turkey	8:57.39	q
8	Younes El Haddad	France	9:03.09	
9	Noam Ne'eman	Israel	9:05.73	
10	Tahar Semlali	France	9:11.75	

==== Heat 2 ====
Rank	Name	Nationality	Time	Notes
1	José Luis Galván	Spain	8:57.53	Q
2	Stephen Lisgo	United Kingdom	8:59.45	Q
3	Łukasz Oślizło	Poland	9:00.29	Q
4	Valentin Pfeil	Austria	9:00.93	Q
5	Konstantīns Savčuks	Latvia	9:01.80	q
6	Artur Olejarz	Poland	9:02.43	
7	Milan Kocourek	Czech Republic	9:04.12	
8	Sebastien Hours	France	9:05.99	
9	Sedat Günen	Turkey	9:12.70	
10	Andrej Jegorov	Lithuania	9:16.37	

== Participation ==
According to an unofficial count, 20 athletes from 13 countries participated in the event.

- Austria (2)
- Czech Republic (1)
- France (3)
- Israel (1)
- Latvia (1)
- Lithuania (1)
- Poland (3)
- Romania (1)
- Russia (1)
- Spain (2)
- Sweden (1)
- Turkey (2)
- United Kingdom (1)
