= Martin Grau =

German steeplechase runner

Martin Christian Grau
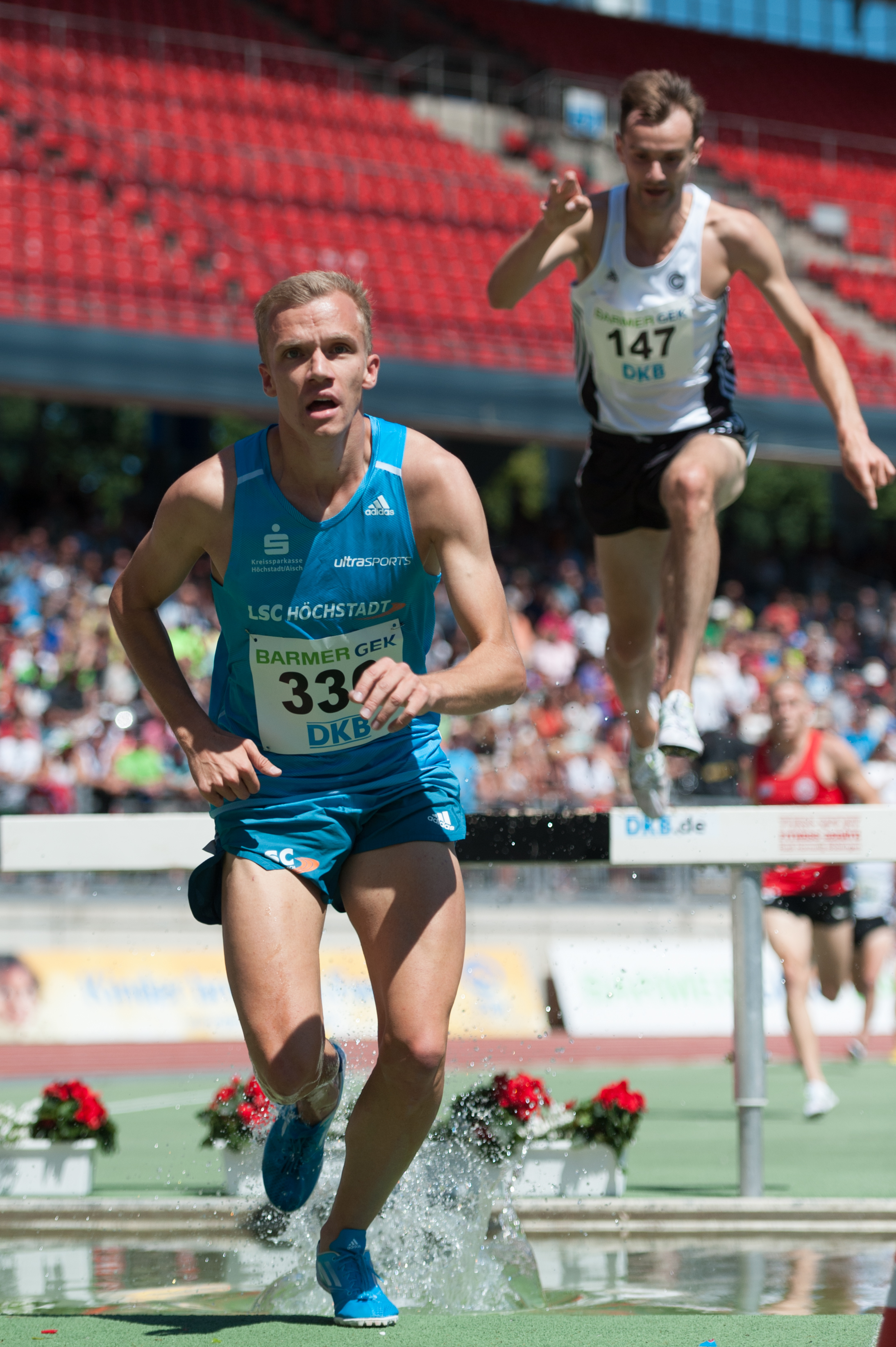
- Grau at the 2015 German Championships

Personal information
- Born: March 26, 1992 (age 34) Höchstadt
- Education: Ansbach University of Applied Sciences

Sport
- Country: Germany
- Sport: German Steeplechase athlete
Medal record
Representing Germany
European Athletics Junior Championships
Bronze medal – third place	2011 Tallinn	3000 m s'chase
Super League
Silver medal – second place	2014 Braunschweig	3000 m s'chase
Summer Universiade
Gold medal – first place	2015 Gwangju	3000 m s'chase

Martin Christian Grau (born 26 March 1992) is a German track and field athlete who specialises in the 3000 metres steeplechase. He holds a personal best of 8:24.29 minutes for the event, set in 2014. He was the gold medallist at the 2015 Summer Universiade.

== Career ==
Born in Höchstadt, Grau joined the local athletics club LSC Höchstadt/Aisch. His twin brother, Bastian Grau, also took up distance running. His international debut came at the age of eighteen, when he finished eleventh at the 2010 World Junior Championships in Athletics. He had his first international success at the 2011 European Athletics Junior Championships, where he was the steeplechase bronze medallist. He also ran in the junior race at the 2011 European Cross Country Championships that year, finishing 53rd.

Grau improved his steeplechase best to 8:47.43 minutes in 2012, then became the German under-23 champion in 2013. He ran at the 2013 European Athletics U23 Championships, but failed to make it to the final. After setting a personal best of 8:24.29 minutes in June 2014, he established himself as a senior athlete with a second-place finish behind France's Yoann Kowal at the 2014 European Team Championships Super League. At the 2014 German Athletics Championships he claimed the runner-up spot behind the more established Steffen Uliczka. He was selected to run for Germany at the 2014 European Athletics Championships, but finished only 13th in the final after having qualified as the second fastest athlete.

He returned to the European Team Championships in 2015, but managed only fourth on that occasion. The 2015 Universiade was the venue of his first international steeplechase title, where he beat all-comers in the student event with a run of 8:31.55 minutes.

== Personal bests ==
- 2000 metres steeplechase – 5:58.89 min (2009)
- 3000 metres steeplechase – 8:24.29 min (2014)

== International competitions ==
Year	Competition	Venue	Position	Event	Notes
2010	World Junior Championships	Moncton, Canada	11th	3000 m s'chase	9:00.56
2011	European Junior Championships	Tallinn, Estonia	3rd	3000 m s'chase	8:48.79
2011	European Cross Country Championships	Velenje, Slovenia	53rd	Junior race	
2013	European U23 Championships	Tampere, Finland	14th (h)	3000 m s'chase	8:57.83
2014	European Team Championships	Braunschweig, Germany	2nd	3000 m s'chase	8:29.16
2014	European Championships	Zürich, Switzerland	13th	3000 m s'chase	8:44.46
2015	European Team Championships	Cheboksary, Russia	4th	3000 m s'chase	8:42.58
2015	Universiade	Gwangju, South Korea	1st	3000 m s'chase	8:31.55
2017	Universiade	Taipei, Taiwan	7th	3000 m s'chase	8:45.63
2018	European Championships	Berlin, Germany	17th (h)	3000 m s'chase	8:33.81
2019	World Championships	Doha, Qatar	24th (h)	3000 m s'chase	8:26.79
