= Tom Erling Kårbø =

Norwegian steeplechase runner

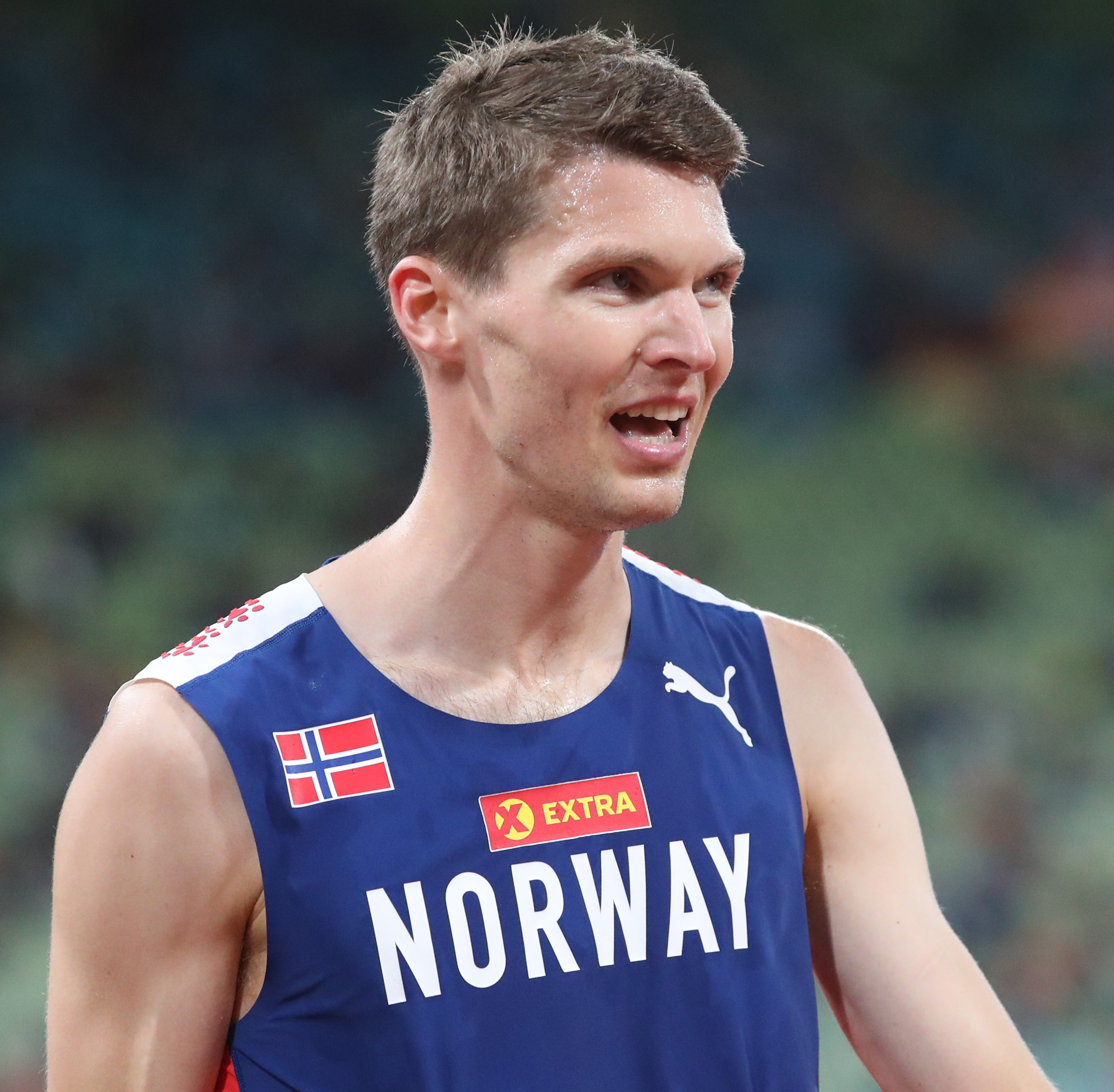
- Kårbø in Munich 2022

Personal information
- Born: 4 February 1989 (age 37) Haugesund, Norway
- Height: 1.87

Sport
- Sport: Athletics
- Event: 3000 m steeplechase
- Club: Stord IL

Tom Erling Kårbø (born 4 February 1989 in Haugesund) is a Norwegian runner specialising in the 3000 metres steeplechase. He made the final at the 2018 European Championships finishing 11th.

His younger brother, Harald Kårbø, is also a runner on national level.

== International competitions ==
Year	Competition	Venue	Position	Event	Notes
Representing Norway
2011	European U23 Championships	Ostrava, Czech Republic	8th	3000 m s'chase	8:46.96
2014	European Championships	Zürich, Switzerland	19th (h)	3000 m s'chase	8:42.33
2015	Universiade	Gwangju, South Korea	10th	3000 m s'chase	8:47.81
2016	European Championships	Amsterdam, Netherlands	16th (h)	3000 m s'chase	8:42.72
2018	European Championships	Berlin, Germany	11th	3000 m s'chase	8:42.91
2019	World Championships	Doha, Qatar	25th (h)	3000 m s'chase	8:27.01
2022	World Championships	Eugene, United States	23rd (h)	3000 m s'chase	8:26.12
2022	European Championships	Munich, Germany	12th	3000 m s'chase	8:33.57
2024	European Championships	Rome, Italy	25th (h)	3000 m s'chase	8:39.99

== Personal bests ==
Outdoor

- 800 metres – 1:52.82 (Oslo 2011)
- 1500 metres – 3:44.87 (Sollentuna 2018)
- 3000 metres – 8:02.49 (Bergen 2013)
- 5000 metres – 14:05.29 (Heusden-Zolder 2017)
- 10 kilometres – 29:34 (Lausanne 2015)
- 3000 metres steeplechase – 8:29.41 (Leiden 2018)

Indoor

- 800 metres – 1:56.02 (Haugesund 2017)
- 1500 metres – 3:48.91 (Uppsala 2018)
- One mile – 4:15.36 (Bemidji 2017)
- 3000 metres – 8:07.23 (Ghent 2013)
- 5000 metres – 15:00.47 (Mankato 2010)
