= Sebastián Martos =

Spanish steeplechase runner

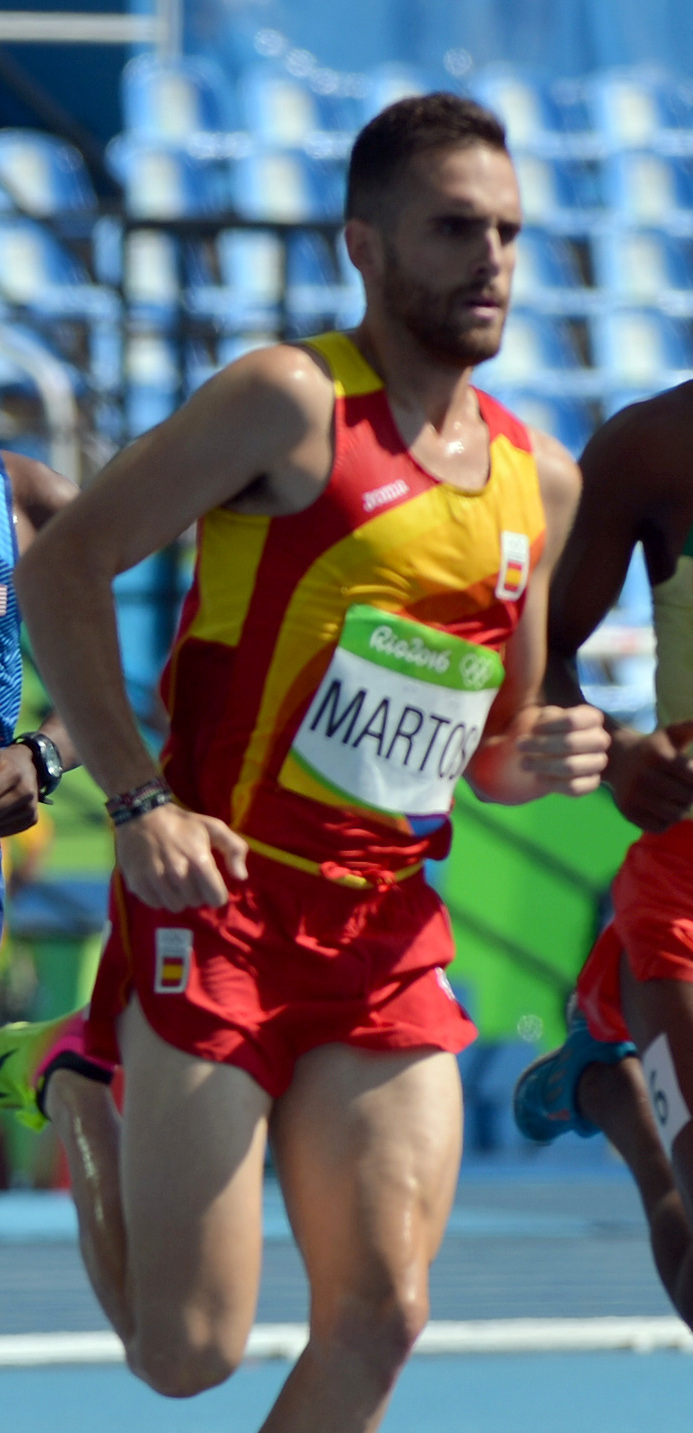
- Martos at the 2016 Olympics

Personal information
- Full name: Sebastián Martos Roa
- Nationality: Spanish
- Born: 20 June 1989 (age 37) Huelma, Jaén, Spain
- Education: University of León
- Height: 1.78 m (5 ft 10 in)
- Weight: 63 kg (139 lb)

Sport
- Sport: Athletics
- Event: 3000 m steeplechase
- Club: C.D. Nike Running
- Coached by: José Enrique Villacorta

Sebastián Martos Roa (born 20 June 1989) is a Spanish athlete specialising in the 3000 metres steeplechase. He represented his country at the 2013 and 2015 World Championships without qualifying for the final. In addition, he finished fourth at the 2014 European Championships and won the silver medal at the 2013 Summer Universiade. In 2017, he competed in the men's 3000 metres steeplechase at the 2017 World Athletics Championships held in London, United Kingdom.

== Competition record ==
Year	Competition	Venue	Position	Event	Notes
Representing Spain
2008	World Junior Championships	Bydgoszcz, Poland	13th (h)	3000 m s'chase	8:57.85
2009	European U23 Championships	Kaunas, Lithuania	4th	3000 m s'chase	8:42.69
2011	European U23 Championships	Ostrava, Czech Republic	1st	3000 m s'chase	8:35.35
2011	Universiade	Shenzhen, China	5th	3000 m s'chase	8:44.44
2013	Universiade	Kazan, Russia	2nd	3000 m s'chase	8:37.94
2013	World Championships	Moscow, Russia	25th (h)	3000 m s'chase	8:32.63
2014	European Championships	Zürich, Switzerland	4th	3000 m s'chase	8:30.08
2015	World Championships	Beijing, China	26th (h)	3000 m s'chase	8:50.20
2016	European Championships	Amsterdam, Netherlands	4th	3000 m s'chase	8:31.93
2016	Olympic Games	Rio de Janeiro, Brazil	17th (h)	3000 m s'chase	8:28.44
2017	World Championships	London, United Kingdom	42nd (h)	3000 m s'chase	8:51.57
2018	European Championships	Berlin, Germany	14th	3000 m s'chase	8:46.76
2021	Olympic Games	Tokyo, Japan	23rd (h)	3000 m s'chase	8:23.07
2022	World Championships	Eugene, United States	14th	3000 m s'chase	8:36.66
2022	European Championships	Munich, Germany	6th	3000 m s'chase	8:26.68

== Personal bests ==
Outdoor

- 1500 metres – 3:43.45 (Castellón 2011)
- 3000 metres steeplechase – 8:16.46 (La Nucia 2022)

Indoor

- 1500 metres – 3:44.11 (Madrid 2017)
- 3000 metres – 7:50.68 (Madrid 2022)
