= Abdoullah Bamoussa =

Italian-Moroccan steeplechase runner

Personal information
- Nationality: Italian
- Born: 8 June 1986 (age 40) Oulad Berhil
- Height: 1.70 m (5 ft 7 in)
- Weight: 59 kg (130 lb)

Sport
- Country: Italy
- Sport: Athletics
- Events: Middle-distance running 3000 metres steeplechase
- Club: Cus Palermo

Achievements and titles
- Personal best: 3000 m s'chase 8:22.00 (2017)

Abdoullah Bamoussa (born 8 June 1986) is an Italian born Moroccan steeplechase runner, 8th at the 2016 European Athletics Championships.

== Biography ==
He competed at the 2016 Summer Olympics in the men's 3000 metres steeplechase race; his time of 8:42.81 in the heats did not qualify him for the final.

== Personal best ==
- 3000 m steeplechase: 8:22.00 - (Italy) Rome, 8 June 2017 (Golden Gala)

== Achievements ==
Year	Competition	Venue	Position	Event	Measure	Notes
2016	European Championships	(Netherlands) Amsterdam	8th	3000 m steeplechase	8:35.35	
2016	Olympic Games	(Brazil) Rio de Janeiro	el. QF	3000 m steeplechase	8:42.81	
2017	World Championships	(United Kingdom) London	26th el. QF	3000 m steeplechase	8:34.86	

== See also ==
- Italy at the 2017 World Championships in Athletics
- Naturalized athletes of Italy
