= Yoann Kowal =

French middle-distance runner

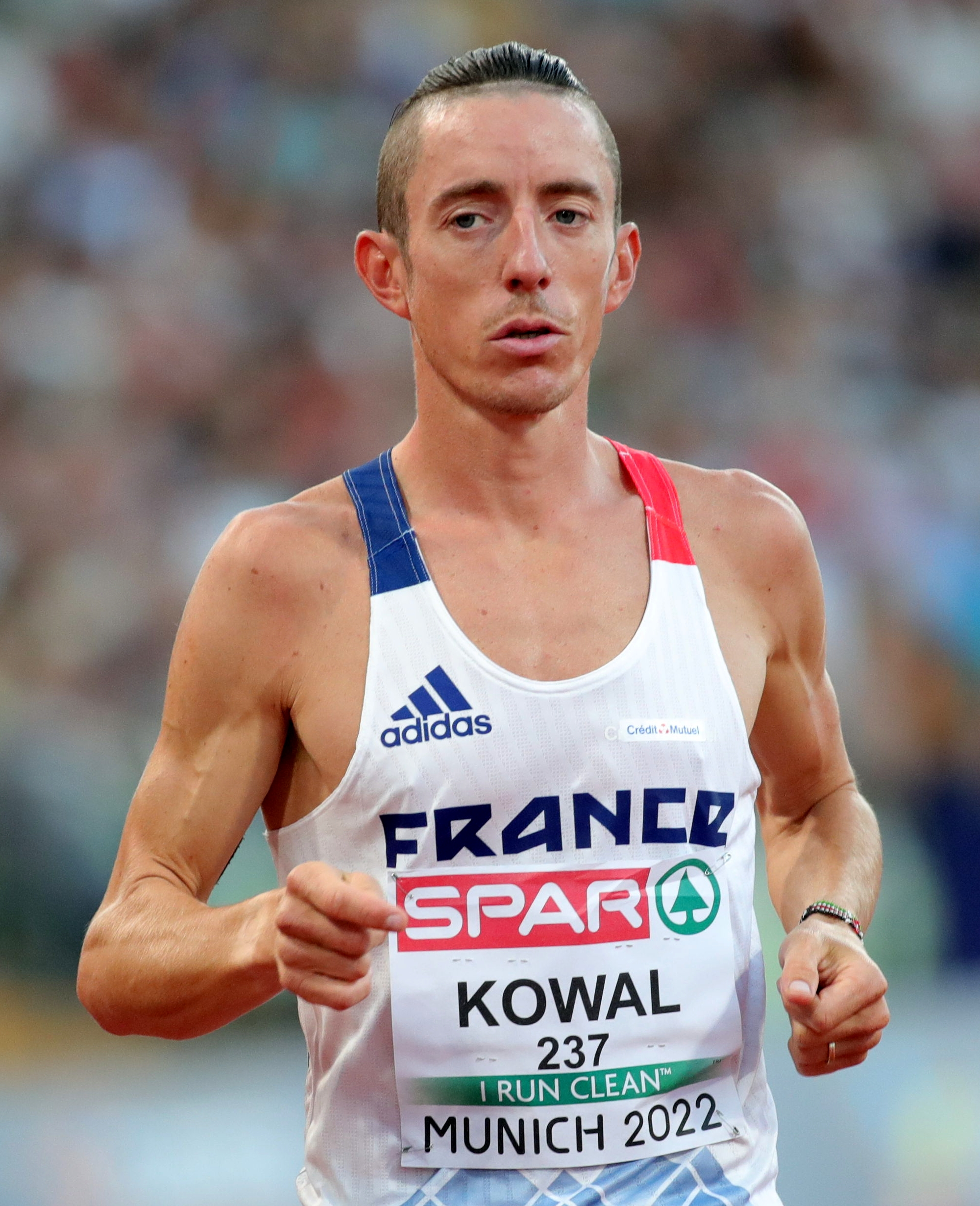
- Kowal at the 2022 European Championships in Munich

Personal information
- Born: 28 May 1987 (age 39) Nogent-le-Rotrou, France
- Height: 172 cm (5 ft 8 in)
- Weight: 58 kg (128 lb)

Sport
- Sport: Athletics
- Club: Entente Perigueux Sarlat Trelissac Athletisme
- Coached by: Patrick Petitbreuil
Medal record
Representing France
European Championships
| Gold medal – first place | 2014 Zürich | 3000 m steeplechase |
| Bronze medal – third place | 2016 Amsterdam | 3000 m steeplechase |
European Indoor Championships
| Bronze medal – third place | 2009 Torino | 1500 m |

Yoann Kowal (born 28 May 1987) is a French middle and long-distance runner. He formerly specialized in the 1500 metres and 3000 metres steeplechase before switching to longer races such as the 10,000 metres.

== Personal life ==
Kowal is married to Marianne and has a daughter Elea. His father Daniel held the national title in the 3000 m steeplechase, and his mother Nadine was a French duathlon champion. Kowal took up athletics aged four and started competing internationally in 2009. He frequently trains in Kenya. As of 2016 he served in the French military, with the Joinville Battalion at Fontainebleau.

== Career ==
Kowal won his first senior title in unusual circumstances at the 2014 European Athletics Championships in Zürich. After initially finishing second in the 3000 metres steeplechase, Kowal was upgraded to the gold medal position when race winner and French teammate Mahiedine Mekhissi-Benabbad was disqualified for removing his shirt in the home straight.

== Competition record ==
| Year | Competition | Venue | Position | Event | Notes |
Representing France
| 2006 | World Junior Championships | Beijing, China | 14th (h) | 3000 m s'chase | 8:58.74 |
| 2007 | European U23 Championships | Debrecen, Hungary | 11th | 3000 m s'chase | 9:41.75 |
| 2009 | European Indoor Championships | Turin, Italy | 3rd | 1500 m | 3:44.75 |
| 2009 | European U23 Championships | Kaunas, Lithuania | 6th | 1500 m | 3:51.98 |
| 2009 | World Championships | Berlin, Germany | 40th (h) | 1500 m | 3:46.42 |
| 2010 | European Championships | Barcelona, Spain | 5th | 1500 m | 3:43.71 |
| 2011 | European Indoor Championships | Paris, France | 15th (h) | 1500 m | 3:48.51 |
| 2011 | World Championships | Daegu, South Korea | 8th (sf) | 1500 m | 3:37.44 |
| 2012 | World Indoor Championships | Istanbul, Turkey | 10th | 3000 m | 7:47.81 |
| 2012 | Olympic Games | London, United Kingdom | 21st (sf) | 1500 m | 3:43.48 |
| 2013 | European Indoor Championships | Gothenburg, Sweden | 4th | 3000 m | 7:50.89 |
| 2013 | World Championships | Moscow, Russia | 8th | 3000 m s'chase | 8:17.41 |
| 2013 | Jeux de la Francophonie | Nice, France | 2nd | 3000 m s'chase | 8:43.79 |
| 2014 | World Indoor Championships | Sopot, Poland | – | 3000 m | DQ |
| 2014 | European Championships | Zürich, Switzerland | 1st | 3000 m s'chase | 8:26.66 |
| 2015 | European Indoor Championships | Prague, Czech Republic | 23rd (h) | 1500 m | 3:49.99 |
| 2015 | World Championships | Beijing, China | 20th (h) | 3000 m s'chase | 8:41.65 |
| 2016 | European Championships | Amsterdam, Netherlands | 3rd | 3000 m s'chase | 8:30.79 |
| 2016 | Olympic Games | Rio de Janeiro, Brazil | 5th | 3000 m s'chase | 8:16.75 |
| 2017 | World Championships | London, United Kingdom | 13th | 3000 m s'chase | 8:34.53 |
| 2018 | European Championships | Berlin, Germany | 4th | 3000 m s'chase | 8:36.77 |
| 2019 | European Indoor Championships | Glasgow, United Kingdom | 9th | 3000 m | 8:02.85 |
| 2019 | World Championships | Doha, Qatar | 37th (h) | 3000 m s'chase | 8:37.90 |
| 2022 | Mediterranean Games | Oran, Algeria | 8th | Half marathon | 1:09:34 |
| 2022 | European Championships | Munich, Germany | 15th | 10,000 m | 28:17.39 |

== Personal bests ==
Outdoor

- 800 metres – 1:47.95 (Oordegem 2010)
- 1500 metres – 3:33.75 (Paris 2011)
- 3000 metres – 7:45.11 (Paris 2016)
- 5000 metres – 13:34.29 (Stockholm 2016)
- 10,000 metres – 28:05.68 (Pacé 2022)
- 3000 metres steeplechase – 8:12.53 (Rabat 2013)
- 10K – 28:42 (Moirans 2018)
- Half marathon – 1:02:17 (Lille 2022)
- Marathon – 2:14:56 (Paris 2023)

Indoor

- 800 metres – 1:49.58 (Bordeaux 2010)
- 1500 metres – 3:38.07 (Stuttgart 2011)
- 2000 metres – 5:04.18 (Bordeaux 2013)
- 3000 metres – 7:44.26 (Liévin 2012)
