= Jacob Araptany =

Ugandan runner (born 1992)

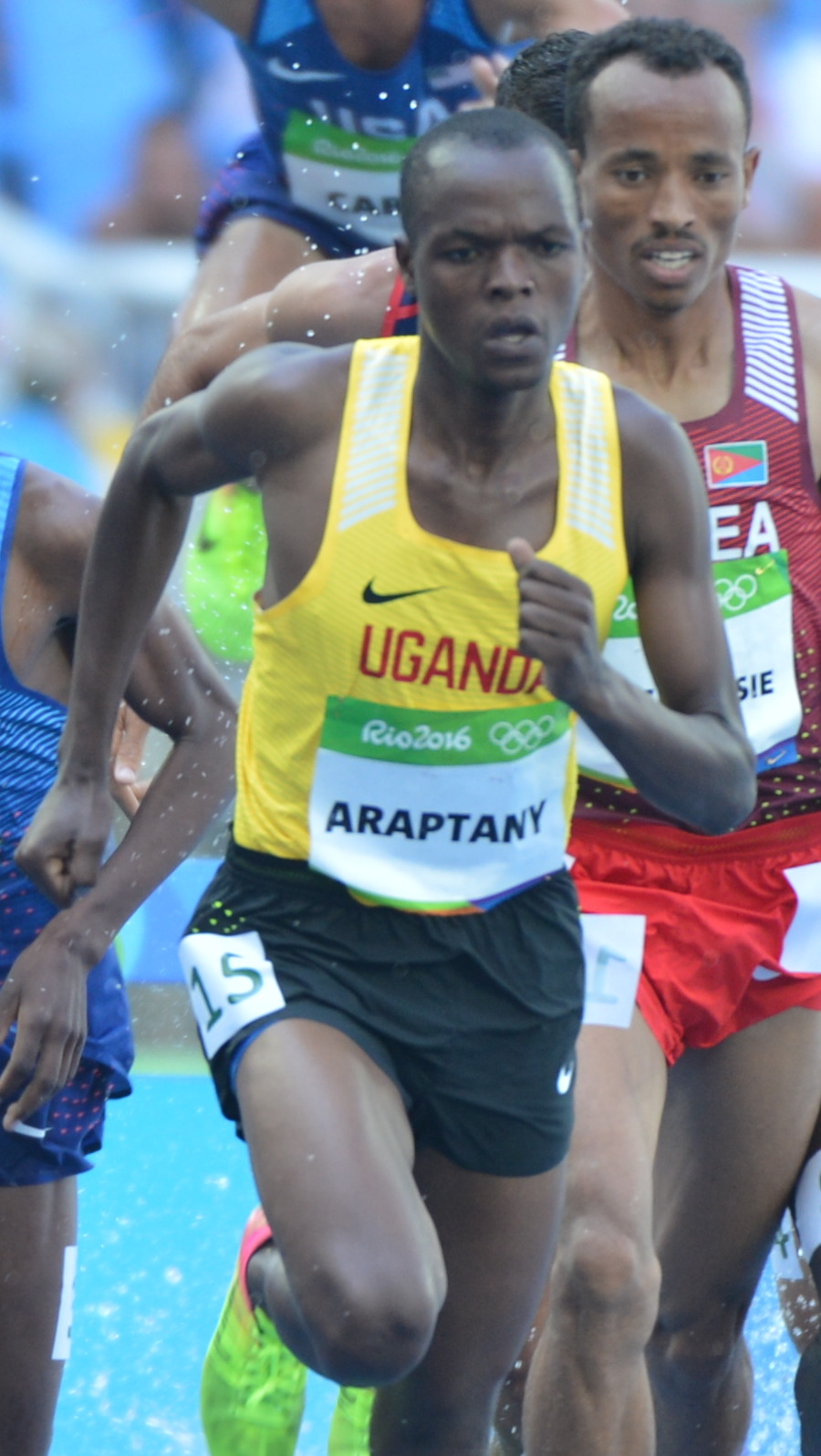
- Araptany at the 2016 Olympics

Personal information
- Born: 11 February 1992 (age 34) Kaproron, Kween District, Uganda
- Height: 168 cm (5 ft 6 in)
- Weight: 58 kg (128 lb)

Sport
- Sport: Athletics
- Events: 800 m, 1500 m, 3000 metres steeplechase
- Club: Kibuuka Memorial
- Coached by: Benjamin Longirosi

Achievements and titles
- Personal bests: 800 m – 1:49.95 (2011); 1500 m – 3:36.16 (2011); 3000 mS – 8:14.48 (2012)

Jacob Araptany (born 11 February 1992) is a Ugandan athlete born in Kaproron, Eastern Uganda. He competed in the 3000 m steeplechase at the 2012 and 2016 Olympics, reaching the final in 2016. He withdrew from the 1500 m event at the 2012 Olympics to focus on the 3000m steeplechase. He missed the 2014 Commonwealth Games because of an injury.

== See also ==
- Leonard Chemutai
- Benjamin Kiplagat
- Steven Kiprotich
