= Ole Hesselbjerg =

Danish middle-distance runner

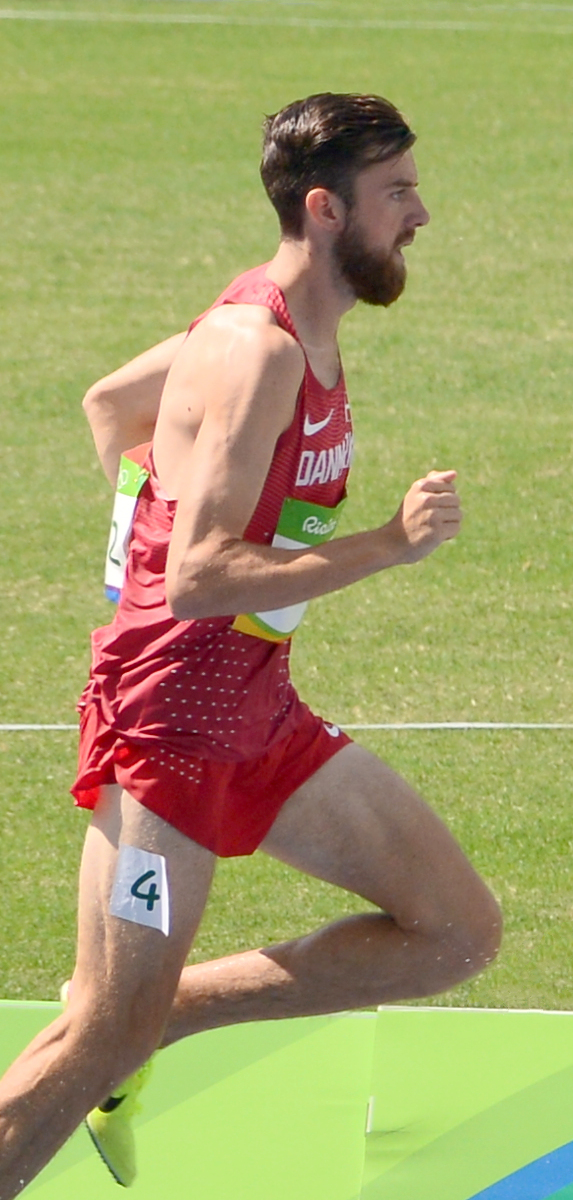
- Hesselbjerg at the 2016 Olympics

Personal information
- Born: 23 April 1990 (age 36) Charlottenlund, Denmark
- Education: Eastern Kentucky University; Technical University of Denmark
- Height: 185 cm (6 ft 1 in)
- Weight: 67 kg (148 lb)

Sport
- Sport: Athletics
- Event: steeplechase
- Club: Sparta, Copenhagen
- Coached by: Heidi Jensen

Achievements and titles
- Personal bests: 3000 m sc – 8:20.42 (2021) NR

Ole Hesselbjerg (born 23 April 1990) is a middle-distance runner from Denmark. He competed in the 3000 metres steeplechase at the 2016 Olympics, but failed to reach the final.

In 2015, Hesselbjerg graduated in physics from Eastern Kentucky University in the United States. After returning to Denmark he worked part-time in a restaurant in Copenhagen, so he could have time for training. He did not qualify for the 2016 Olympics, yet was invited to participate because fewer than the required 45 athletes ran the qualification time, and he was ranked 44th in the world in 2016.
