= Yuri Floriani =

Italian steeplechase runner (born 1981)

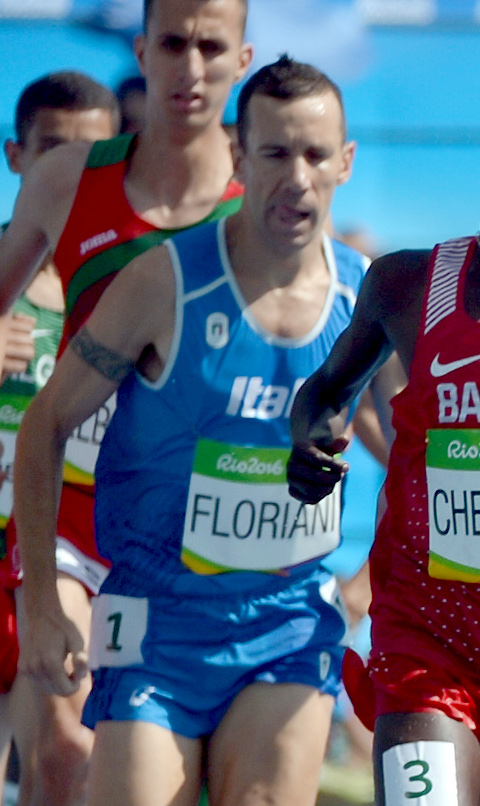
- Floriani at the 2016 Olympics

Personal information
- Nationality: Italian
- Born: 25 December 1981 (age 44) Trento, Italy
- Height: 1.80 m (5 ft 11 in)
- Weight: 64 kg (141 lb)

Sport
- Country: Italy
- Sport: Athletics
- Event: Steeplechase
- Club: G.S. Fiamme Gialle
- Coached by: Stefano Cecchini

Achievements and titles
- Personal best: 3000 m steeplechase: 8'22"62 (2012)

Yuri Floriani (born 25 December 1981) is an Italian steeplechase runner.

== Biography ==
On 31 May 2012 at Golden Gala in Rome, he qualified for the Olympics with his personal best of 8'22"62, for his first Olympic appearance in London 2012.

He lives in Sicily, at Palermo with his wife Angela Rinicella, former middle-distance runner, and their daughter Noemi.

== Achievements ==
Year	Competition	Venue	Position	Event	Notes
Representing Italy
2000	World Junior Championships	Santiago, Chile	29th (h)	3000m steeplechase	9:31.74
2001	European U23 Championships	Amsterdam, Netherlands	15th (h)	3000m steeplechase	8:52.30
2009	Mediterranean Games	Pescara, Italy	4th	3000 m steeplechase	8'34"60
2012	European Championships	Helsinki, Finland	6th	3000 m steeplechase	8'39"22
2012	Olympic Games	London, United Kingdom	13th	3000 metres steeplechase	8.40.07

== National titles ==
- 5 wins in 3000 m steeplechase at the Italian Athletics Championships (2005, 2007, 2008, 2010, 2011)

== Progression ==
3000 metres steeplechase

Year	Performance	Venue	Date	World Ranking
2012	8:22.62	(Italy) Rome	31/05/2012	27th
2011	8:28.64	(Belgium) Heusden-Zolder	16/07/2011	
2010	8:34.15	(Italy) Florence	05/06/2010	
2009	8:34.60	(Italy) Pescara	02/07/2009	
2008	8:28.90	(Italy) Rome	11/07/2008	
2007	8:33.28	(Slovenia) Velenje	28/06/2007	
2006	8:35.88	(Spain) Valencia	28/05/2006	
2005	8:40.82	(Italy) Florence	17/06/2005	
2004	8:36.18	(Italy) Naples	08/06/2004	
2003	8:34.36	(Netherlands) Hengelo	01/06/2003	
2002	8:32.87	(Italy) Castelfidardo	01/09/2002	
2000	8:56.7	(Italy) Pergine Valsugana	28/09/2000	
