= Rob Mullett =

British steeplechase runner

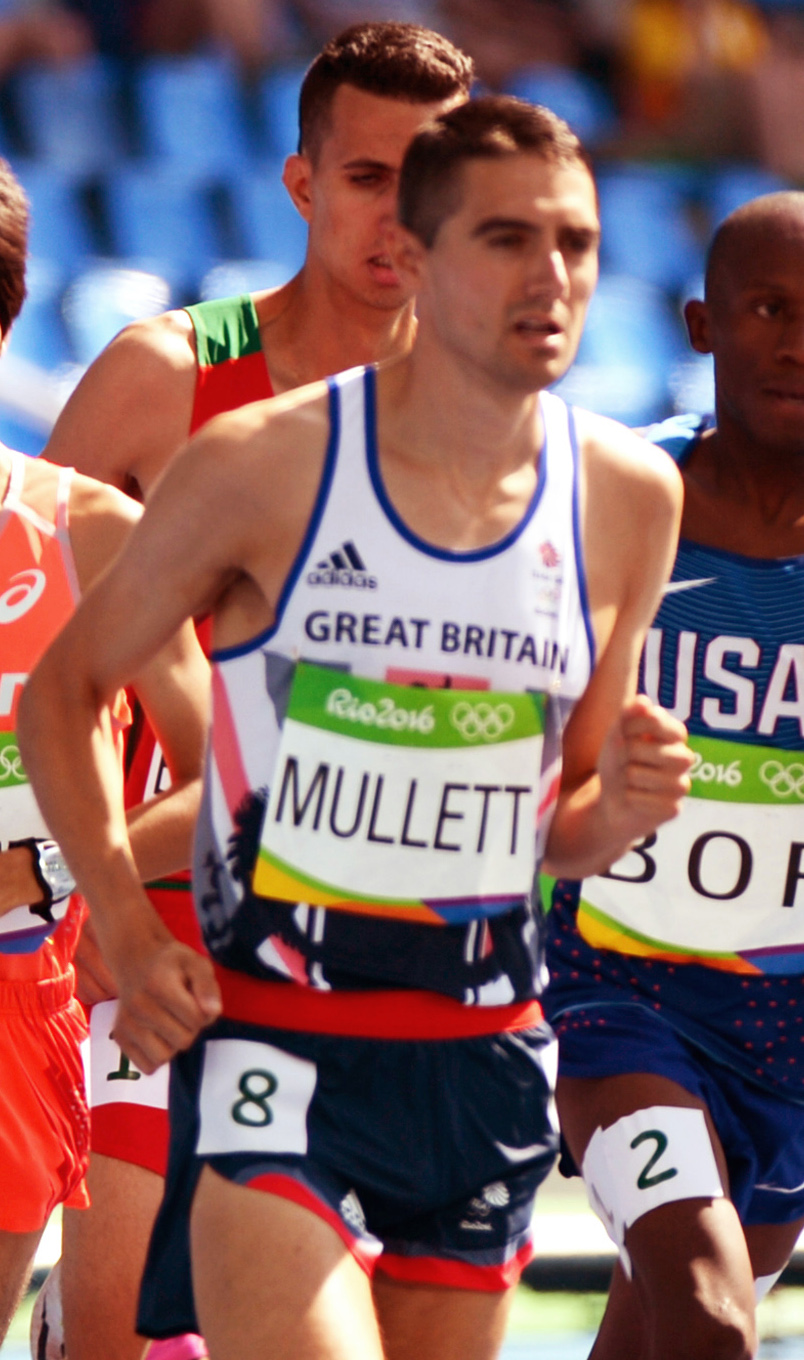
- Mullett at the 2016 Olympics

Personal information
- Born: 31 July 1987 (age 38) Brighton, England
- Height: 178 cm (5 ft 10 in)
- Weight: 64 kg (141 lb)

Sport
- Sport: Athletics
- Event(s): 5000 m, steeplechase
- Club: Lewes AC

Achievements and titles
- Personal best(s): 3000 mS – 8:22.42 (2016); 5000 m – 14:25.90 (2016)

Robert William Mullett (born 31 July 1987) is a British former steeplechase runner. He competed at the 2016 Summer Olympics in the 3000 metres steeplechase event.

== Biography ==
Mullett was born in Brighton and grew up in Sussex and competed for Lewes Athletics club. He completed his undergraduate studies at St Mary's University, Twickenham and after graduating from there, earned a scholarship at Butler University in Indianapolis, Indiana, where he earned a Master's in Education, Teaching and Leadership. At Butler, Mullett became the first sub-four-minute miler in school history and holds the school record in the mile.

At the 2016 Olympic Games in Rio, Mullett represented Great Britain in the steeplechase event finishing 12th in heat 1.

Mullett was three-times British 3000 metres steeplechase champion after winning the British Athletics Championships from 2015 to 2017.

Mullett now lives in Atlanta, Georgia, where he trains with Atlanta Track Club Elite and competes in road races for prize money.
