= Tarık Langat Akdağ =

Kenyan-Turkish long-distance runner

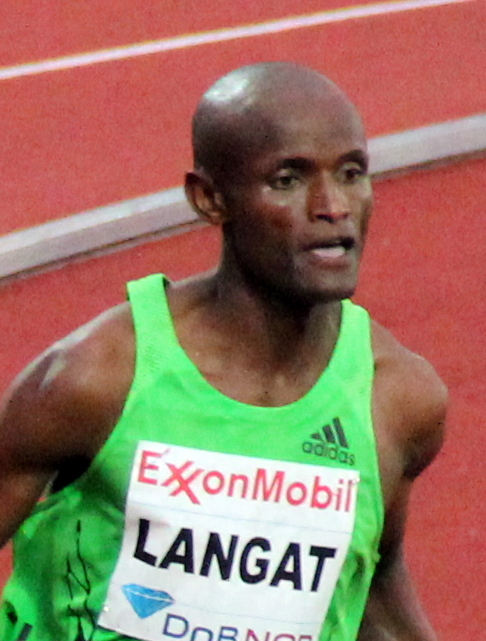

Personal information
- Nationality: Turkey
- Born: Patrick Kipkirui Langat; 16 June 1988 (age 38) Nandi, Kenya
- Height: 1.76 m (5 ft 9 in)
- Weight: 60 kg (132 lb)

Sport
- Sport: Long distance
- Club: Enkaspor
- Coached by: Carol Santa

Achievements and titles
- Personal bests: 3000 m sc 8:08.59 (2011); 5000 m: 14:01.60 (2009); 3000 m indoor: 8:01.29 (2014)
Medal record
Men's athletics
Representing Turkey
European Championships
Silver medal – second place	2012 Helsinki	3000 m steepl.
European Team Championships
Gold medal – first place	2013 Gateshead	3000 m steepl.
Islamic Solidarity Games
Gold medal – first place	2013 Palembang	3000 m steepl.
Mediterranean Games
Silver medal – second place	2013 Mersin	3000 m steepl.

Tarık Langat Akdağ (born Patrick Kipkirui Langat on 16 June 1988, in Nandi, Kenya) is a Kenyan former long-distance runner who represented Turkey competing in the 3000 m and 5000 m events. The 176 cm (5 ft 9 in) tall athlete at 60 kg (130 lb) is a member of Enkaspor, where he is coached by Carol Santa.

== Career ==
He qualified to participate in the 3000 m steeplechase event at the 2012 Summer Olympics, finishing in 9th. At the 2013 Mediterranean Games held in Mersin, Turkey, he won the silver medal in the 3000 m steeplechase event. He became a gold medalist in the 3000 m steeplechase event at the 2013 Islamic Solidarity Games held in Palembang, Indonesia. That year, he also competed at the World Championships. He participated in the 3000 m steeplechase at the 2016 Olympics, but did not finish his heat. In 2017, he competed in the men's 3000 metres steeplechase at the 2017 World Athletics Championships held in London, United Kingdom.

== Achievements ==
Year	Competition	Venue	Position	Event	Notes
2012	European Championships	Helsinki, Finland	2nd	3000 m s'chase	8:35.24
2013	European Team Championships	Gateshead, United Kingdom	1st	3000 m s'chase	8:36.25
2013	Mediterranean Games	Mersin, Turkey	2nd	3000 m s'chase	8:20.08
2013	Islamic Solidarity Games	Palembang, Indonesia	1st	3000 m s'chase	8:28.79
2017	World Championships	London, United Kingdom	44th (h)	3000 m s'chase	8:53.42
2018	Mediterranean Games	Tarragona, Spain	–	3000 m s'chase	DNF
2018	European Championships	Berlin, Germany	–	3000 m s'chase	DNF
