= Great Birmingham 10K =

Road running event in Birmingham, England

- Date: May annually
- Location: Birmingham, UK
- Event type: Road
- Distance: 10K
- Established: 2015
- Website: www.greatrun.org

The Great Birmingham 10K is an annual road running event in Birmingham City Centre, United Kingdom.

Usually held in May, the 10 km (6.2-mile) event takes place in the city centre of Birmingham. Organised by The Great Run Company, the event is part of the Great Run series of events.

== Summary ==
Starting on Jennens Road, close to Millennium Point and Thinktank, the route passes Selfridges and the Bullring Shopping Centre before heading out along the Pershore Road to the furthest turn point at Edgbaston Cricket Ground where the route takes in a lap of the stadium. The first 6km is generally flat, allowing plenty of time to warm up the legs in preparation for the slightly more challenging uphill section between 7km and 8km as the route heads back towards the city centre. The final flat and fast section is topped off with a downhill finish into Broad Street.

Having crossed the finish line participants will be able to relax and meet up with friends and family in the event village in Centenary Square.

== Related events ==
The Great Birmingham Run is the sister event of the Great Birmingham 10K along with the Birmingham International Marathon
