= Great Edinburgh Run =

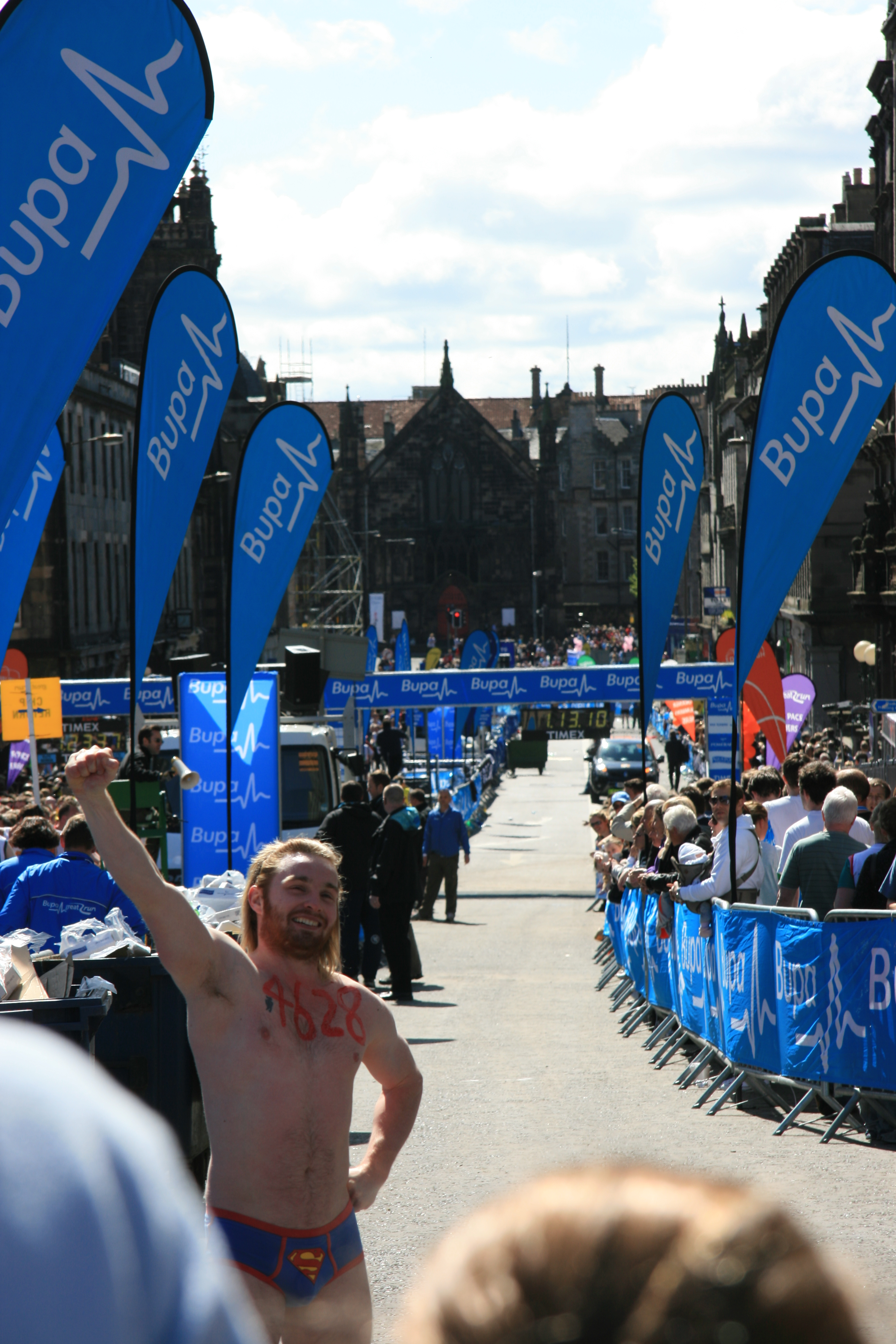
- A fun runner at the race finish point in 2009
- Date: Early October
- Location: Edinburgh
- Event type: Road
- Distance: 10 mile
- Established: 1993
- Website: Great Edinburgh Run

The Great Edinburgh Run was an annual ten-mile road running race in the city centre of Edinburgh in Scotland from 1993 to 2017. It was part of the Great Run series of competitions, a 10 km (6.2 mi) event which extended to ten miles (16 km) from 2014.

The race was first run in 1993 as the Great Caledonian Run. It was moved from Edinburgh to the Balmoral estate in Aberdeenshire in 1998, and was hosted there for seven years as part of the Balmoral Road Races, a collection of races from 3 km to 10 km. The Caledonian run became more of a national level competition in its stint in Balmoral as the 5-mile race. The race in Balmoral was voted the nation's most scenic run by Runner's World magazine in 2004. The competition was financially supported by Scottish Enterprise Grampian in a partnership to promote tourism in north-east Scotland, but after the BBC decided to stop televising the event it returned to Edinburgh in 2005. During the seven-year period that the run was not held in the city, a separate and unrelated competition was held there under the title of the Capital City Challenge 10K. The Great Edinburgh Run acquired its current title in 2006.

From 2005 the Great Edinburgh Run was held on a course within the city centre. Starting in Holyrood Park, runners would see a number of the city's famous landmarks such as Edinburgh Castle, Greyfriars Bobby, Scott Monument and Arthur's Seat.

The men's course record for the 10 km (28:03 minutes) was set by Martin Mathathi in 2011, while Florence Kiplagat is the women's course record holder with her time of 32:10 minutes from 2010. Amateur runner Dave Lewis won the 1994 men's race ahead of Olympians John Treacy and Gary Staines.

== Winners ==
Key:

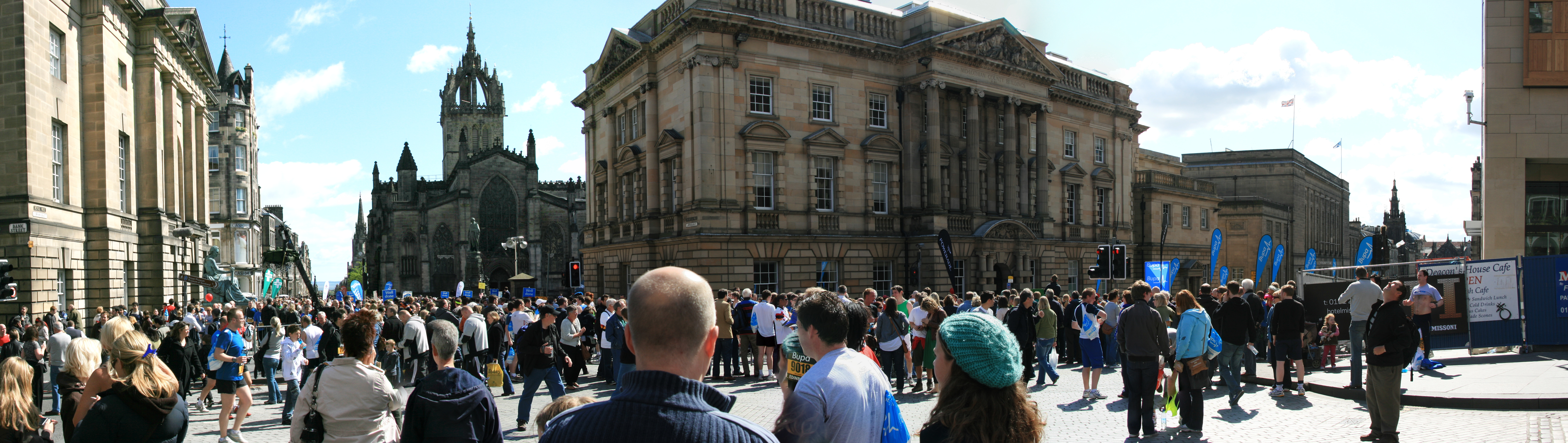
Crowds gathering for the 2009 race

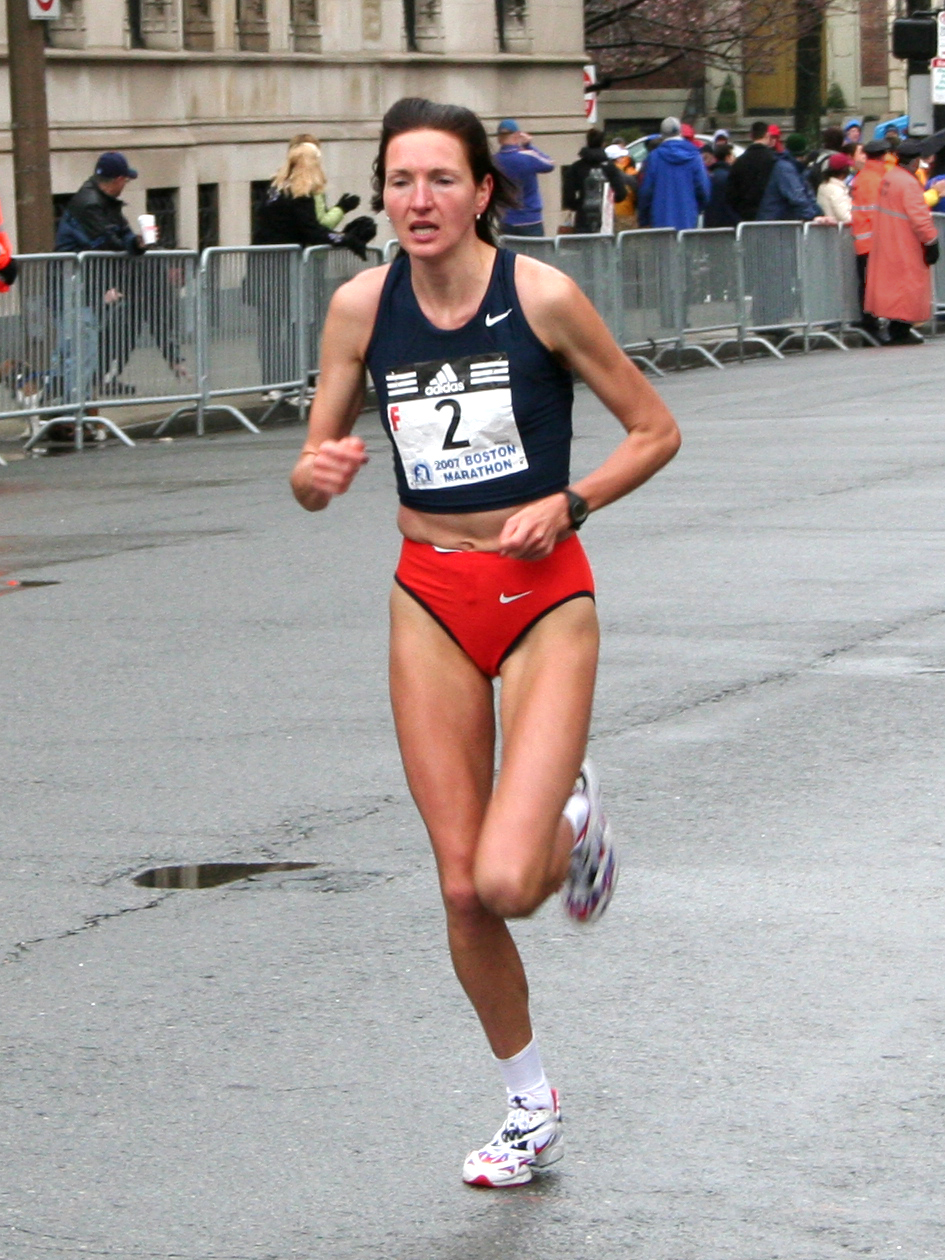
Latvia's Jeļena Prokopčuka won three times consecutively from 2005 to 2007.

Course record 8 km course 5-mile course

Edition	Year	Men's winner	Time (h:m:s)	Women's winner	Time (h:m:s)
1st	1993	Gary Staines (GBR)	28:37	Lyudmila Borisova (RUS)	33:37
2nd	1994	Dave Lewis (GBR)	28:56	?	?
3rd	1995	Gary Staines (GBR)	28:48	Liz McColgan (GBR)	32:27
4th	1996	Christopher Kelong (KEN)	29:11	Yvonne Murray (GBR)	33:16
5th	1997	Christopher Kelong (KEN)	29:05	Liz McColgan (GBR)	32:43
6th	1998	Abdellah Béhar (FRA)	22:52	Paula Radcliffe (GBR)	24:54
7th	1999	Thomas Nyariki (KEN)	28:25	Tegla Loroupe (KEN)	32:26
8th	2000	Mark Carroll (IRL)	25:28	Jo Wilkinson (GBR)	29:26
9th	2001	Dan Whitehead (GBR)	33:16	Janette Stevenson (GBR)	37:46
10th	2002	?	?	?	?
11th	2003	?	?	Liz McColgan (GBR)	37:25
12th	2004	?	?	?	?
13th	2005	Juan Carlos de la Ossa (ESP)	28:22	Jeļena Prokopčuka (LAT)	32:42
14th	2006	Fabiano Joseph (TAN)	28:38	Jeļena Prokopčuka (LAT)	32:25
15th	2007	Hosea Macharinyang (KEN)	29:14	Jeļena Prokopčuka (LAT)	32:53
16th	2008	Bernard Kipyego (KEN)	28:59	Benita Johnson (AUS)	32:20
17th	2009	Micah Kogo (KEN)	28:13	Deena Kastor (USA)	32:38
18th	2010	Titus Mbishei (KEN)	28:46	Florence Kiplagat (KEN)	32:10
19th	2011	Martin Mathathi (KEN)	28:03	Lucy Kabuu (KEN)	32:28
20th	2012	Tom Humphries (GBR)	29:23	Jess Coulson (GBR)	33:12
21st	2013	Andrew Lemoncello (GBR)	30:18	Jen Rhines (USA)	34:22
22nd	2014	Chris Thompson (GBR)	49:36	Gemma Steel (GBR)	56:06
23rd	2015	Abeje Ayana (ETH)	48:44	Jess Coulson (GBR)	56:06
24th	2016	Daniel Wallis (NZL)	51:11	Hillory Davis (AUS)	66.13
25th (last)	2017	Daniel Wallis (NZL)	50:23	Hillory Davis (AUS)	63:42
