= Great Capital Run =

10-kilometre (6 mi) run in London

- Location: 2007-2008 Hyde Park; 2009 Regent's Park; London, United Kingdom
- Event type: road
- Distance: 2007-2008 10k 2009 5k
- Established: 2007
- Website: www.bupagreatcapitalrun.com

The Bupa Great Capital Run was a 10-kilometre (6 mi) road race and fun run through the paths of Hyde Park, London (and later Regent's Park) which was established in 2007. It was one of the Great Run race series.

The event started in 2007 as a 10k race in Hyde Park, sponsored by Bupa. This format continued in 2008 with a new event for 8-to-14-year-olds, a 2.5-kilometre (1.6 mi) run allowing children to run in fancy dress.

In 2009, the main race was reduced to 5k and moved to Regent's Park. This was the final Great Capital Run.

== Winners ==
Edition	Date	Distance	Time (m:s)	Men's winner	Time (m:s)	Women's winner
3rd	13 Sep 2009	5 km	13:45	Andy Baddeley (GBR)	15:42	Freya Ross (GBR)
2nd	20 Jul 2008	10 km	28:42	Mike Kigen (KEN)	33:28	Michelle Ross-Cope (GBR)
1st	15 Jul 2007	10 km	29:22	Ismael Kirui (KEN)	33:23	Hayley Yelling (GBR)

== Sponsors and Partners ==
- Help A London Child
- Capital 95.8
- Lucozade Sport
- Aqua Pura
