= Great Run British Marathon Series =

Series of long-distance running events

The Great Run British Marathon Series is a series of long-distance running events organised by The Great Run Company taking place across the United Kingdom.

It currently comprises the Birmingham International Marathon in the Midlands and the Stirling Scottish Marathon in Scotland, with a third event yet to be announced.

== Stirling Scottish Marathon ==
The Stirling Scottish Marathon, supported by Scottish Athletics and Stirling Council took place on 21 May 2017. Starting west of the city at Blair Drummond Safari Park, the route incorporated the Stirlingshire countryside and landmarks including Doune Castle and Bridge of Allan before it finished beneath Stirling Castle.

== Birmingham International Marathon ==
The 2017 Birmingham International Marathon took place in October 2017, on the same day as the existing Great Birmingham Run. The event began at Alexander Stadium, home of UK Athletics, ran through Bournville, Cannon Hill Park and Edgbaston, and finished in the heart of the city centre.
