= Aqua Pura =

British mineral water brand

Aqua Pura is a brand of mineral water drawn from Cumbria in the United Kingdom. The company is based in Armathwaite.

== Name ==
Aqua Pura means "pure water" in Latin.

== Products ==
Aqua Pura sell mineral water in several sizes. These are 330ml, 500ml, 750ml, 1.5 litre, 2 litre, 2 litre sparkling and 5 litre.

Aqua Pura has 8.2% market share in the UK bottled water market, only second to Evian. The brand is owned by Roxane UK.

== Sponsorship ==
Aqua Pura are currently the shirt sponsors of Carlisle United.

Aqua Pura sponsors several events in the United Kingdom, sponsoring Race for Life, the Great Run series, and the Great Swim series. At the race for life series, there are exclusive pink bottles.
