= Birmingham International Marathon =

- The Birmingham International Marathon logo
- Location: Birmingham
- Event type: Road
- Distance: Marathon
- Established: 2017

The Birmingham International Marathon was a long-distance running event held in Birmingham, UK. It formed part of the Great Run British Marathon Series. The first event was held on 15 October 2017, the same day as the existing Great Birmingham Run in the city centre. The event was cancelled the following year, with organisers blaming the city's ongoing roadworks.

== Overview ==
The event was created by the Great Run Company, organisers of the Great North Run and Great Manchester Run. Starting at Alexander Stadium, the home of British Athletics, the course took in a number of the city's landmarks before finishing in the city centre.

The marathon was launched in Birmingham to attempt to address the slide in standards over the 26.2-mile distance, with just five male athletes breaking the two hour 20 minutes barrier in 2007, and only eight dipping under two hours 30.

Brendan Foster, chairman of the Great Run Company, said: "Our ambition for the Birmingham International Marathon is to do in the autumn what the London Marathon does in spring – to provide a world-class opportunity for top athletes through to people who just want to participate, people who want to raise money for charity." Liz McColgan, who broke her first world record in Birmingham in a career which also saw her win world 10,000m gold, Olympic silver, a world half-marathon title and two Commonwealth gold medals as well as the New York, Tokyo International Women's and London marathons, said: "It's important that we have these events on home soil. We have to establish world-class racing again in Britain. That is what The Great Run Company is enabling us to do now." Former distance runner Ian Stewart said: "The Birmingham marathon is a great idea and I believe we have a real opportunity to build it into a big international event. We're in a central location in the country and with it becoming more and more difficult to get into the London Marathon, why wouldn't people come to Birmingham and run?"

The marathon was cancelled in 2018, having only been run once. Organisers blamed Birmingham's ongoing roadworks for preventing them from planning the event route. Organisers of the 2022 Commonwealth Games, to be in held in Birmingham, suggested that the Commonwealth marathon event could have been held alongside the Birmingham International Marathon.

== Course ==
A mile-and-a-half after leaving the Alexander Stadium runners will pass Villa Park, through Aston, before heading towards the city centre, passing the Selfridges building. Runners will then head towards the Irish Quarter of Digbeth, past the Matthew Boulton College, passing Cannon Hill Park before heading through Selly Park, which leads to Bournville. Runners will then begin their run back to the city centre by passing Edgbaston Cricket ground as they reach the Hagley Road and Five Ways junction, before heading up Broad Street where they will set out on another lap to complete the marathon.

== Winners ==
Key: Course record

Edition	Year	Men's winner	Time (m:s)	Women's winner	Time (m:s)
1st	2017	Chris Ashford (GBR)	2:33:46	Sophie Kelly (GBR)	2:52:58
