= Great North 10K =

Road running event in England

- Great North 10K logo
- Date: July annually
- Location: Newcastle_upon_Tyne, United Kingdom
- Event type: Road
- Distance: 10K
- Website: www.greatrun.org/events/great-north-10k

The Great North 10K, styled as the AJ Bell Great North 10k since 2023 for sponsorship purposes, is a 10K road run, which has been called "the North East's biggest 10K running event", with over 5,000 people taking part. It is part of the Great Run series and the number of participants is only outnumbered by the Great North Run. The race in its present format was first staged in Sunderland in 2009 but changed locations to Gateshead for the 2011 event. Prior to 2009, a 10K race had taken place at Roker along the coastline of Sunderland but the event was only open to female competitors; when it changed to permit male participants, it was re-styled as the Great North 10K. In 2013, the date was brought forward to become the official running event partner of the 2013 European Team Championships.

== History ==
For three years commencing in 2006, a women-only 10K race was held at Roker along the coastline of Sunderland. When the race was opened up to allow for male competitors, it became known as the Great North 10K.

The re-styled Great North 10K run first took place in mid July 2009 in Sunderland and that year it had 4,500 people taking part together with top flight runners from around the world. Olympic bronze medallist Tony Jeffries set the competitors off. The event was televised and broadcast by Channel Five with repeats shown on various Sky Sports channels; highlights were later shown on television channels throughout the world. The overall winner was Steve Mokoka, the champion half marathon runner from South Africa who completed the course in a time of twenty-nine minutes twenty seconds. Male competitors also gained second and third places in the form of Africans Tsegai Tewelde and Tsegezeab Woldmichael. However, the fastest times set in the women's section were all British runners with Kate Reed crossing the line first in thirty-three minutes twenty-two seconds. Hayley Haining was second and Rosemary Ryan from Ireland was third. The event was described in the Sunderland Echo newspaper as having an "electric atmosphere" together with "perfect running conditions" making it a "huge hit".

By 2010, it was only beaten numerically by the Great North Run as the biggest North East running event as the 10K race had increased in popularity and attracted over 5,000 competitors. The event was gain televised by Channel Five and networked worldwide through the Sky Sports channel. An episode of the Street Barber was also filmed for the BBC's The One Show programme featuring celebrity hairdresser Michael Douglas who was offering to re-style some of the fun runners hairstyles.

In 2011, it changed locations to the Gateshead International Stadium, which meant spectators were able to watch the finish from the grandstand.

Together with Olympic medallist Brendan Foster, Gateshead Council had originally organised fun runs in late 1977; this is believed to have been the onset of these events in the north east. Three runners who had taken part in the 1977 race were guests of honour in 2013.

The date of the run was brought forward in 2013 so that, for the first time, the European Athletics Team Championships was partnered with the Great North run. Staged to coincide with the final day of the championships, the climax was described by Mick Henry, the Gateshead Council leader, as a "fantastic weekend for sport in Gateshead". Several competitors responded positively to this, with Linda Green, a Gateshead council member saying "Thousands of runners sharing the finish line with Europe’s biggest athletes such as Mo Farah, is something they will never forget".

Mike McLeod, winner of the first Great North Runs in 1981 and 1982 and winner of a silver Olympic medal in 1984, was the race starter in 2013.

The race was not run in 2020 due to restrictions in place around the Coronavirus Pandemic.

== Competitors ==
Participants are made up from fun-runners, many who are raising funds for charity, and competitive elite and club racers.

In the inaugural race held in Sunderland in mid July 2009, those taking part included Dan Robinson and Matt O'Dowd, who had represented Britain in the marathon at the Olympics, and Tegla Loroupe the Kenyan long-distance track and road runner. The whole team from the Northern Division Premier League champions of Sunderland Women's Football Club took part in the run as a way of boosting their overall fitness.

During the 2012 race, 200 Gurkha soldiers, who were undertaking a 39-week training period at Catterick Garrison, joined the race; a contingent of 150 Gurkha soldiers also competed in 2013. The Gurkhas were joined by fifty personnel from the Guards Training Company who competed for the first time in 2013. The Guards Training Company is also based at Catterick and has responsibility for the ITC Catterick Foot Guards Combat Infantryman's Course.

== Route ==
In 2009 and 2010 when the event was staged in Sunderland, the race started at the Stadium of Light, headed over Wearmouth Bridge then along Fawcett Street heading to Mowbray Park. The competitors then turned back over the bridge to follow the coastline and return to the finishing line at the Stadium of Light. This route provided a fairly flat course.

Since moving location to Gateshead in 2011, the race starts just outside Gateshead International Stadium on Saltmeadows Road. The route goes past Northern landmarks, such as the Millennium Bridge, the Sage, the Tyne Bridge and the finishing line is within the Gateshead International Stadium.

In 2023 the route was changed to concentrate more around central Newcastle, and was changed again for 2025 to start and finish on the Great North Road next to the Town Moor, Newcastle.

== Past winners ==
Year	Men's race	Time (m:s)	Women's race	Time (m:s)
2009	Stephen Mokoka (RSA)	29:20	Kate Reed (GBR)	33:22
2010	Edwin Kipkorir (KEN)	28:44	Susan Partridge (GBR)	33:46
2011	Scott Overall (GBR)	29:48	Louise Damen (GBR)	33:53
2012	Scott Overall (GBR)	29:34	Gemma Steel (GBR)	32:56
2013	Ryan McLeod (GBR)	30:28	Gemma Steel (GBR)	33:26
2014	Stephen Kiprotich (UGA)	29:39	Gemma Steel (GBR)	32:45
2015	Abdi Nageeye (NED)	29:50	Fionnuala McCormack (IRE)	33:19
2016	Sparrow Morley (GBR)	34:27	Michelle Nolan (GBR)	38:24
2017	Matty Hynes (GBR)	31:45	Sarah Laverty (GBR)	37:28
2018	Chris Steele (GBR)	33:16	Gemma Steel (GBR)	35:22
2019	James Mckenzie (GBR)	33:11	Ashley Gibson (GBR)	35:40
2021	Chris Thompson (GBR)	29:44	Kirsty Longley (GBR)	35:11
2022	Chris Thompson (GBR)	28:59	Kate Maltby (GBR)	34:46
2023	Calum Johnson (GBR)	30:19	Phillipa Williams (GBR)	34:44
2024	John Bell (GBR)	30:52	Gemma Steel (GBR)	34:23
2025	Dean Williamson (GBR)	30:20	Louise Small (GBR)	33:35
