= 1999 European Athletics U23 Championships – Men's 3000 metres steeplechase =

The men's 3000 metres steeplechase event at the 1999 European Athletics U23 Championships was held in Gothenburg, Sweden, at Ullevi on 29 and 31 July 1999.

== Medalists ==
Gold	Günther Weidlinger; Austria
Silver	Gaël Pencreach; France
Bronze	Antonio David Jiménez; Spain

== Results ==
=== Final ===
31 July

Rank	Name	Nationality	Time	Notes
1st place, gold medalist(s)	Günther Weidlinger	Austria	8:30.34	CR
2nd place, silver medalist(s)	Gaël Pencreach	France	8:35.60	
3rd place, bronze medalist(s)	Antonio David Jiménez	Spain	8:37.29	
4	Roman Usov	Russia	8:39.25	
5	Antonio Álvarez	Spain	8:40.66	
6	Quentin Jarmuszewicz	France	8:41.04	
7	Filmon Ghirmai	Germany	8:42.87	
8	Yuriy Gichun	Ukraine	8:43.11	
9	Ralf Assmus	Germany	8:47.59	
10	Manuel Silva	Portugal	8:48.50	
11	David Gerych	Czech Republic	8:50.95	
12	Mikael Talasjoki	Finland	9:04.96	

=== Heats ===
29 July
Qualified: first 4 in each heat and 4 best to the Final

==== Heat 1 ====
Rank	Name	Nationality	Time	Notes
1	Gaël Pencreach	France	8:40.21	Q
2	Antonio Álvarez	Spain	8:41.26	Q
3	Manuel Silva	Portugal	8:41.42	Q
4	Ralf Assmus	Germany	8:41.60	Q
5	Mikael Talasjoki	Finland	8:42.40	q
6	David Gerych	Czech Republic	8:45.41	q
7	Josep Sansa	Andorra	8:48.44	
8	António Martínez	Spain	8:48.49	
9	Michał Kaczmarek	Poland	8:56.82	
10	Andrew Hennessy	Great Britain	8:57.48	
11	Sveinn Margeirsson	Iceland	9:00.21	

==== Heat 2 ====
Rank	Name	Nationality	Time	Notes
1	Antonio David Jiménez	Spain	8:39.06	Q
2	Günther Weidlinger	Austria	8:40.57	Q
3	Roman Usov	Russia	8:42.45	Q
4	Quentin Jarmuszewicz	France	8:43.19	Q
5	Filmon Ghirmai	Germany	8:43.54	q
6	Yuriy Gichun	Ukraine	8:43.70	q
7	Levente Timár	Hungary	8:48.27	
8	Marcin Grzegorzewski	Poland	8:50.51	
9	Tuomo Lehtinen	Finland	8:51.22	
10	Damien Rouquet	France	8:.59.25	
11	Mindaugas Pukštas	Lithuania	8:59.86	
12	Ben Whitby	Great Britain	9:10.83	

== Participation ==
According to an unofficial count, 23 athletes from 15 countries participated in the event.

- Andorra (1)
- Austria (1)
- Czech Republic (1)
- Finland (2)
- France (3)
- Germany (2)
- Great Britain (2)
- Hungary (1)
- Iceland (1)
- Lithuania (1)
- Poland (2)
- Portugal (1)
- Russia (1)
- Spain (3)
- Ukraine (1)
