= Great Newham London Run =

- Date: July annually
- Location: Newham, London, United Kingdom
- Event type: Road
- Distance: 10K
- Established: 2015
- Last held: 2017
- Course records: 00:31:44 (John Beattie, 2015); 00:36:31 (Katie White, 2016)
- Website: www.greatrun.org

The Simplyhealth Great Newham London Run was a 10-kilometre (6 mi) run around the Queen Elizabeth Olympic Park in Newham, London, and finishing across the line inside the Stadium at Queen Elizabeth Olympic Park. The run was established in 2015 and ended in 2017. It was one of the Great Run series of races.

== Past winners ==
Key: Course record

| Edition | Year | Men's winner | Time (m:s) | Women's winner | Time (m:s) |
|---|---|---|---|---|---|
| 1st | 2015 | John Beattie | 31:44 | Fiona Thompson | 36:50 |
| 2nd | 2016 | James Denne | 32:44 | Katie White | 36:31 |

== Sponsors and partners ==
- Newham Borough Council
- Virgin Trains
- Puma
- Lucozade Sport
- Aqua Pura
