= 2002 European Athletics Championships – Men's 3000 metres steeplechase =

Men's 3000 metres steeplechase at the European Athletics Championships

The men's 3000 metres steeplechase at the 2002 European Athletics Championships were held at the Olympic Stadium on August 7–10.

== Medalists ==
| Gold | Silver | Bronze |
|---|---|---|
| Antonio Jiménez; Spain | Simon Vroemen; Netherlands | Luis Miguel Martín; Spain |

== Results ==
=== Heats ===
Qualification: First 4 of each heat (Q) and the next 3 fastest (q) qualified for the final.

| Rank | Heat | Name | Nationality | Time | Notes |
|---|---|---|---|---|---|
| 1 | 1 | Antonio Jiménez | Spain | 8:27.61 | Q |
| 2 | 1 | Luis Miguel Martín | Spain | 8:27.66 | Q |
| 3 | 1 | Bouabdellah Tahri | France | 8:28.16 | Q |
| 4 | 1 | Roman Usov | Russia | 8:28.71 | Q |
| 5 | 1 | Günther Weidlinger | Austria | 8:28.93 | q |
| 6 | 2 | Simon Vroemen | Netherlands | 8:29.64 | Q |
| 7 | 2 | Martin Pröll | Austria | 8:30.03 | Q |
| 8 | 2 | Vincent Le Dauphin | France | 8:30.52 | Q |
| 9 | 2 | Vadym Slobodenyuk | Ukraine | 8:31.08 | Q |
| 10 | 2 | Eliseo Martín | Spain | 8:32.36 | q |
| 11 | 2 | Rafał Wójcik | Poland | 8:32.47 | q |
| 12 | 2 | Luciano Di Pardo | Italy | 8:33.25 | q |
| 13 | 2 | Kim Bergdahl | Finland | 8:36.32 | |
| 14 | 1 | Frédéric Denis | France | 8:36.44 | |
| 15 | 1 | Mario Teixeira | Portugal | 8:37.82 | |
| 16 | 2 | Christian Belz | Switzerland | 8:38.19 | |
| 17 | 2 | Jim Svenoy | Norway | 8:38.85 | |
| 18 | 1 | Henrik Skoog | Sweden | 8:40.97 | |
| 19 | 1 | Jakub Czaja | Poland | 8:42.25 | |
| 20 | 2 | Manuel Silva | Portugal | 8:42.85 | |
| 21 | 2 | Filmon Ghirmai | Germany | 8:44.55 | |
| 22 | 1 | Damian Kallabis | Germany | 8:51.39 | |
| 23 | 1 | Angelo Iannelli | Italy | 8:52.45 | |
| | 1 | Boštjan Buč | Slovenia | DNF | |

=== Final ===
| Rank | Name | Nationality | Time | Notes |
|---|---|---|---|---|
| 1st place, gold medalist(s) | Antonio Jiménez | Spain | 8:24.34 | |
| 2nd place, silver medalist(s) | Simon Vroemen | Netherlands | 8:24.45 | |
| 3rd place, bronze medalist(s) | Luis Miguel Martín | Spain | 8:24.72 | SB |
| 4 | Bouabdellah Tahri | France | 8:26.86 | |
| 5 | Eliseo Martín | Spain | 8:28.63 | |
| 6 | Vadym Slobodenyuk | Ukraine | 8:30.16 | |
| 7 | Martin Pröll | Austria | 8:33.24 | |
| 8 | Rafał Wójcik | Poland | 8:35.41 | |
| 9 | Vincent Le Dauphin | France | 8:40.39 | |
| 10 | Roman Usov | Russia | 8:42.62 | |
| 11 | Luciano Di Pardo | Italy | 8:46.13 | |
| 12 | Günther Weidlinger | Austria | 9:00.82 | |
