= 1996 World Junior Championships in Athletics – Men's 3000 metres steeplechase =

The men's 3000 metres steeplechase event at the 1996 World Junior Championships in Athletics was held in Sydney, Australia, at International Athletic Centre on 22 and 24 August.

== Medalists ==
Gold	Julius Chelule; Kenya
Silver	Kipkirui Misoi; Kenya
Bronze	Ali Ezzine; Morocco

== Results ==
=== Final ===
24 August

Rank	Name	Nationality	Time	Notes
1st place, gold medalist(s)	Julius Chelule	Kenya	8:33.09	
2nd place, silver medalist(s)	Kipkirui Misoi	Kenya	8:33.31	
3rd place, bronze medalist(s)	Ali Ezzine	Morocco	8:35.60	
4	Günther Weidlinger	Austria	8:38.97	
5	Antonio Álvarez	Spain	8:41.98	
6	Million Wolde	Ethiopia	8:42.37	
7	Bouabdallah Tahri	France	8:45.85	
8	Li Changzhong	China	8:46.74	
9	Benjamin Hetzler	Germany	8:47.46	
10	Baghdad Rachem	Algeria	8:59.52	
11	Kevin Nash	United Kingdom	9:01.14	
12	Rachid Amroug	Morocco	9:06.70	

=== Heats ===
22 August

==== Heat 1 ====
Rank	Name	Nationality	Time	Notes
1	Ali Ezzine	Morocco	8:48.44	Q
2	Günther Weidlinger	Austria	8:49.06	Q
3	Kevin Nash	United Kingdom	8:51.36	Q
4	Tomasz Sikorski	Poland	8:55.84	
5	Azzedine Zerdoum	Algeria	8:56.53	
6	Jeremy Tolman	United States	8:56.93	
7	Tuomo Lehtinen	Finland	9:11.11	
8	Ramiro Nogueiro	Brazil	9:12.03	
9	Martin Dent	Australia	9:12.25	
10	Roman Usov	Russia	9:20.86	
11	Rogelio Fernández	Uruguay	9:34.29	

==== Heat 2 ====
Rank	Name	Nationality	Time	Notes
1	Kipkirui Misoi	Kenya	8:46.22	Q
2	Million Wolde	Ethiopia	8:46.61	Q
3	Li Changzhong	China	8:50.68	Q
4	Rachid Amroug	Morocco	8:53.63	q
5	Antonio Manuel Martínez	Spain	9:01.61	
6	Julián Peralta	Argentina	9:05.05	
7	Gaël Pencréach	France	9:09.69	
8	Mikael Talasjoki	Finland	9:12.95	
9	Aaron Mullins	Australia	9:18.03	
10	Max Frei	Germany	9:32.33	
11	Oscar Meza	Paraguay	9:38.09	

==== Heat 3 ====
Rank	Name	Nationality	Time	Notes
1	Julius Chelule	Kenya	8:44.39	Q
2	Antonio Álvarez	Spain	8:44.52	Q
3	Benjamin Hetzler	Germany	8:44.98	Q
4	Baghdad Rachem	Algeria	8:45.55	q
5	Bouabdallah Tahri	France	8:50.55	q
6	Sydney da Costa	Brazil	8:56.30	
7	Ryan Pirtle	United States	8:57.88	
8	Ben Whitby	United Kingdom	9:04.40	
9	Issam Hammami	Tunisia	9:07.89	
10	Adrian Mucha	Poland	9:14.86	
11	Kjell Van Melkebeke	Belgium	9:37.01	

== Participation ==
According to an unofficial count, 33 athletes from 21 countries participated in the event.

- Algeria (2)
- Argentina (1)
- Australia (2)
- Austria (1)
- Belgium (1)
- Brazil (2)
- China (1)
- Ethiopia (1)
- Finland (2)
- France (2)
- Germany (2)
- Kenya (2)
- Morocco (2)
- Paraguay (1)
- Poland (2)
- Russia (1)
- Spain (2)
- Tunisia (1)
- United Kingdom (2)
- United States (2)
- Uruguay (1)
