= Antonio Jiménez (athlete) =

Spanish long-distance runner

Personal information
- Born: Antonio David Jiménez Pentinel; 18 February 1977 (age 49) Seville, Spain
Medal record
Men's athletics
Representing Spain
European Championships
Gold medal – first place	2002 Munich	3000 m st.
European Indoor Championships
Silver medal – second place	2002 Vienna	3000 m
Mediterranean Games
Gold medal – first place	2001 Radès	3000 m st.
Silver medal – second place	2005 Almería	3000 m st.

Antonio David Jiménez Pentinel (born 18 February 1977 in Seville) is a Spanish long-distance runner specialising in the steeplechase.

He won the gold medal in the 3000m steeplechase at the 2002 European Athletics Championships in Munich. He was a finalist in the same event at the 2004 Olympics.

Jiménez also finished 5th in the 3000m steeplechase final at the 2006 European Athletics Championships in Gothenburg.

== Doping ==
In March 2014 Jiménez was caught in possession of a prohibited substance and he was subsequently handed a 3-year ban from sports.

== Competition record ==
Year	Competition	Venue	Position	Event	Notes
Representing Spain
1999	European U23 Championships	Gothenburg, Sweden	3rd	3000 m s'chase	8:37.29
2001	World Indoor Championships	Lisbon, Portugal	12th	3000 m	8:04.01
2001	World Championships	Edmonton, Canada	6th	3000 m s'chase	8:19.82
2001	Mediterranean Games	Tunis, Tunisia	1st	3000 m s'chase	8:31.31
2002	European Indoor Championships	Vienna, Austria	2nd	3000 m	7:46.49
2002	European Championships	Munich, Germany	1st	3000 m s'chase	8:24.34
2004	World Indoor Championships	Budapest, Hungary	4th	3000 m	7:58.23
2004	Olympic Games	Athens, Greece	14th	3000 m s'chase	8:22.63
2005	European Indoor Championships	Madrid, Spain	16th (h)	3000 m	8:04.44
2005	Mediterranean Games	Almería, Spain	2nd	3000 m s'chase	8:24.47
2005	World Championships	Helsinki, Finland	6th	3000 m s'chase	8:17.69
2006	European Championships	Gothenburg, Sweden	5th	3000 m s'chase	8:28.78
2007	World Championships	Osaka, Japan	31st (h)	3000 m s'chase	8:50.41
2010	Ibero-American Championships	San Fernando, Spain	–	3000 m s'chase	DNF
2012	European Championships	Helsinki, Finland	13th	3000 m s'chase	8:53.30
