= 1997 European Athletics U23 Championships – Men's 3000 metres steeplechase =

The men's 3000 metres steeplechase event at the 1997 European Athletics U23 Championships was held in Turku, Finland, on 12 July 1997.

== Medalists ==
Gold	Luciano Di Pardo; Italy
Silver	Vincent Le Dauphin; France
Bronze	Konstantin Tomskiy; Russia

== Results ==
=== Final ===
12 July

Rank	Name	Nationality	Time	Notes
1st place, gold medalist(s)	Luciano Di Pardo	Italy	8:34.24	
2nd place, silver medalist(s)	Vincent Le Dauphin	France	8:36.92	
3rd place, bronze medalist(s)	Konstantin Tomskiy	Russia	8:37.81	
4	Domenico D'Ambrosio	Italy	8:41.37	
5	Christian Knoblich	Germany	8:42.26	
6	José Luis Blanco	Spain	8:42.86	
7	Gaël Pencreach	France	8:43.16	
8	Aleksey Palagushin	Russia	8:44.87	
9	Ahmed Mohamed	Sweden	8:50.09	
10	Carlos Suárez	Spain	8:56.69	
11	Tomasz Sikorski	Poland	9:06.63	

== Participation ==
According to an unofficial count, 11 athletes from 7 countries participated in the event.

- France (2)
- Germany (1)
- Italy (2)
- Poland (1)
- Russia (2)
- Spain (2)
- Sweden (1)
