= Günther Weidlinger =

Austrian long-distance runner (born 1978)

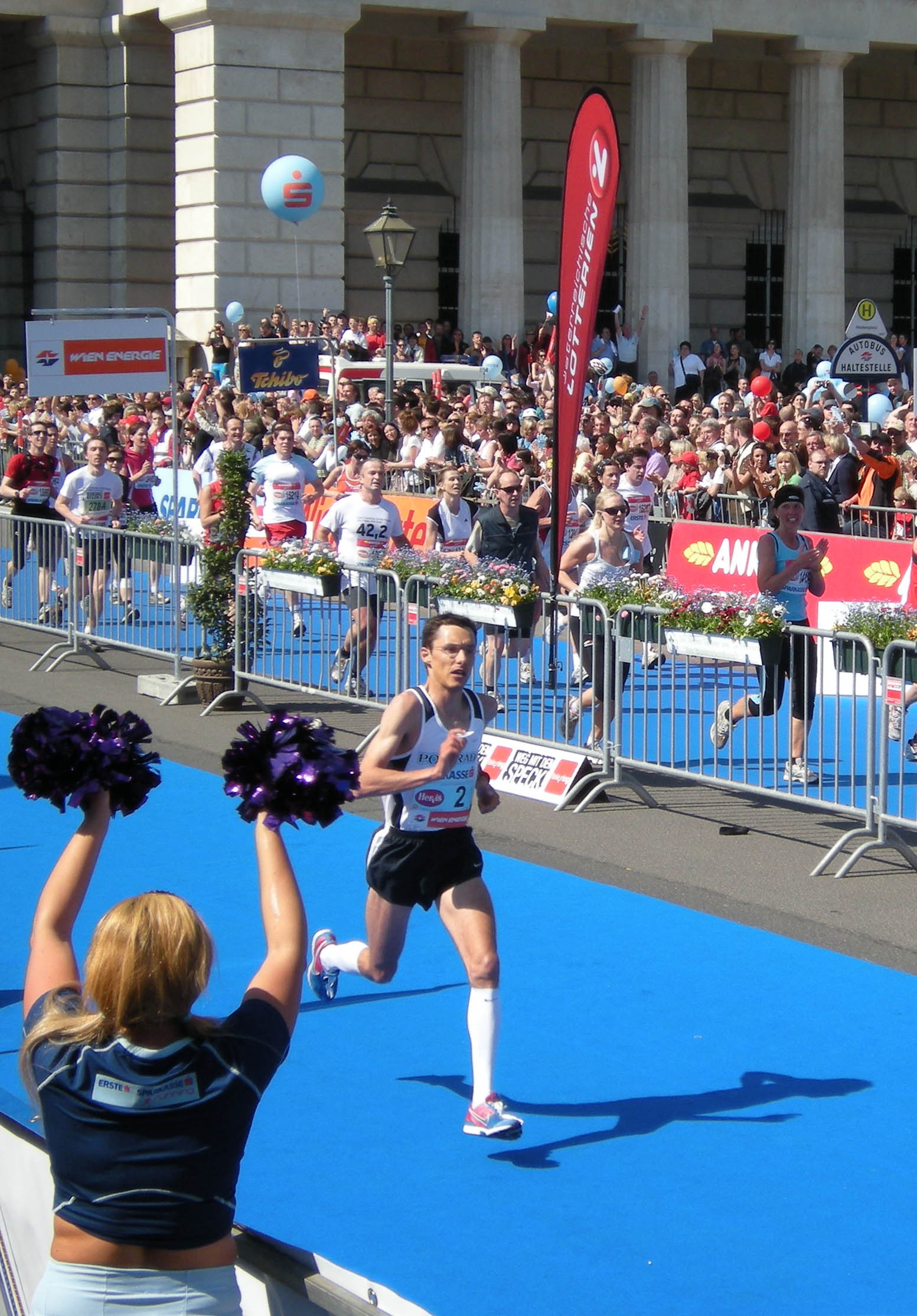
- Weidlinger running in the 2009 Vienna Marathon

Personal information
- Born: April 5, 1978 (age 48) Braunau am Inn, Austria
- Height: 1.69 m (5 ft 6 1/2 in)
- Weight: 54 kg (119 lb)

Sport
- Country: Austria
- Sport: Athletics
- Event: Marathon

Günther Weidlinger (born April 5, 1978 in Braunau am Inn) is an Austrian long-distance runner who is a former 3000 metres steeplechase specialist but now competes in the marathon.

He first made his mark in athletics as a junior athlete in European competitions: winning the steeplechase at the 1997 European Athletics Junior Championships and a silver medal at the 1997 European Cross Country Championships. He set a national record in the event in the final of the 1999 World Championships in Athletics and also reached the final at the 2000 Summer Olympics. He reached a number of major championship finals over the following five years and represented Austria at the 2004 Athens Olympics, as well as the 2003 and 2005 World Championships.

He began to focus on the 10,000 metres and road running in 2007. He won the silver at the 2007 European Cup 10000m and set a half marathon national record at the IAAF World Road Running Championships. Weidlinger won the 2008 Great Manchester Run in another national record time and ran in the 10,000 m at the 2008 Beijing Olympics. He made his marathon debut in 2009 and broke the 23-year-old Austrian record in the marathon on his second attempt, running 2:10:47 at the Frankfurt Marathon. He won the 2009 Great Australian Run to set the 15 km national record.

He is a multiple national record holder with best marks including: 1500 metres, 3000 m steeplechase, 5000 metres, 10,000 m on the track, and 10 km, 15 km, half marathon and marathon in road events. He won his fiftieth national title over all distances and surfaces in March 2011, claiming the Austrian half marathon title.

== Career ==
=== Early career ===
Weidlinger started his career as a specialist in the 3000 metres steeplechase and he just missed out on a medal at the 1996 World Junior Championships in Athletics, finishing fourth in the final. He won his first championship medal the following year, by winning the steeplechase race at the 1997 European Athletics Junior Championships. He began representing Austria in cross country running competitions and after winning a silver medal in the junior race at the 1997 European Cross Country Championships, he stepped up to the senior ranks for the 1998 edition and was fourth, just a second behind Driss El Himer. After winning the gold medal at the 1999 European Athletics U23 Championships, he attended his first global senior championships – the 1999 World Championships in Athletics. He reached the steeplechase final and finished in ninth position with a national record time of 8:10.83. He improved upon this the following year by taking eighth place in the same event at the 2000 Summer Olympics.

Weidlinger took tenth place at the 2002 European Cross Country Championships. Competing at his first European Athletics Championships, he finished twelfth in the final of the 2002 edition. He opened the following season with an appearance in the 3000 metres at the World Indoor Championships, where he reached the final and finished in tenth place. He participated in another global event in the outdoor season, but he did not finish in his steeplechase heat at the 2003 World Championships in Athletics. He finished third at the World Military Games in Sicily in December 2003 at the 5000 metres. He returned to the European Cross Country Championships at the end of his 2003 campaign, but only managed eleventh position on that occasion.

For the 2004, he switched to compete in the plain 3000 m and 5000 metres events but experienced little success: he did not make the final at the 2004 IAAF World Indoor Championships and in the men's 5000 m at the 2004 Athens Olympics he only managed eleventh in the heats. He was invited to compete in the 3000 m at the 2004 IAAF World Athletics Final, but finished dead last – some seven seconds behind the slowest other runner. The 2004 European Cross Country Championships demonstrated that his abilities could be better suited to longer distances as he finished fourth in the men's 9.64 km race.

His 2005 was more successful: he began with a fourth-place finish in the 3000 m at the 2005 European Athletics Indoor Championships. He doubled up at the 2005 World Championships in Athletics, reaching the steeplechase final and finishing eleventh, although he failed to finish in the heats of the 5000 m. He closed the year by running at the 2005 European Cross Country Championships, just missing out on medals, seconds behind the bronze medallist in fifth. In 2006, he was tenth at the 2006 IAAF World Indoor Championships in the 3000 m. He won the 5000 m in the Group A competition at the 2006 European Cup and managed seventh in the steeplechase at the 2006 European Athletics Championships.

=== Move away from steeplechase ===
He began to run over longer distances from 2007 onwards, moving away from being a steeplechase specialist. He started the year at the 2007 European Athletics Indoor Championships, in which he competed in 3000 metres and finished seventh. He came second at the 2007 European Cup 10000m behind André Pollmächer in his first appearance at the competition. At the 2007 Osaka World Championships he suffered an injury after a collision with one of the barriers. He was subsequently rushed to hospital to treat facial injuries received in the fall which included a split lip, and a cut jaw. His was the most serious incident in a series of accidents in the long-distance events at the championships. Weidlinger was considered a certain qualifier and an outside medal chance. He returned to competition soon afterwards, taking tenth place in the 2007 IAAF World Athletics Final the following month and competing at his first IAAF World Road Running Championships at which he finished in 23rd place but set a national record of 1:01:42.

Weidlinger competed at the Cinque Mulini cross country race in early 2008 and managed to finish in sixth place. He set two new national records in May that year: first, he ran 27:36.46 in the 10,000 m at the Payton Jordan Cardinal Invitational in Palo Alto, California, taking second behind Craig Mottram. He then set a 10 km Austrian record at the Great Manchester Run: his winning time of 28:10 was just enough to hold off Serhiy Lebid and Mustafa Mohamed at the finish line. Weidlinger won the Group A 5000 m for a second time at the 2008 European Cup. He competed in the 10,000 m at the 2008 Summer Olympics in Beijing and finished 27th in a time of 28:14.38. This made him the fifth best performing European in the event. On September 1, 2008 he won the Nike Human Race 10K race with a time of 29:25 while running in Munich, Germany.

=== Marathon debut ===
His first major event of 2009 was the Vienna City Marathon, in which he finished in ninth place with a time of 2:12:39 for his debut over the distance. In his second marathon outing, Weidlinger improved the Austrian record by over one and a half minutes at the Frankfurt Marathon on 25 October 2009, setting a new mark of 2:10:47 to finish in tenth place. The record was previously held by Gerhard Hartmann and had gone unbroken for over 23 years. In November, he won the Great Australian Run in a personal best and national record time of 43:01 for the 15 km race, defeating 2008 Olympic champion Samuel Wanjiru among others.

He returned to the Vienna City Marathon in 2010 and was Austria's best prospect for the podium. However, he finished in 12th place in 2:14:05 after suffering from a calf problem. His next major appearance came at the Great South Run in October and he ended the race in sixth position.

== Achievements ==
Year	Competition	Venue	Position	Event	Notes
Representing Austria
1996	World Junior Championships	Sydney, Australia	4th	3000m steeplechase	8:38.97
1999	European U23 Championships	Gothenburg, Sweden	1st	3000m steeplechase	8:30.34
2006	European Championships	Gothenburg, Sweden	7th	3000 m steeple	8:29.54

== Personal bests ==
Track
Event	Time (m:s)	Venue	Date
1500 m	3:34.69	Kassel, Germany	7 June 2000
3000 m	7:48.46	Linz, Austria	2 August 2004
3000 m steeplechase	8:10.83	Seville, Spain	21 August 1999
Two miles	8:21.88	Linz, Austria	23 August 2005
5000 m	13:13.44	London, United Kingdom	22 July 2005
10,000 m	27:36.46	Palo Alto, California, United States	4 May 2008

Road
Event	Time (h:m:s)	Venue	Date
10 km	28:10	Manchester, United Kingdom	18 May 2008
15 km	43:01	Melbourne, Australia	29 November 2009
Half marathon	1:01:42	Udine, Italy	14 October 2007
Marathon	2:10:47	Frankfurt, Germany	25 October 2009

- All information taken from IAAF profile.

== Road race wins ==
- Great Manchester Run: 2008
- Great Australian Run: 2009
