= Kaan Kigen Özbilen =

Kenyan long-distance runner (born 1986)

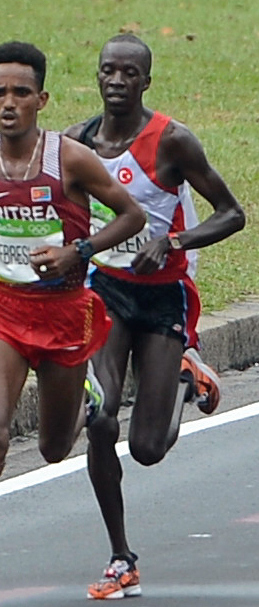
- Özbilen at the 2016 Olympics

Personal information
- Born: 15 January 1986 (age 40)
- Height: 178 cm (5 ft 10 in)
- Weight: 57 kg (126 lb)

Sport
- Sport: Athletics
- Event: 3000m – marathon

Achievements and titles
- Personal bests: 3000m – 7:35.87 (2006); 5000m – 12:58.58 (2006); 10,000m – 27:03.49 (2012); Half marathon – 59:48 (2019); Marathon – 2:04:16 (2019)
Medal record
Men's athletics
Representing Kenya
African Championships
Silver medal – second place	2006 Bambous	5000 m
Silver medal – second place	2006 Bambous	10,000 m
World Cup
Silver medal – second place	2006 Athens	5000 m
Representing Turkey
European Championships
Silver medal – second place	2016 Amsterdam	Half marathon

Mike Kipruto Kigen (born 15 January 1986) is a Kenyan long-distance runner. He specializes in the 5000 metres and 10,000 metres and won silver medals in both events at the African Championships in Athletics in 2006 representing Kenya. In October 2015, he changed his name to Kaan Kigen Özbilen and has since then competed for Turkey.

== Career ==
Kigen was born in Keiyo District. He graduated in 2005 from the Simotwo High School in Ainabkoi, Keiyo South District where he represented the school in various competitions. He is based at the PACE Sports Management training camp in Kaptagat.

Kigen's breakthrough year came in 2006 when he represented Kenya internationally at three competitions. He was fifth at the 2006 IAAF World Cross Country Championships – a placing that brought him a gold medal with the Kenyans in the team competition. He set a personal best of 12:58.58 in the 5000 metres at the Bislett Games in Oslo and became the national champion over the distance.

=== Track running ===
This earned him selection for the 2006 African Championships in Athletics in Bambous, where he scored a silver medal in his preferred distance before going on to win another silver through a personal best of 28:03.70 in the 10,000 metres event. He was not as successful at the 2006 IAAF World Athletics Final, placing seventh in the 5000 m, but his track form returned at the 2006 IAAF World Cup as he took his second 5000 m silver of the year representing Africa. His career was disrupted at the end of the season by a severe knee injury in November.

He returned to competition in 2007, but began to regain his form only in 2008. He won the Great Capital Run in July 2008, recording a course record of 28:42 minutes. At the 2008 IAAF World Athletics Final he ran in the 3000 metres and took fourth place. The following year he attended the 2009 IAAF World Athletics Final (the last edition of the event) and was eleventh over 5000 m.

=== Focus on road and cross country ===
He started the 2010 cross country running season well, with wins at the IAAF permit meeting Antrim International Cross Country and the Crosse Oeust-France. He followed this with another win at the San Sebastián Cross Country but he was not selected for the Kenyan team for the 2010 IAAF World Cross Country Championships. He set a best of 28:09 over 10 km at the Parelloop race in Brunssum in March, coming fourth behind Berhanu Delale. He ran at the Grand 10 Berlin in October and took second place in largely Kenyan affair, finishing with a new personal best of 27:25 for the 10K distance. He returned to the cross country circuit in November, taking third at both the Tuskys Cross Country meet in Kenya and Cross de l'Acier in France. He also won in Antrim the following January, retaining his title.

He was not included in the Kenyan World Cross Country squad and ran his half marathon debut instead at the Lisbon Half Marathon, coming fifth with a time of 1:00:49. Following this he was runner-up to Micah Kogo at the Parelloop in April. He competed on the 2011 IAAF Diamond League circuit, but did not finish higher than seventh place. He did, however, set a 10,000 m best of 27:30.53 minutes at the Memorial Van Damme. Kigen dipped under the hour mark for the first time at the Delhi Half Marathon, and his time of 59:58 minutes was just one second behind the winner Lelisa Desisa.

He began 2012 with his third straight win in Antrim and a second career victory at the Cross de San Sebastián. He came third at the Azkoitia-Azpeitia Half Marathon and second at the Würzburger Residenzlauf. He attempted to gain selection for the 2012 London Olympics, but finished tenth in the 10,000 m trial at the Prefontaine Classic and fifth in the Kenyan 5000 m trial. A personal best run of 27:03.49 minutes came at the Memorial Van Damme. His last outing of the year was a fourth-place finish at the Great North Run.

Kigen made his debut in the marathon in January 2013, coming eighth at the Dubai Marathon with a time of 2:08:24 hours.

In the 2014 Great North Run Kigen led much of the race, being passed by Mo Farah in the final 300m. Both athletes finished in 59:59.

== Achievements ==
Year	Competition	Venue	Position	Notes
2006	World Cross Country Championships	Fukuoka, Japan	5th	Long race
2006	World Cross Country Championships	Fukuoka, Japan	1st	Team competition
2006	African Championships	Bambous, Mauritius	2nd	5000 m
2006	African Championships	Bambous, Mauritius	2nd	10,000 m, 28:03.70 PB
2006	World Athletics Final	Stuttgart, Germany	7th	5000 m
2006	World Cup	Athens, Greece	2nd	5000 m

Records
Preceded by António Pinto; Mo Farah	Men's Marathon European Record Holder; 20 March 2016 – 3 December 2017; 1 December 2019 –	Succeeded by Sondre Nordstad Moen; Incumbent
