= Gary Staines =

British long-distance runner

Personal information
- Nationality: British (English)
- Born: 3 July 1963 (age 62) Welwyn Garden City, England
- Height: 186 cm (6 ft 1 in)
- Weight: 63 kg (139 lb)

Sport
- Sport: Athletics
- Event: middle-distance
- Club: Belgrave Harriers
Medal record
Men's athletics
Representing Great Britain
European Championships
Silver medal – second place	1990 Split	5000 m

Gary Martin Staines (born 3 July 1963) is a male British former long-distance runner who competed at the 1988 Summer Olympics.

== Biography ==
At the 1988 Olympic Games in Seoul, he represented Great Britain in the 5,000 metres. He was the silver medallist in the 5000 metres at the 1990 European Athletics Championships. He was also a team silver medallist with Tim Hutchings at the 1989 IAAF World Cross Country Championships.

He represented England in the 10,000 metres event, at the 1990 Commonwealth Games in Auckland, New Zealand.

Staines was on the podium five times in the 5,000 metres at the AAA Championships from 1987 to 1993.

Staines was successful on the British road racing circuit and was a winner at the Reading Half Marathon (1996), won three-times at the Great South Run (1993, 1994 and 1996), and was twice champion at the Great Edinburgh Run (1993 and 1995). In cross country, he won the 1989 Trofeo Alasport meeting

== Personal life ==
He was formerly married to Australian long jumper Nicole Boegman. He is currently married to British sprinter Linda Keough.
