= Great Tees 10K =

- Date: September annually
- Location: Stockton-on-Tees, United Kingdom
- Event type: Road
- Distance: 10 km (6.2 mi)
- Established: 2018
- Website: www.greatrun.org/great-tees-10k

The Great Tees 10K, styled as the Simplyhealth Great Tees 10K for sponsorship purposes, is a 10K road run, which takes place the same weekend as the Great North Run taking place the day before on the Saturday in Stockton-on-Tees with 1,000 people taking part. It is part of the Great Run series.

The race was first introduced on the weekend of the Great North Run in September 2018. The Elite 1 Mile Race will also take place in Stockton that weekend after moving from Newcastle-upon-Tyne for the first time.
