= Great Ireland Run =

Annual road race in Dublin, Ireland

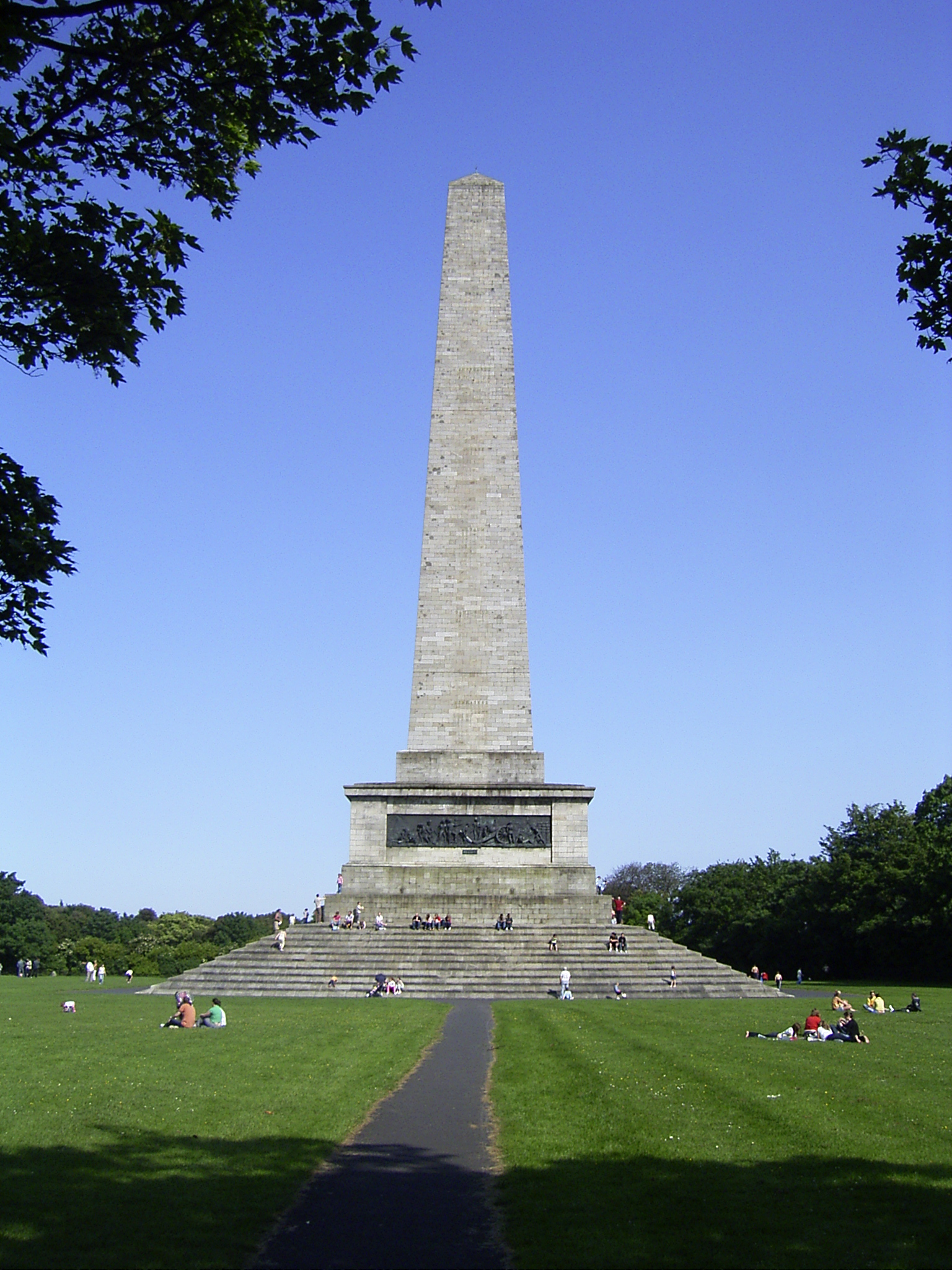
- The Wellington Monument in Phoenix Park – the race venue
- Date: Mid-April
- Location: Dublin, Ireland
- Event type: Road
- Distance: 10 km
- Established: 2003
- Website: www.greatirelandrun.ie

The Great Ireland Run is an annual 10-kilometre road running competition which is held in Phoenix Park, Dublin, Ireland, in mid-April. It is part of the Great Run series of athletics competitions. It is sponsored by SPAR and features both an elite race and a popular race.

The 10 km race course begins at Chesterfield Avenue and loops around in a clock-wise circuit to finish on Furze Road. A 2.5 km fun run for 8–15-year-old runners is also featured on the programme of events. Over 11,000 people took part in the day's events in 2010. The elite races in 2010 also doubled up as the Irish 10K Championships.

Past participants have included former marathon world record holder Paul Tergat, and World Championship medalist Craig Mottram, as well as some of Ireland's foremost athletes such as 1995 World Champion Sonia O'Sullivan and cross country specialist Catherina McKiernan. The course record holders are both Ethiopian – Kenenisa Bekele with his 27:49-minute run in 2012 and Meselech Melkamu with her record of 31:41 set in 2006.

The 2023 edition was marred in farce and controversy when the course for all participants ended 1.5km shorter than the 10km distance. This was due to poor planning arising from competitors being directed the wrong way near the start of the route, and no fail-safe to remedy such a situation once it occurred. Athletics Ireland issued a statement "apologising for the unforeseen circumstances" which led to the course distance running short.

== Past winners ==
Key: Course record Irish championship race

Edition	Year	Men's winner	Time (m:s)	Women's winner	Time (m:s)
20th	2025	Colin Leonard (IRL)	33:24	Mollie O'Donnell (IRL)	38:31
19th	2024	Aaron Hanlon (IRL)	31:10	Clare Fagan (IRL)	34:44
18th	2023	Jake O'Regan (IRL)	26:09	Karen Blaney (AUS)	29:12
17th	2022	Mick Clohisey (IRL)	30:49	Sinead O'Connor (IRL)	34:20
16th	2019	Hiko Tonosa Haso (IRL)	30:41	Catherina Mullen (IRL)	34:52
15th	2018	Oliver Lockley (IOM)	30:18	Shona Heaslip (IRL)	34:52
15th	2017	Mark Christie (IRL)	29:30	Gemma Steel (GBR)	34:15
14th	2016	Andy Maud (GBR)	29:55	Fionnuala McCormack (IRL)	33:30
13th	2015	Japhet Korir (KEN)	28:15	Gemma Steel (GBR)	33:03
12th	2014	Japhet Korir (KEN)	29:12	Iwona Lewandowska (POL)	33:39
11th	2013	Kenenisa Bekele (ETH)	28:51	Lauren Howarth (GBR)	33:36
10th	2012	Kenenisa Bekele (ETH)	27:49	Gemma Steel (GBR)	32:06
9th	2011	Jesús España (ESP)	29:26	Charlotte Purdue (GBR)	32:42
8th	2010	Martin Fagan (IRL)	29:17	Freya Murray (GBR)	32:30
7th	2009	Rui Pedro Silva (POR)	28:45	Ana Dulce Félix (POR)	32:18
6th	2008	Abraham Chebii (KEN)	28:48	Doris Changeywo (KEN)	32:15
5th	2007	Abraham Chebii (KEN)	28:47	Victoria Mitchell (AUS)	33:06
4th	2006	Craig Mottram (AUS)	28:51	Meselech Melkamu (ETH)	31:41
3rd	2005	Craig Mottram (AUS)	28:35	Amy Rudolph (USA)	32:16
2nd	2004	Craig Mottram (AUS)	29:11	Catherina McKiernan (IRL)	33:39
1st	2003	Craig Mottram (AUS)	28:36	Sonia O'Sullivan (IRL)	32:24

== Statistics ==
=== Winners by country ===
Country	Men's race	Women's race	Total
Australia	4	1	5
Kenya	4	1	5
United Kingdom	1	4	5
Ireland	1	3	4
Portugal	1	1	2
Ethiopia	1	1	2
Spain	1	0	1
United States	0	1	1
Poland	0	1	1

=== Multiple winners ===
Athlete	Country	Wins	Years
Kenenisa Bekele	Ethiopia	2	2012–2013
Craig Mottram	Australia	4	2003–2006
Abraham Chebii	Kenya	2	2007, 2008
Japhet Korir	Kenya	2	2014, 2015
Gemma Steel	United Kingdom	3	2012, 2015, 2017
