= Gemma Steel =

British long-distance runner (born 1985)

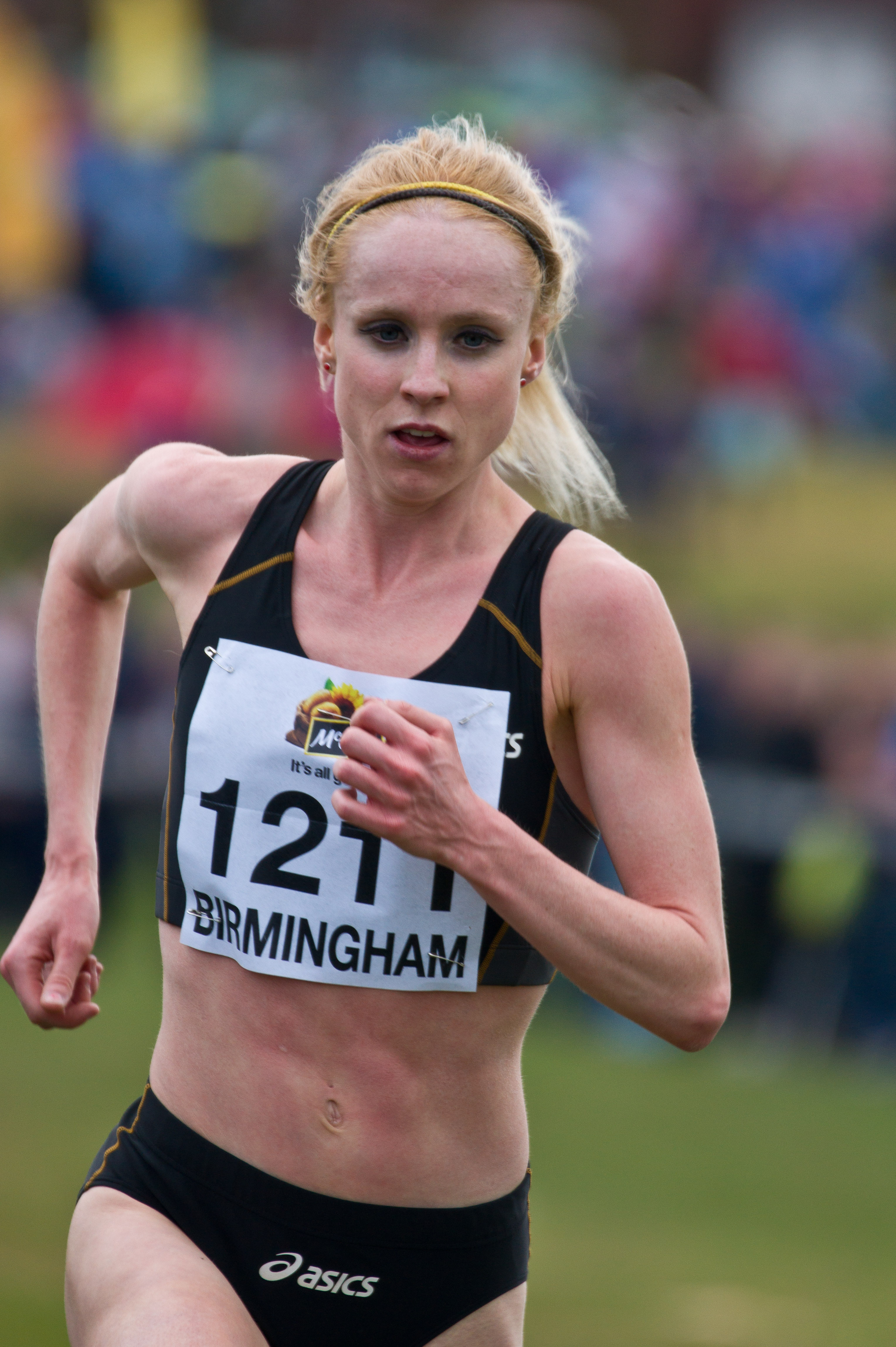
- Steel in 2012

Medal record

Women's athletics

Representing Great Britain

European Cross Country Championships
Gold medal – first place	2014 Samokov	Senior individual
Gold medal – first place	2014 Samokov	Senior team
Gold medal – first place	2011 Velenje	Senior team
Gold medal – first place	2013 Belgrade	Senior team
Gold medal – first place	2015 Hyrès	Senior team
Silver medal – second place	2013 Belgrade	Senior individual
Silver medal – second place	2010 Albufeira	Senior team
Silver medal – second place	2016 Chia	Senior team
Bronze medal – third place	2011 Velenje	Senior individual

Gemma Steel (born 12 November 1985) is a British long-distance runner who competes in road running and cross country running competitions. She was the 2014 gold medallist at the European Cross Country Championships. She has represented Great Britain internationally in cross country, road and track events. She has won at three of the Great Run series events: the Great Ireland Run, Great Birmingham Run and Great Yorkshire Run. She has also won the Bristol Half Marathon and placed seventh at the 2012 IAAF World Half Marathon Championships.

== Early career ==
A member of Charnwood Athletic Club in Loughborough, she is coached by Liz Nuttall. She began competing in local level road races in 2005, running for Hermitage Harriers of Whitwick over distances ranging from five miles (8 km) to the half marathon (21.1 km). She improved her times year-upon-year from 2006 to 2009; she brought her 10k best from over 40 minutes to 34:34 minutes and took her best for the ten-mile race from 67:05 minutes down to 58:03 minutes. She began to establish herself as a national level runner in 2009, taking the Leicestershire cross country title, placing second at the Sheffield Half Marathon and coming third at the Brooks Brighton 10K.

In 2010 Steel was eleventh at the national world cross country trials but at November's UK Cross Challenge in Liverpool she came third and made the Great Britain team for the first time. Running at the 2010 European Cross Country Championships, she finished in 27th place and shared in the team silver medal with the British women. She also competed in her first road races abroad that year, coming second at the Berliner City-Nacht 10k and second at the Bern Grand Prix. She ran a personal best of 33:16 minutes to finish as runner-up at the Cardiff 10k and had another best of 53:44 minutes for fifth at the Great South Run 10-miler a month later. She also had top three finishes at the Swansea Bay 10k and Great Yorkshire Run.

== Senior career ==
She began her 2011 with international level cross country races. She was ninth at the Great Edinburgh Cross Country, sixth at the Cinque Mulini, and won at the Hannut Lotto CrossCup. After a fourth-place finish at the English championships, she made her world level debut at the 2011 IAAF World Cross Country Championships, taking 54th place. She had runner-up finishes at both the Great Ireland Run and London 10,000 (improving her best to 32:48 min), but managed only seventh at the 5000 metres British trials on the track. Her road running season remained at a high standard as she had a number of victories including the Frank Duffy 10 Mile Race, Bristol Half Marathon, Great Yorkshire Run, and the Great Birmingham Run. She was the pre-race favourite for the European Cross Trials, but was beaten at the line by Hatti Dean. At the 2011 European Cross Country Championships, Steel was among the leaders and the midpoint of the race and was in second place by the final lap. She was overtaken by Portugal's Ana Dulce Félix in the final stages, but managed to take third place for an individual bronze medal (her first international podium finish) and to lead the British women to their second ever European team title at the event.

She was runner-up to Fionnuala Britton, the European champion, at the 2012 Great Edinburgh Cross Country and Antrim Cross Country. She set a personal best time of 9:01 minutes in the 3000 m at the AVIVA Indoor Grand Prix. Returning to grass, she won the English National Cross Country championships held at Parliament Hill Fields, as well as the inter-counties championships held at Cofton Park. After warm-weather training in Portugal, she beat defending champion Charlotte Purdue at the Great Ireland Run. She had a string of ninth-place finishes at the Great Manchester Run, European Cup 10000m and in the 10,000 metres at the 2012 European Athletics Championships. She defended her title at the Great Yorkshire Run in September. A switch to longer distances towards the end of the year proved successful as she set a half marathon best of 70:46 minutes at the Great North Run, came seventh at the 2012 IAAF World Half Marathon Championships and placed in the top five at the Great South Run 10-miler.

At the start of 2013 she finished 31st at the World Cross Country Championships and was runner-up at the Great Ireland Run. She focused on 10K runs for most of the year: she was fourth in Manchester, third at the New York Mini 10K, winner at the Great North 10K, runner-up at the Beach to Beacon 10K with a best of 31:36 minutes, third at the Prague Grand Prix, and winner at the Great Yorkshire Run. She also took second place at the Falmouth Road Race 7-miler. She won the Great Birmingham Run for a second time and broke the course record with a personal best of 70:19 minutes. Returning to New England in summer 2014 she ran a PB for 10K, defeating Shalane Flanagan at the TD Beach to Beacon 10 km in 31:26.5. Returning home on a high, she also ran a PB of 68:13 in the Great North Run.

The 2014 season represented something of a high point for Steel. Highlights since include first place in the 2017 edition of the Great South Run with a time of 55:25, and first place in the 10K Great Scottish Run in 2018 with a time of 34:00 minutes.

== Personal bests ==
- 5000 metres – 15:47.21 (2011)
- 10,000 metres – 32:34.81 (2012)
- 10K road – 31:26.5 (2014)
- Half marathon – 1:08:13 (2014)
