= Grace Momanyi =

Kenyan long-distance runner

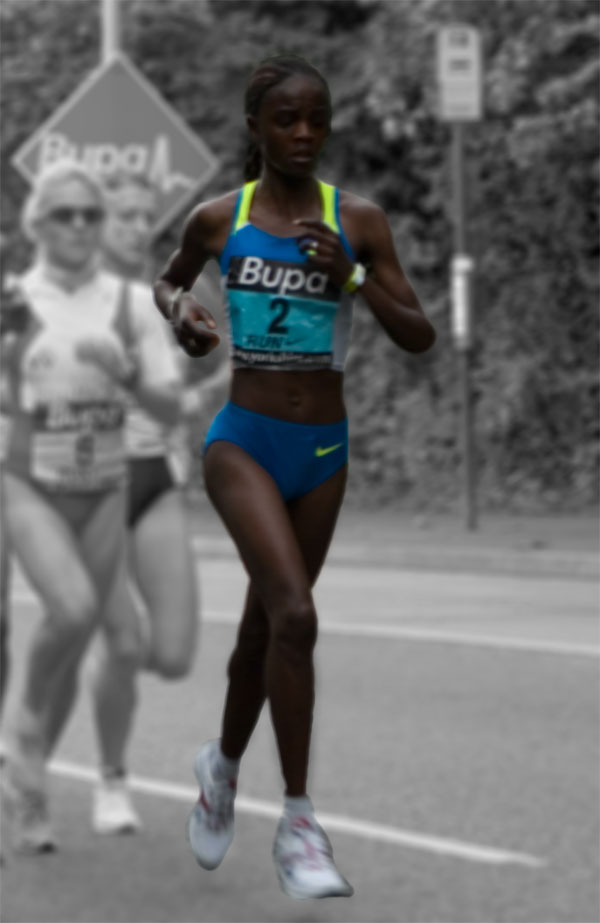
- Grace Momanyi leading the 2008 Great Yorkshire Run

Medal record

Women's athletics

Representing Kenya

African Championships
Bronze medal – third place	2008 Addis Ababa	5000 m

Grace Kwamboka Momanyi (born 5 September 1983) is a Kenyan long-distance runner of the Kisii tribe.

She won the 2000 and 2005 10K races at the Ottawa Marathon, setting a course record in her second victory. In 2006, she moved to Japan to represent local Dauhatsu athletics team, but was mostly out of action due to injuries. She came back in September 2007 and won a couple of local races. She won Kenyan National Cross country championship in 2008.

At the 2008 World Cross Country Championships she finished tenth in the individual race, however, this was not enough to be a part of the Kenyan team, who won silver medals in the team competition. At the 2008 African Championships in Athletics she finished third in the 5000 metres race. She was announced as the joint winner of the inaugural World 10K Bangalore race, finishing with exactly the same time (32:02) as Elvan Abeylegesse.

Momanyi was selected to represent Kenya at the 2008 Summer Olympics in Beijing. She was the national flagbearer of the Kenyan team at the opening ceremony. She was to participate the women's 10,000 metres. However, she did not compete as she was replaced by reserve Peninah Arusei athlete under controversial circumstances. She did much to make up for her Olympic disappointment, setting a 5000 m best at the Memorial Van Damme meeting and going on to win the Great Yorkshire Run 10K race in 32:44 just two days later.

The following year she did get the opportunity to represent Kenya at a global level, running in the 10,000 m at the 2009 World Championships in Athletics. Momanyi was fourth in a close finish, running a personal best of 30:52.25. She was Kenya's second-best athlete in the race after event winner Linet Masai but managed to beat Meseret Defar, one of the pre-race favourites. Momanyi won the 2009 and 2010 editions of the Würzburger Residenzlauf 10 km race. She returned to the Bangalore 10K in May 2010, but could not repeat her past victory and instead finished in third place.

She took to the track for the 2010 Commonwealth Games in New Delhi and emerged as the 10,000 m Commonwealth champion, succeeding her compatriot Lucy Kabuu. Back on the road, she ran in the Great South Run in October and topped the podium. She saw her performance in the ten-mile race as a stepping-stone to a future in road events: "This was a good result and very important as eventually I will be moving to the marathon".

She claimed fourth place at the World's Best 10K in February 2011, but reached the podium at the Lisbon Half Marathon the following month by taking third in a personal best of 1:08:41. She was among the favourites for the Great Manchester Run in May and took third place. She lives in Kisii. She has a child.

== Achievements ==
Year	Competition	Venue	Position	Event	Notes
Representing Kenya
2008	World Cross Country Championships	Edinburgh, United Kingdom	10th	Senior race	
2008	African Championships	Addis Ababa, Ethiopia	3rd	5000 m	15:50.19
2008	World Athletics Final	Stuttgart, Germany	7th	5000 m	
2009	World Championships	Berlin, Germany	4th	10,000 m	30:52.25
2009	World Athletics Final	Thessaloniki, Greece	8th	5000 m	15:32.43
2010	Commonwealth Games	New Delhi, India	1st	10,000 m	32:34.11

== Personal bests ==
- 3000 metres - 8:56.37 min (2009)
- 5000 metres - 14:50.77 min (2009)
- 10000 metres - 30:52.25 min (2009)
- Half marathon - 1:08:41 hrs (2011)

Olympic Games
Preceded by Philip Boit	Flagbearer for Kenya; Beijing 2008	Succeeded by Jason Dunford
