= Gaël Pencreach =

French steeplechase runner

Gaël Pencreach (born 5 August 1977 in Le Creusot) is a retired French athlete who specialised in the 3000 metres steeplechase. He represented his country at the 2000 Summer Olympics placing 14th in the final.

== Competition record ==
Year	Competition	Venue	Position	Event	Notes
Representing France
1996	World Junior Championships	Sydney, Australia	22nd (h)	3000 m s'chase	9:09.69
1997	European U23 Championships	Turku, Finland	7th	3000m steeplechase	8:43.16
1999	European U23 Championships	Gothenburg, Sweden	2nd	3000 m s'chase	8:35.60
1999	World Championships	Seville, Spain	18th (h)	3000 m s'chase	8:21.89
2000	Olympic Games	Sydney, Australia	14th	3000 m s'chase	8:41.19
2001	World Championships	Edmonton, Canada	15th	3000 m s'chase	8:41.51
2005	Mediterranean Games	Almería, Spain	3rd	3000 m s'chase	8:25.82
2005	World Championships	Helsinki, Finland	17th (h)	3000 m s'chase	8:23.96

== Personal bests ==
Outdoor

- 3000 metres – 7:58.73 (Villeneuve-d'Ascq 2002)
- 5000 metres – 15:12.05 (Albuquerque 2002)
- 3000 metres steeplechase – 8:13.16 (Saint-Denis 1999)

Indoor

- 1500 metres – 3:48.49 (Mondeville 2005)
- 3000 metres – 7:57.03 (Liévin 1999)
