= 2002 European Athletics Indoor Championships – Men's 3000 metres =

The men's 3000 metres event at the 2002 European Athletics Indoor Championships was held on March 2.

== Results ==
| Rank | Name | Nationality | Time | Notes |
|---|---|---|---|---|
| 1st place, gold medalist(s) | Alberto García | Spain | 7:43.89 | CR |
| 2nd place, silver medalist(s) | Antonio David Jiménez | Spain | 7:46.49 | PB |
| 3rd place, bronze medalist(s) | Jesus España | Spain | 7:48.08 | PB |
| 3rd place, bronze medalist(s) | John Mayock | Great Britain | 7:48.08 | |
| 5 | Michael Buchleitner | Austria | 7:54.39 | SB |
| 6 | Mohammed Mourhit | Belgium | 7:59.79 | |
| 7 | Sergey Ivanov | Russia | 8:02.98 | |
| 8 | Mindaugas Pukštas | Lithuania | 8:03.21 | PB |
| 9 | Irba Lakhal | France | 8:03.38 | |
| 10 | Joakim Johansson | Denmark | 8:06.47 | |
| 11 | Harald Steindorfer | Austria | 8:09.21 | |
| 12 | Ferdinando Vicari | Italy | 8:17.46 | |
| 13 | Martin Steinbauer | Austria | 8:22.06 | |
| 14 | Christos Papapetrou | Cyprus | 8:30.59 | |
