= Susan Partridge (athlete) =

British long-distance runner

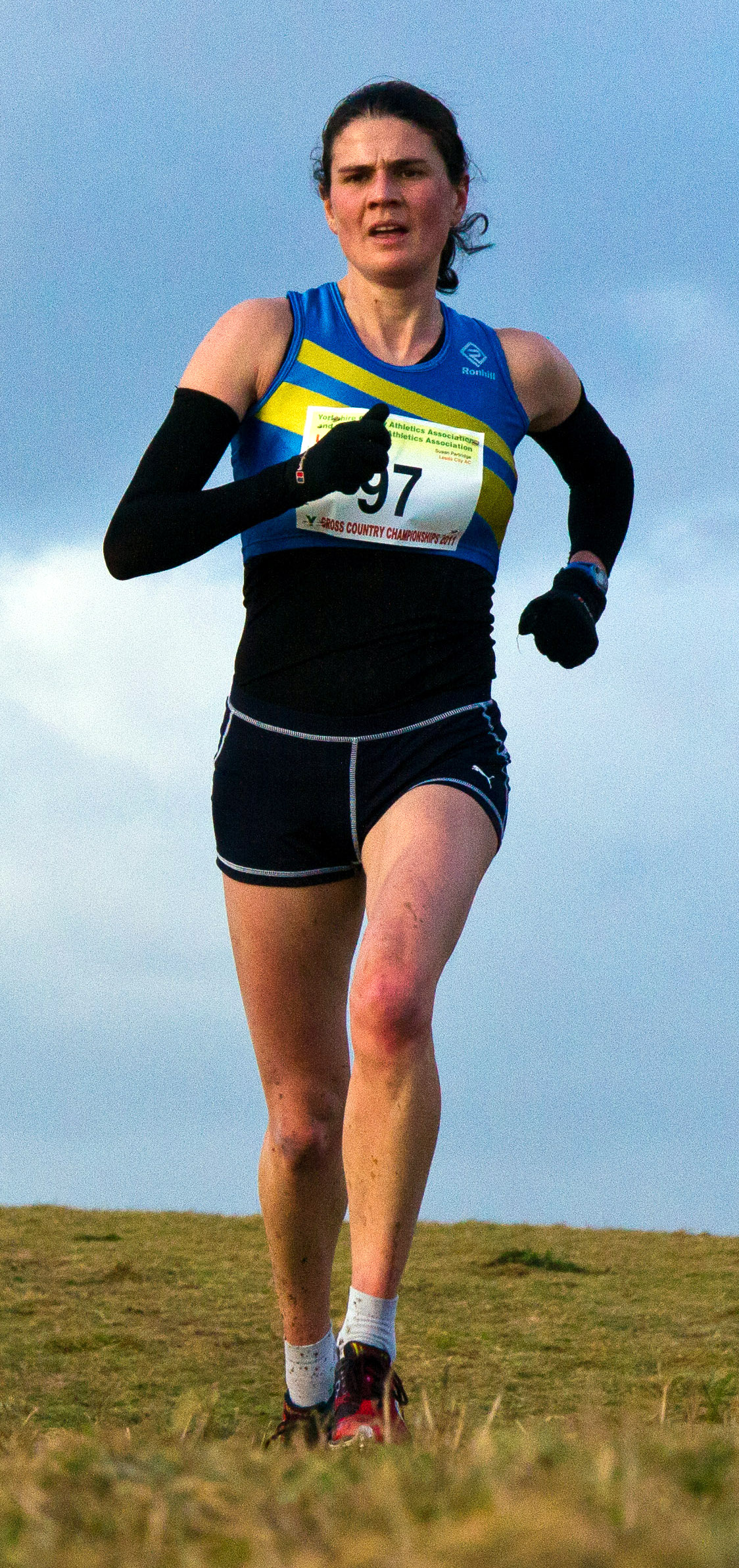
Partridge at the Yorkshire Cross Country Championships in 2011

Susan Partridge (born 4 January 1980) is a British long-distance runner who competes in marathon races. Her personal best for the distance is 2:30:46 hours. She has represented Britain in the marathon at the European Athletics Championships and the World Championships in Athletics, as well as competing for Scotland at the Commonwealth Games.

== Biography ==
Raised in Oban in Scotland, she made her first international outings for Great Britain in cross country running, placing 32nd in the junior race at the 1998 European Cross Country Championships, then 89th in the junior section of the 1999 IAAF World Cross Country Championships. She is a two-time Scottish national cross country champion, having won in 2003 and 2008.

In April 2004 she made her marathon debut at the London Marathon and came in 20th place with a time of 2:41:44 hours. She also came fourth at the Rotterdam Half Marathon that year. The following year she started with a win at the Bath Half Marathon then returned to the London Marathon to improve her time to 2:37:50 hours for 15th. She was selected for the 2005 IAAF World Half Marathon Championships and was 25th, helping the British women to fifth in the team rankings. In 2006, she finished as runner-up at the Barcelona Half Marathon before going on to make her international debut for Scotland at the 2006 Commonwealth Games, where she came tenth. Her second major outing of the year came at the inaugural 2006 IAAF World Road Running Championships over 20 km and she took 27th place.

Partridge focused on road races in the 2007 season and highlights included a fifth-place finish at the Great Scottish Run, sixth at the Great North Run and sixth at the Dublin Marathon. Her performances declined over 2008 and 2009 but she marked a return to form at the 2009 Birmingham Half Marathon in October, which she won in a course record time of 72:50 minutes. She won the 2010 Reading Half Marathon and ran a personal best of 2:35:57 hours for 17th at the 2010 London Marathon. After wins at the Mansfield Half Marathon and Great North 10K, she represented Britain at the 2010 European Championships Marathon, taking 16th place and winning the team bronze medal in the European Marathon Cup. Later that year she had her second career win at the Birmingham Half Marathon.

At the 2011 London Marathon she improved her personal best to 2:34:13 hours. This gained her a place on the British team for the 2011 World Championships Marathon and she was the first Briton home in 24th place after 2:35:57 hours. She managed third place at the end of year San Silvestre Vallecana in Spain, being the first European to finish.

== Achievements ==
Year	Competition	Venue	Position	Event	Notes
2014	Reading Half Marathon	Reading, United Kingdom	1st	Half marathon	1:12:18
2014	Great North Run	Newcastle upon Tyne, United Kingdom	10th	Half marathon	1:12:28
2014	World Half Marathon Championships	Copenhagen, Denmark	40th	Half marathon	1:13:16
2014	Commonwealth Games	Glasgow, United Kingdom	6th	Marathon	2:32:18
2013	Bath Half Marathon	Bath, United Kingdom	2nd	Half marathon	1:10:32
2013	World Championships	Moscow, Russia	10th	Marathon	2:36:24
2012	World Half Marathon Championships	Kavarna, Bulgaria	22nd	Half marathon	1:13:55
2012	Cardiff Half Marathon	Cardiff, United Kingdom	1st	Half marathon	1:11:10
2011	World Championships	Daegu, South Korea	24th	Marathon	2:35:57
2010	Reading Half Marathon	Reading, United Kingdom	1st	Half marathon	1:12:47
2010	Great Birmingham Run	Birmingham, United Kingdom	1st	Half marathon	1:13:56
2010	European Championships	Barcelona, Spain	13th	Marathon	2:39:07
2009	Great Birmingham Run	Birmingham, United Kingdom	1st	Half marathon	1:12:50
2006	Commonwealth Games	Melbourne, Australia	10th	Marathon	2:39:54
2005	World Half Marathon Championships	Edmonton, Canada	25th	Half marathon	1:13:49
2005	Bath Half Marathon	Bath, United Kingdom	1st	Half marathon	1:13:10
