= Vincent Le Dauphin =

French steeplechase runner

Personal information
- Born: 28 June 1976 (age 50) Saint-Brieuc, France
- Height: 190 cm (6 ft 3 in)
- Weight: 71 kg (157 lb)

Sport
- Country: France
- Sport: Athletics (track and field)
- Event: 3000 m steeplechase
- Club: Union Association Côtes d'Armor
- Coached by: Patrice Binelli

Vincent Le Dauphin (born 28 June 1976 in Saint-Brieuc) is a retired French athlete who specialised in the 3000 metres steeplechase. He finished tenth at the 2004 Summer Olympics.

== Competition record ==
Year	Competition	Venue	Position	Event	Notes
Representing France
1995	European Junior Championships	Nyíregyháza, Hungary	12th	3000 m s'chase	9:34.50
1997	European U23 Championships	Turku, Finland	2nd	3000 m s'chase	8:36.92
1998	European Championships	Budapest, Hungary	14th (h)	3000 m s'chase	8:29.08
1999	World Championships	Seville, Spain	33rd (h)	3000 m s'chase	8:44.60
2001	Jeux de la Francophonie	Ottawa, Canada	6th	3000 m s'chase	8:45.65
2002	European Championships	Munich, Germany	9th	3000 m s'chase	8:40.39
2003	World Championships	Paris, France	31st (h)	3000 m s'chase	8:36.42
2004	Olympic Games	Athens, Greece	10th	3000 m s'chase	8:16.15
2005	European Indoor Championships	Madrid, Spain	14th (h)	3000 m	8:00.07
2005	World Championships	Helsinki, Finland	26th (h)	3000 m s'chase	8:30.42
2006	World Indoor Championships	Moscow, Russia	15th (h)	3000 m	7:58.60
2006	European Championships	Gothenburg, Sweden	–	3000 m s'chase	DNF

== Personal bests ==
Outdoor

- 1500 metres – 3:44.79 (1997)
- 3000 metres – 8:11.33 (La Roche-sur-Yon 2002)
- 5000 metres – 14:12.41 (Reims 2002)
- 3000 metres steeplechase – 8:15.76 (Saint-Denis 1999)

Indoor

- 1500 metres – 3:44.05 (Ghent 2005)
- 3000 metres – 7:51.91 (Stuttgart 2006)
