= Great Australian Run =

Road running race

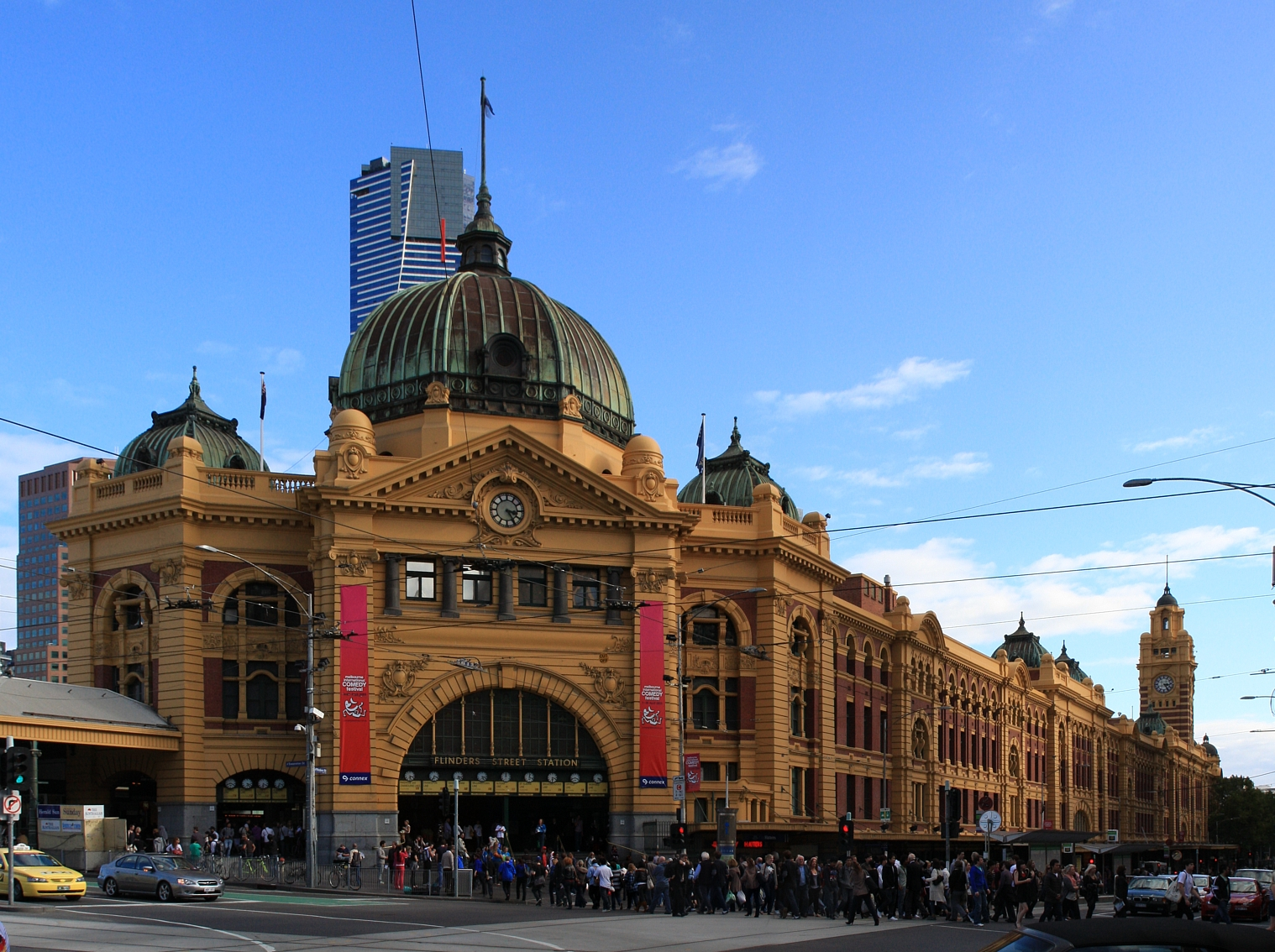
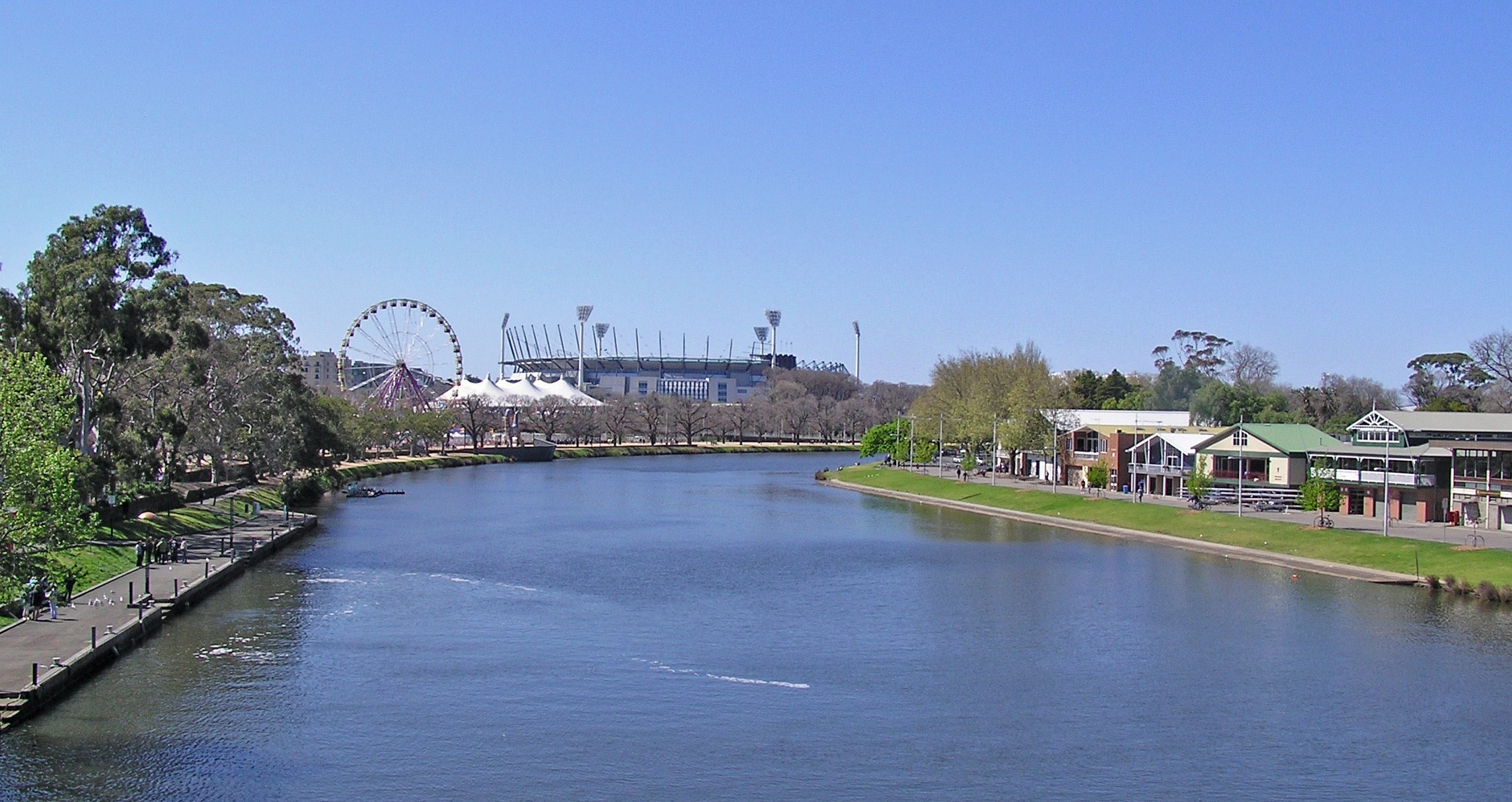
The course passes both Flinders Street station and the Yarra River

The Great Australian Run is an annual 15 kilometres road running race which normally takes place in November in Melbourne, Australia. First held in 2008, it is an international version of the British-based Great Run series.

The race featured over 4000 competitors at its inaugural edition, and also succeeded in attracting high-calibre elite athletes such as marathon world record breakers Haile Gebrselassie and Catherine Ndereba, as well as Australian 2008 Olympians Craig Mottram and Benita Johnson. The competition is broadcast live on Channel Ten. A complementary 10 km wheelchair race first took place at the 2009 competition.

The course of the race, which passes the IAAF's world record standards, begins and ends in Albert Park and passes many of Melbourne's touristic landmarks, including the Yarra River and Flinders Street station. The course, which follows a double-looped circuit style, heads north from Albert Park before switching back in a south-easterly direction through the Royal Botanic Gardens. It passes the Fawkner Park as it heads further south, and finally turns back northwards to complete the circuit in Albert Park.

The race has also served as the Australian road running championships, with Collis Birmingham and Nikki Chapple taking the national titles in 2009.

In 2011, it was renamed City2Bay and took place 9 January 2011. The new course started from Docklands Stadium and ended in St Kilda.

== Past winners ==
Key: Course record Australian Road Championship race

Edition	Year	Men's winner	Time (m:s)	Women's winner	Time (m:s)
I	2008	Haile Gebrselassie (ETH)	42:40	Catherine Ndereba (KEN)	50:43
II	2009	Günther Weidlinger (AUT)	43:01	Nikki Chapple (AUS)	50:18
