= 2008 African Championships in Athletics – Women's 5000 metres =

The women's 5000 metres event at the 2008 African Championships in Athletics was held at the Addis Ababa Stadium on May 1.

== Results ==
Rank	Name	Nationality	Time	Notes
1st place, gold medalist(s)	Meselech Melkamu	Ethiopia	15:49.81	
2nd place, silver medalist(s)	Meseret Defar	Ethiopia	15:50.19	
3rd place, bronze medalist(s)	Grace Momanyi	Kenya	15:50.19	
4	Belaynesh Fikadu	Ethiopia	15:50.49	
5	Veronica Nyaruai	Kenya	15:53.55	
6	Esther Chemtai	Kenya	16:00.39	
7	Angeline Nyiransabimana	Rwanda	16:43.23	
8	Thérèse Ngono Etoundi	Cameroon	17:44.38	
9	Lucia Chandamale	Malawi	18:50.18	
10	Godelieve Nizigiyimana	Burundi	18:55.80	
	Zintle Xiniwe	South Africa	DNF	
	Francine Nzilampa	Democratic Republic of the Congo	DNS	
