= The Great Run Company =

United Kingdom events company

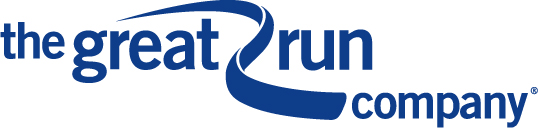
The Great Run Company logo

The Great Run Company is a United Kingdom events company specialising in the development, design, organisation and rights management of mass participation and televised sporting events. They most notably organise the Great North Run, Great South Run and Great Manchester Run annually. They are formally known as Nova International.

The business is headed up by chief executive Paul Foster, while founder Brendan Foster is the company's chairman.

== History ==
The Great North Run was the first event in the Great Run stable, in 1981, and pre-dates Nova International and The Great Run Company by seven years.

Former European and Commonwealth champion Brendan Foster was inspired to organise an event in his native North-East England, after taking part in the Round the Bays event in Auckland, New Zealand. The first Great North Run, the original flagship Great Run, was staged in 1981 and has now grown into the world’s greatest half marathon and the UK’s biggest running event with 57,000 runners.

In 1988, Nova International Ltd was established to manage all Great Run assets as well as its own film department FilmNova and its sportswear brand View From.

From its flagship event, the company has grown to consist of a portfolio of events that now extend over multiple days and include not just mass participation events but family activity, with elite competition on the Great CityGames track and associated Great Swim and Great Cycle events.

In 2014 the Great North Run became the first event in the world to be officially recognised by the IAAF for achieving the milestone one millionth finish. The Great North Run millionth celebration, as part of the Great North Run Cultural Programme was a defining moment for the whole programme of events as consumer research showed that over 3 million participants had taken part in Great Run events since the first Great North Run in 1981.

Using this research and working with M&C Saatchi, Nova positioned and started to market Great Run as the World’s Favourite Run. To further reinforce the success of Great Run and the focus on the consumer brand, Nova changed the company name in March 2015 from Nova International to The Great Run Company.
