= Freya Ross =

Scottish long-distance runner

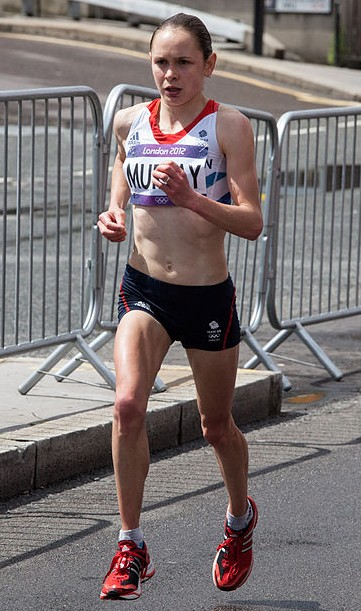
- Freya Ross in the Marathon at the 2012 Olympics in London

Personal information
- Born: 20 September 1983 (age 42)
- Height: 1.58 m (5 ft 2 in)
- Weight: 44 kg (97 lb)

Sport
- Country: United Kingdom
- Sport: Athletics
- Event: Marathon

Freya Ross (née Murray, born 20 September 1983) is a Scottish long-distance runner who competed in the Marathon at the London 2012 Olympics. She mainly competed in road races, but was also successful on the track competing in 5000 metres and 10,000 metres, as well as cross country running. Ross represented Scotland in the 5,000 metres and 10,000 metres in the 2010 Commonwealth Games. in Delhi in October 2010. Some of her best road racing results were from 2009 and 2010 when she won the Great Ireland Run in 2010 and the Great Yorkshire Run in both 2009 and 2010 setting the course record in 2009. In February 2012, Freya won the Scottish Athletics National Cross Country for the sixth time in seven years.

Freya was the second fastest British woman at the 2012 Virgin London Marathon in her first marathon while aiming to qualify for the 2012 Olympics. She was subsequently awarded a place due to the withdrawal of the injured Paula Radcliffe. She was the first British athlete home in 44th place in a time of 2:32:14.

She wrote a recipe book titled 'Food on the Run' detailing her diet as a runner. Much of it written while resting with injuries, it included meals she described as healthy but accessible and affordable.

Freya lives in Larbert, Scotland with her husband and daughter and works as an Event Coordinator. She previously worked as a structural engineer for Cundall LLP, before a spell as a full-time athlete.

Freya received an Honorary Doctorate from Heriot-Watt University in 2014.

== Personal bests ==
- 1500 metres – 4:15.85 min (2005)
- 3000 metres – 9:08.97 min (2009)
- 5000 metres – 15:26.5 min (2010)
- 10,000 metres – 32:23.44 min (2010)
- 10k road - 32:28 min (2009) (Sheffield)
- Half marathon - 1 hour 11 min 51 seconds (2013) (Glasgow)
- Marathon – 2 hours 28 min 12 seconds (2012) (London)
