= Great Yorkshire Run =

Annual 10K foot race in England

The Great Yorkshire Run is an annual 10K run road race previously held in September in Sheffield City Centre, England, and now held in July in Harrogate, North Yorkshire. It is a part of the Great Run series of events, and as such is linked with the Great North Run. It was run for the first time in 2007, and was run over a weekend, with the mini (3–8-year-olds) race at 2 km and the Junior (9–14-year-olds) race at 3 km taking place on 6 September at Don Valley Stadium, with the full 10 km Great Yorkshire Run taking place on the Sunday. It was formerly supported by the city development company Creative Sheffield, and the regional development agency Yorkshire Forward. From July 2016, the Great Yorkshire Run is now sponsored by Theakston Brewery and is referred to as the Great Yorkshire Run - Harrogate in association with Theakston.

== Past winners ==
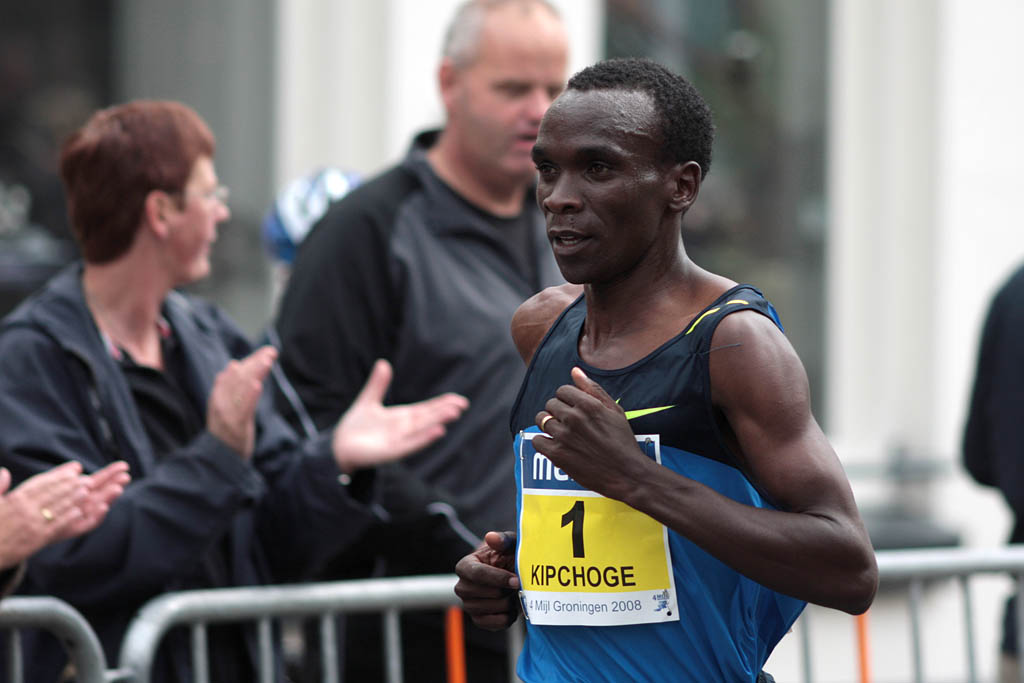
Kenyan Eliud Kipchoge set a course record to win in 2009.

Key: Course record

Edition	Year	Men's winner	Time (h:m:s)	Women's winner	Time (h:m:s)
1st	2007	John Kibowen (KEN)	29:40	Benita Johnson (AUS)	32:55
2nd	2008	Mustafa Mohamed (SWE)	29:10	Grace Momanyi (KEN)	32:44
3rd	2009	Eliud Kipchoge (KEN)	28:30	Freya Murray (GBR)	32:28
4th	2010	Craig Mottram (AUS)	28:50	Freya Murray (GBR)	33:01
5th	2011	Micah Kogo (KEN)	28:45	Gemma Steel (GBR)	32.52
6th	2012	Jonathan Mellor (GBR)	29:24	Gemma Steel (GBR)	33:12
7th	2013	Ryan McLeod (GBR)	29:40	Gemma Steel (GBR)	32:20
8th	2014	Ross Millington (GBR)	30:20	Gemma Steel (GBR)	33:19
9th	2015	Jonny Mellor (GBR)	29:12	Lauren Howarth (GBR)	33:49
10th	2016	Jason Cherriman (GBR)	32:56	Sharon Barlow (GBR)	37:14
