= Great South Run =

Race in Portsmouth, England

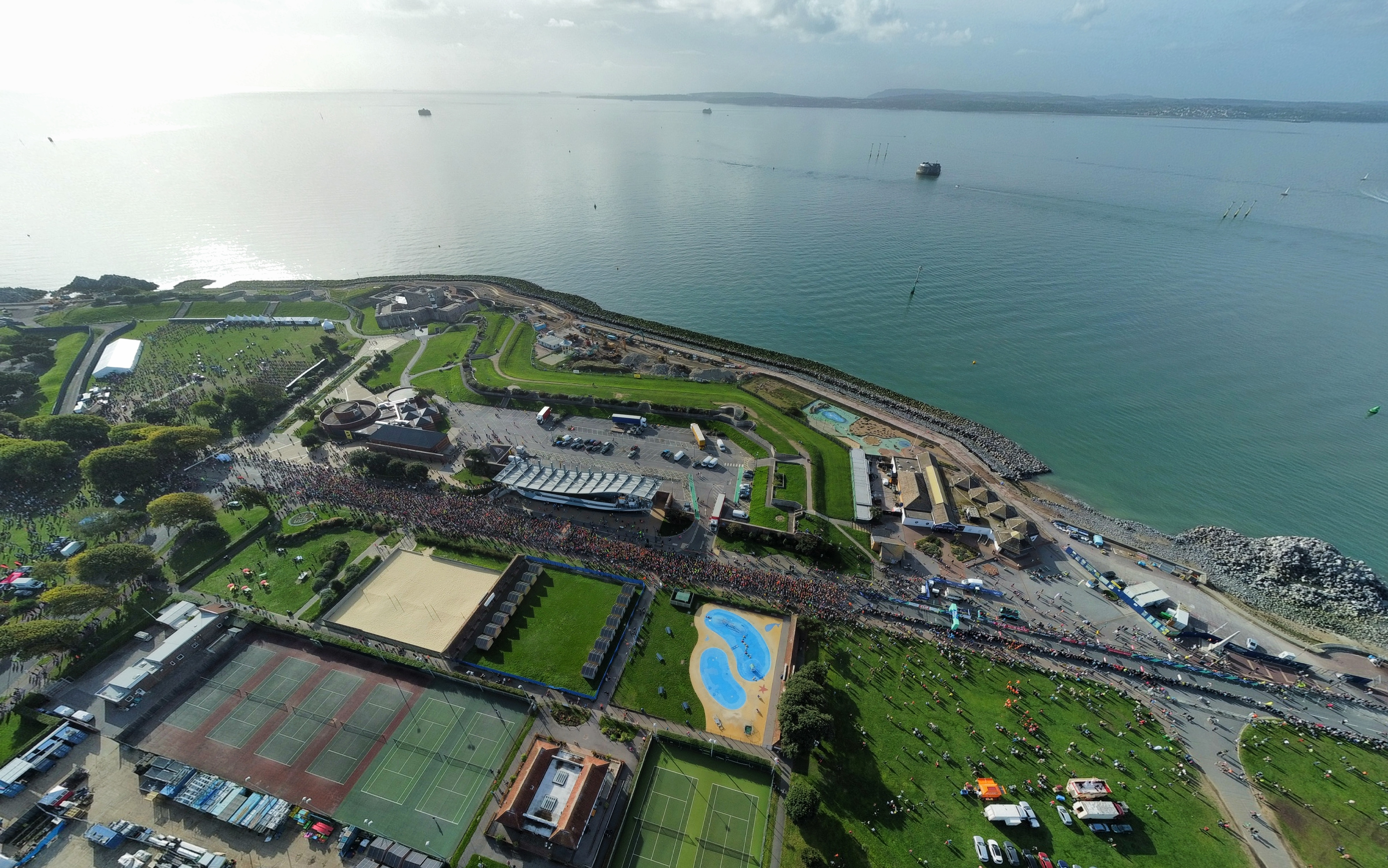
- Date: Mid-October
- Location: Portsmouth, United Kingdom
- Event type: Road
- Distance: 10 mile (16.09 km)
- Primary sponsor: AJ Bell
- Established: 1990
- Course records: Men: (Kenya) Joseph Ebuya 45:15; Women: (United Kingdom) Eilish McColgan 50:43
- Website: Great South Run

2017 Finishers Great South Run medal

The Great South Run is an annual 10 mile (16.09 km) road running race which takes place in Portsmouth, United Kingdom providing an intermediate distance between the ten kilometre and the half marathon (21.097 km) runs. Launched in 1990, it is part of the Great Run series created by former British athlete Brendan Foster. It was originally held in Southampton, but the race moved to its current course after the first edition.

The Great South Run has become one of Europe's most popular mass participation races over 10 miles, with a record 21,000 entries for the 2009 race. Although the elite race is an IAAF Gold Label Road Race which attracts some of the most successful professional runners, it is not a recognised distance for purposes of IAAF records. World record holder Paula Radcliffe and 2007 World Champion Luke Kibet are among the past winners. The event is currently sponsored by AJ Bell. Previous sponsors have been ExpressTest by Cignpost Diagnostics (2021), Simplyhealth (2017–2019), Morrisons (2015), Bupa (1993–2014) and Diet Coke (1990–1992). The 2016 and 2022 races did not have a major sponsor.

The 1999 edition of the race was selected to be the Amateur Athletic Association 10-mile championships that year. In 2021, British runner Eilish McColgan set the current women's record of 50:42. Paula Radcliffe won the women's race in 2008 in a time of 51 minutes 11 seconds, a new British record. Kenyan runner Joseph Ebuya won the 2010 edition in 45:15 minutes, which was a significant improvement upon the previous UK all-comers record held by the 1995 winner Benson Masya.

Channel 5 broadcast the Great South Run every year until 2019. The event is currently untelevised.

The 2026 Great South Run took place on 18th October.

== Past winners ==
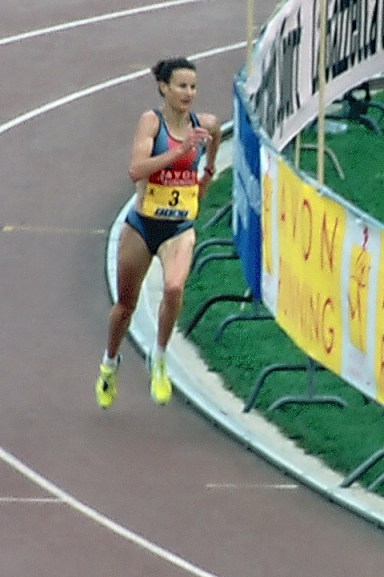
Previous course record holder Sonia O'Sullivan took consecutive wins in 2002–2003.

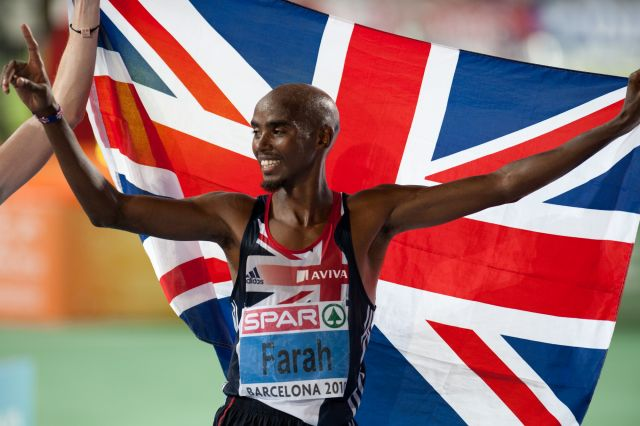
Mo Farah won the race in 2009.

Key: Course record

Edition	Year	Date	Men's winner	Time (m:s)	Women's winner	Time (m:s)
1st	1990		Marti ten Kate (NED)	47:52	Alison Gooderham (GBR)	56:09
2nd	1991		Thomas Naali (TAN)	47:11	Olga Bondarenko (URS)	53:16
3rd	1992		Boay Akonay (TAN)	47:04	Iulia Negura (ROM)	53:19
4th	1993		Gary Staines (GBR)	46:11	Iulia Negura (ROM)	53:01
5th	1994		Gary Staines (GBR)	47:00	Gitte Karlshøj (DEN)	54:49
6th	1995		Benson Masya (KEN)	45:56	Liz McColgan (GBR)	53:12
7th	1996		Gary Staines (GBR)	46:57	Derartu Tulu (ETH)	52:39
8th	1997		Christopher Kelong (KEN)	46:53	Liz McColgan (GBR)	52:00
9th	1998		Stéphane Franke (GER)	47:40	Marian Sutton (GBR)	54:17
10th	1999	19 September	Simon Kasimili (KEN)	47:42	Esther Kiplagat (KEN)	54:42
11th	2000	26 November (rescheduled after event postponed in September due to flooding and fuel protests)	Gert Thys (RSA)	48:26	Restituta Joseph (TAN)	55:10
12th	2001	14 October	Khalid Skah (MAR)	46:17	Restituta Joseph (TAN)	52:36
13th	2002	8 September	Simon Kasimili (KEN)	47:27	Sonia O'Sullivan (IRL)	51:00
14th	2003	12 October	John Yuda (TAN)	46:35	Sonia O'Sullivan (IRL)	53:26
15th	2004	10 October	Hendrick Ramaala (RSA)	47:14	Benita Johnson (AUS)	52:32
16th	2005	9 October	John Yuda (TAN)	46:45	Derartu Tulu (ETH)	51:27
17th	2006	22 October	Simon Arusei (KEN)	47:17	Jo Pavey (GBR)	52:46
18th	2007	28 October	Luke Kibet (KEN)	47:31	Rose Cheruiyot (KEN)	53:44
19th	2008		Bernard Kipyego (KEN)	46:42	Paula Radcliffe (GBR)	51:11
20th	2009		Mo Farah (GBR)	46:25	Inês Monteiro (POR)	52:32
21st	2010		Joseph Ebuya (KEN)	45:15	Grace Momanyi (KEN)	52:03
22nd	2011		Leonard Komon (KEN)	46:18	Aselefech Mergia (ETH)	52:55
23rd	2012		Stephen Mokoka (RSA)	46:40	Jo Pavey (GRB)	53:01
24th	2013		Emmanuel Bett (KEN)	48:03	Florence Kiplagat (KEN)	53:53
25th	2014		James Rungaru (KEN)	46:31	Belaynesh Oljira (ETH)	52:40
26th	2015		Moses Kipsiro (UGA)	46:00	Vivian Cheruiyot (KEN)	51:17
27th	2016		Chris Thompson (GBR)	47:23	Tirunesh Dibaba (ETH)	51:49
28th	2017		Chris Thompson (GBR)	48:32	Gemma Steel (GBR)	55:25
29th	2018		Chris Thompson (GBR)	46:56	Eilish McColgan (GBR)	54:43
30th	2019		Marc Scott (GBR)	46:57	Eilish McColgan (GBR)	51:38
	2020		Event cancelled due to COVID-19			
31st	2021		Jack Rowe (GBR)	47:20	Eilish McColgan (GBR)	50:43
32nd	2022		Ben Connor (GBR)	47:19	Lily Partridge (GBR)	54:29
33rd	2023		Zak Mahamed (GBR)	46:41	Lily Partridge (GBR)	54:05
	2024		Event cancelled due to high winds and rain			
34th	2025		Marc Scott (GBR)	47:21	Verity Ockenden (GBR)	56:37
35th	2026		Kadar Omar (ETH)	47:26	Hannah Irwin (GBR)	53:34
