= Chris Thompson (runner) =

British long-distance runner (born 1981)

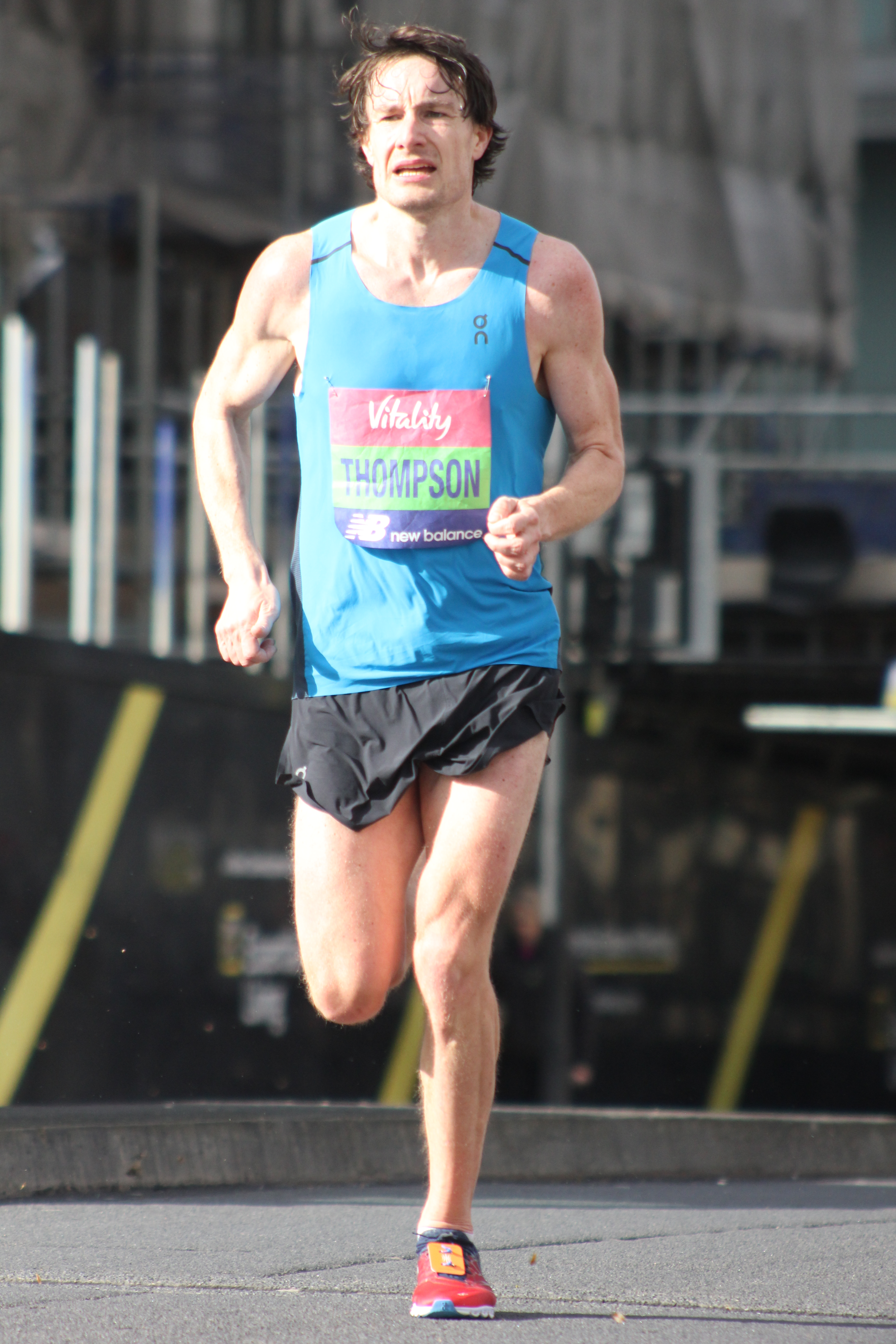
- Chris Thompson running to 5th place in 2019 London Half Marathon

Personal information
- Nationality: British (English)
- Born: 17 April 1981 (age 45) Barrow-in-Furness, England
- Height: 178 cm (5 ft 10 in)
- Weight: 67 kg (148 lb)

Sport
- Sport: Men's athletics
- Events: 1500 m, 3000 m, 5000 m, 10,000 m
- Club: Aldershot, Farnham & District AC
- Coached by: Alan Storey

Achievements and titles
- Personal bests: 1500 m: 3:41.04 3000 m: 7:43.34; 5000 m: 13:11.51 10,000 m: 27:27.36
Medal record
European Championships
Silver medal – second place	2010 Barcelona	10,000 m

Christopher Peter Thompson (born 17 April 1981) is a British former long-distance runner, who won the silver medal in the 10,000 metres at the 2010 European Athletics Championships in Barcelona, on 27 July 2010 behind his compatriot Mo Farah. He competed at the 2012 Summer Olympics and the 2020 Summer Olympics.

== Biography ==
Thompson won the European U23 5000 m Championship in 2003.

Coached by Alan Storey, Thompson ran at the 2010 Great Yorkshire Run in September and came close to victory, but was edged out by a second by Australian Craig Mottram. He took on top African runners at the 2010 Commonwealth Games, but he could not repeat his podium performance of Barcelona; he finished in fifth place behind Ugandan winner Moses Kipsiro and the Kenyan team, making him the top non-African performer in the event.

At the start of the 2011 track season Thompson ran the third fastest 10,000 m by a Briton with his time of 27:27.36 minutes at the Payton Jordan Invitational in Stanford, California. He was the sole runner to challenge Haile Gebrselassie at the Great Manchester Run in May and finished as runner-up to the decorated Ethiopian. A heel injury interrupted his season and eventually ruled him out of competing at the 2011 World Championships in Athletics. He returned to action in October at the Great South Run. At the 10-mile Portsmouth race he started quickly, but faded badly in the latter stages and ended up fourth. He praised the sensible pacing of Alistair Cragg (who overtook him for third place) and remarked "I didn't respect the course with my ambitions...I've learned a lesson about road running for the future".

He ran his first half marathon at the start of 2012, placing seventh at the New York Half Marathon in a time of 61:23 minutes. He came fourth at the Payton Jordan 5000 m and represented the hosts in the 10,000 metres event at the 2012 London Olympics, managing only 25th place after an injury interrupted season. His last outing of the year was sixth at the Great North Run. He was not selected for the 2013 World Championships in Athletics the following year, although he had season's bests of 13:24.06 minutes and 27:40.81 minutes on the track. On the roads he came fifth at the Great Scottish Run and was second at the Great Birmingham Run.

On 22 September 2013, Thompson was crowned 'King of Richmond' beating Andy Vernon in the Kew Gardens 10k at the inaugural Richmond Running Festival.

On 13 April 2014 Thompson came 11th in the 2014 London Marathon with a race time of 2 hours 11 minutes and 19 seconds and at the 2015 Great Birmingham run, Thompson won a closely contested race finishing the half-marathon in a time of 01:03:00 signalling that his persistent calf injury had finally healed.

Thompson won the 2019 Bath half marathon, finishing with a time of 01:03:09 and finished second in the 2020 The Vitality Big Half with a time of 1:01:07 (following Kenenisa Bekele's 1:00:22 course record time).

Thompson qualified for the marathon event at the delayed 2020 Summer Olympics, after winning the British Marathon Trials at Kew Gardens in London in March 2021

Thompson was twice British 5000 metres champion after winning the British AAA Championships title in 2004 and the British Athletics Championships in 2010.

Thompson announced his retirement as an elite runner in October 2024.
