= Great Swim =

National open water swimming event in the United Kingdom

- Event Name: Great Swim
- Dates: June - August
- Locations: Windermere, Suffolk, Loch Lomond, London
- Type: Swim
- Distances: 1/2 Mile, 1 Mile, 2 Miles, 5KM
- Established: 2008
- Website: greatswim.org

The Great Swim is a national open water swimming event in the United Kingdom, which has had over 22,000 participants. The event was started in 2008 with a one-mile Great North Swim in Windermere. Taking its inspiration from the world's biggest half marathon the Great North Run, Great Swim uses the formula of mass participation events to provide a focus and a challenge for which the individual can train.

Most events feature an elite race for women and another elite race for men, combined with a series of "waves" of other swimmers with up to 200 swimmers in each wave. The course is GPS calibrated to ensure that the exact distance is covered and each competitor is electronically timed, either with a chip strapped to the ankle, or with chips stuck on the cap issued to each swimmer.

Although not specifically a charity swim, many participants have raised money for a range of charities. Specific charity partners are nominated for each event (and sometimes are able to provide entries) but no restrictions are in place around fund-raising.

== History ==
=== 2008 ===
On 14 September 2008, the first Great North Swim took place, which attracted over 2,200 swimmers of all ages and abilities, including five of the six Olympic Open Water Medalists: David Davies, Cassandra Patten, Maarten van der Weijden, Keri-anne Payne and Thomas Lurz. Larisa Ilchenko was the only Olympic Open Water Medalist who did not attend.

=== 2009 ===
The next year, after the success of the inaugural Great North Swim, the series was expanded to 4 events:

- The Great London Swim which took place for the first time on 15 August 2009 in Royal Victoria Dock
- The Great Scottish Swim which took place on Saturday 29 August 2009 at Strathclyde Park
- The Great North Swim on 12 and 13 September 2009 at Lake Windermere
- The Great East Swim on Saturday 26 September in Alton Water

This time around, the Great North Swim attracted a record 6,000 participants and up to 20,000 spectators, including Andy Burnham, Steve McFadden, and other Olympic champions. The event also provided a boost to the local economy.

=== 2010 ===
In 2010, the Great Swim acquired its first sponsor, British Gas. British Gas also went on to sponsor the Great Swim in 2011 and 2012. The Great Salford Swim was also added to the series, though the Great North Swim (planned to take place on the weekend of September 4 and 5) and Great Scottish Swim ended up being cancelled due to the presence of blue-green algae at both sites, leaving several thousand swimmers disappointed. Richard Leafe - the Lake District National Park Authority chief later pledged to fix the water quality issues. All events that year were televised on Channel 4 with hour shows dedicated to each event with extended coverage of the elite races. In addition, 500m swims have been added to the program at some venues as well as a 2-mile swim which was called The Great North Swim the Extra Mile when introduced in Windermere.

=== 2011 ===
British Gas sponsored all 2011 Great Swims. 10,000 swimmers sign up to the Great North Swim, held over 3 days and included two mile, one mile and half mile events. The Great Salford Swim was shown live on BBC that year but has since been re-branded as The Great Manchester Swim (although still taking place at the same venue).

=== 2012 ===
British Gas sponsored all 2012 Great Swims. The Great Scottish swim of 2012 was planned to take place in Strathclyde Park, but also cancelled due to poor water quality leading up to the event, which was compounded by the heavy rainfall which pushed bacteria levels above the safe limit. The backup venue also had unacceptable water quality due to naturally occurring blue-green algae.

=== 2013 ===
In 2013, none of the Great Swims were sponsored. After a further cancellation of the Great Scottish Swim in 2012, a new venue, Loch Lomond, was chosen as the venue for the event for 2013.

=== 2014 ===
In 2014, none of the Great Swims were sponsored.

=== 2015 ===
In 2015, none of the Great Swims were sponsored.

=== 2016 ===
In 2016, none of the Great Swims were sponsored.

=== 2017 ===
The Great Manchester Swim was cancelled from 2017.

=== 2018 ===
For the first time, the Great North Swim was hosted at Brockhole, Windermere. The swim went smoothly, with director Alex Jackson estimating that 30,000 people visited the event site over the weekend.

=== 2020 ===
Due to the COVID-19 pandemic, all great swims in 2020 were cancelled.

=== 2021 ===
Once again due to the pandemic, the Great East Swim was cancelled.

=== 2022 ===
Despite high winds causing the Great North Swim to be cancelled on Saturday 11 June, the Sunday swim went well. The Great East Swim was cancelled from 2022 onward, due to the pandemic cancellations of the previous two years and "ongoing challenges with blue-green algae".

=== 2024 ===
The Great North swim is scheduled to take place on 7–9 June. To help participants prepare, an extra "shakeout" swim was held on the 22 March.

== See also ==
- Great Run
