= Ben Whitby =

British track and field athlete (born 1977)

Personal information
- Nationality: British (English)
- Born: 6 January 1977 (age 48) Wandsworth, London, England

Sport
- Sport: Athletics
- Event: Steeplechase
- Club: Windsor, Slough, Eton & Hounslow AC

Benedict Carl Whitby (born 1977), is a male former athlete who competed for England.

== Biography ==
Whitby became the British champion in 2001 and 2002 after winning the British 3,000 metres steeplechase title.

He represented England in the 3,000 metres steeplechase event, at the 1998 Commonwealth Games in Kuala Lumpur, Malaysia. Four years later he represented England again at the 2002 Commonwealth Games.
