= Simplyhealth =

Health insurer in the United Kingdom

- Industry: Health Insurance
- Predecessors: Hospital Saving Association; Manchester & Salford Hospital Saturday Fund; Leeds Hospital Fund; Healthcare Insurance Alliance
- Founded: 1872; 154 years ago
- Headquarters: Andover, United Kingdom
- Website: www.simplyhealth.co.uk

Simplyhealth is a provider of health cash plans in the United Kingdom. The scheme is an amalgamation of a number of schemes, with the earliest dating from 1872. Members can claim back cash costs from various services from the NHS or private provision, such as dental care, optical care, prescriptions and physiotherapy, as well as having access to services such as remote telehealth consultations with a general practitioner.

== History ==
=== Foundation to the early NHS ===
The first element of what is now Simplyhealth was the separate formation of the Manchester & Salford Hospital Saturday Fund and the Leeds Hospital Fund, which were both constituted in 1872. Both organisations followed a similar 'hospital Saturday' approach in fundraising for their local hospital. These were named Saturday funds, as this was traditionally payday for workers, when they could make their contributions to the hospital.

The Hospital Saving Association (HSA) was founded in London on 11 July 1922, focused on providing cover for working people, with both member and their employer contributing. The association was formed as limited liability, but non-profit. Those taking part in the scheme were exempted from charges at the London Hospital (now the Royal London Hospital) and other voluntary hospitals taking part in the scheme.

By 1944, the HSA had distributed over ten million pounds to hospitals in London.

Following the launch of the National Health Service (NHS) in England in 1948, the schemes evolved, but continued their system of membership and payments. The Health Saving Association was one of only 30, out of more than 250, contributory schemes which continued following the founding of the NHS, albeit with a 30% drop in membership in the following year, down to £1 million.

From 1947, the HSA offered scholarships for trained nurses to improve their skills in areas such as public health, dietician training, and health visiting.

As a non-profit association, the HSA had Queen Elizabeth II as its patron.

=== Mergers and rebranding ===
In 1999, the Manchester & Salford Hospital Saturday Fund merged with the Healthcare Insurance Alliance, and began to trade as HealthSure.

The Health Savings Association (HSA), merged with the Leeds Hospital Fund in 2002.

In 2005, HSA (including the LHF) and HealthSure (including the Manchester & Salford Hospital Saturday Fund and Healthcare Insurance Alliance) all merged, but remained trading as separate companies.

The merger was subject to scrutiny by the Competition and Markets Authority, but was passed, as it was not expected to result in a substantial reduction in competition in the market.

The Simplyhealth brand was introduced in 2009, resulting in the retirement of the legacy brand names such as HSA and HealthSure.

Dental health plan provider Denplan was acquired from AXA in 2011, for the sum of £115m.

The private medical insurance operation of Simplyhealth (as opposed to the cash plans which form the majority of Simplyhealth's business) was sold to AXA PPP in May 2015, along with the Bristol operations of the business, following regulatory approval.

The company took a majority stake in eyecare-specific provider Ocuplan in May 2022.

== Services ==
Simplyhealth's core service is as a provider of health cash plans, where members receive included treatment or cash payment, in return for a monthly fee.

Members also have access to remote telehealth GP consultations through a smartphone app as part of their membership.

== Performance ==
Simplyhealth is the market leader in retail cash plans, with around 60% of the market.

In the corporate market, Simplyhealth is the second largest provider (behind Health Shield), with over 300,000 people covered in 2020.

== Sponsorship ==
In 2017, Simplyhealth was announced as the title sponsor of the Great Run series of running events, including the Great North Run, which is the second largest half-marathon in the world, and became branded the "Simplyhealth Great North Run".

Also in 2017, the Simplyhealth Professionals business launched sponsorship of the 'Boundaries for life' programme, providing health screening at cricket matches.

In 2019 the company became an official partner of England Rugby in a five-year sponsorship deal.

Following the COVID-19 pandemic, Simplyhealth sponsored Sported to support community groups back into activity.

== Corporate social responsibility ==
Simplyhealth became certified as carbon neutral in 2020, and became "carbon neutral +" in 2021. This sustainability initiative also involved becoming certified by the Forest Stewardship Council.

In 2022, it was awarded B corporation status for social and environmental performance.
