= Great Birmingham Run =

Sportsevent in 2008

- Date: 7 May 2022
- Location: Birmingham, United Kingdom
- Event type: Road
- Distance: Half marathon
- Primary sponsor: AJ Bell
- Established: 2008
- Course records: Men: (Kenya) Micah Kogo 60:17; Women: (United Kingdom) Gemma Steel 70:19
- Website: Great Birmingham Run

The Great Birmingham Run is an annual half marathon road running event held in Birmingham, UK in May. Formerly known as the Birmingham Half Marathon, from 2011 it became part of the Great Run series of road races.

Established in 2008, it incorporated the 2009 IAAF World Half Marathon Championships. The 2009 event was televised live on Sky Sports and between 2011 and 2016 the race was televised live in the United Kingdom by Channel 5.

In 2019, the race distance was reduced to 11.07 miles due to a security alert close to Cannon Hill Park.

The 2020 and 2021 editions of the race was cancelled due to the COVID-19 virus.

The race returned in 2022 with the date switched to May, with a 10k race held alongside the half-marathon.

== Winners ==
Key: Course record

Edition	Year	Men's winner	Time (m:s)	Women's winner	Time (m:s)
1st	2008	Andi Jones (GBR)	65:46	Birhan Dagne (GBR)	77:40
2nd	2009	Jean Ndayisenga (BDI)	66:17	Susan Partridge (GBR)	72:50
3rd	2010	Edwin Kipyego (KEN)	63:50	Susan Partridge (GBR)	73:56
4th	2011	Haile Gebrselassie (ETH)	61:29	Gemma Steel (GBR)	72:21
5th	2012	Micah Kogo (KEN)	60:17	Sara Moreira (POR)	72:49
6th	2013	Thomas Ayeko (UGA)	62:32	Gemma Steel (GBR)	70:19
7th	2014	Joel Kimutai (KEN)	61:30	Polline Wanjiku (KEN)	70:48
8th	2015	Chris Thompson (GBR)	63:00	Dominika Napieraj (POL)	73:39
9th	2016	Andy Vernon (GBR)	63:32	Elizeba Cherono (NED)	73:42
10th	2017	William Richardson (GBR)	66:38	Chloe Richardson (GBR)	81:40
11th	2018	Kadar Omar Abdullahi (ART)	66:06	Nicola Sykes (GBR)	79:57
12th	2019	Omar Ahmed (ETH)	52:18 (short course)	Hayley Carruthers (GBR)	62:09 (short course)
13th	2022	Dewi Griffiths (GBR)	65:10	Abigail Halcarz (GBR)	80:03
14th	2023	Omar Ahmed (ETH)	65:23	Hayley Carruthers (GBR)	81:11
15th	2024	Omar Ahmed (ETH)	65:35	Abbey Van Dijk	81:17
16th	2025	Alexander Lanz	68:01	Georgie Campbell	81:22
17th	2026				
