= Great Run =

Road running events in the UK

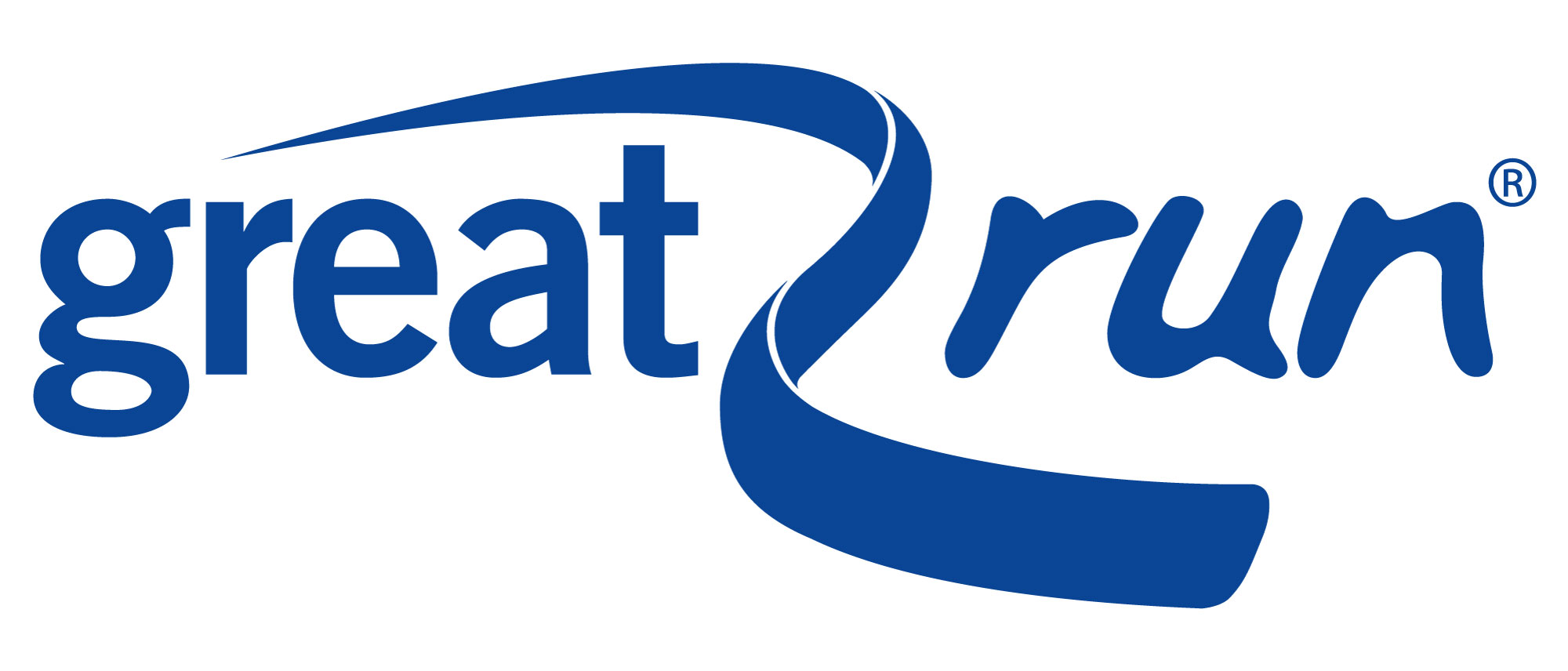
Great Run Logo

Great Run is a series of road running events around the United Kingdom, which includes the Great North Run. Great Run is a part of The Great Run Company, which was launched by retired athlete Brendan Foster. The group specialises in road running events, from a 5k up to a marathon.

Bupa was title partner of the Great Run Series for 18 years, one of Britain’s longest ever sports sponsorship agreements, which ended in 2014. Morrisons took over sponsorship of this series of events in 2015. In 2017, Simplyhealth became title sponsor of the Great Run series of events and following the expiry of the sponsorship, ExpressTest by Cignpost sponsored the 2021 events, and AJ Bell took over in 2023 as part of a five-year deal.

In the early 2000s, the series expanded beyond the UK and established Great Run races in the Republic of Ireland, Ethiopia and Australia.

== Current list of events ==
Event name	Location	Distance	Founded
Great Edinburgh Winter Run	(Scotland) Holyrood Park, Edinburgh	5K	2005
Great Edinburgh XCountry	(Scotland) Holyrood Park, Edinburgh	9K, 4K	2005
Great Ireland Run	(Republic of Ireland) Phoenix Park, Dublin	10K	2003
Great Edinburgh Run	(Scotland) Edinburgh city centre	10 Miles	1993
Great Birmingham 10K	(England) Birmingham city centre	10K	2015
Great Bristol 10K	(England) Bristol city centre	10K	2008
Great Manchester Run	(England) Manchester city centre	Half Marathon, 10K	2003
Great Women's 10K	(Scotland) Glasgow	10K	
Great North 10K	(England) Gateshead	10K	2009
Great Tees 10K	(England) Stockton	10K	2018
Great Newham London Run	(England) Queen Elizabeth Olympic Park, London	10K	2015
Great Newham London Family Run	(England) Queen Elizabeth Olympic Park, London	2K	2015
Great Newham London Marathon Relay	(England) Queen Elizabeth Olympic Park, London	10.54K (Note: per person, in teams of four.)	2015
Great Yorkshire Run	(England) Harrogate	10K	2007
Great Aberdeen Run	(Scotland) Aberdeen	Half Marathon, 10K	2017
Great North 5K	(England) Quayside, Newcastle upon Tyne/Gateshead	5K	
Great North Run	(England) Newcastle upon Tyne-Gateshead-South Shields	Half Marathon	1981
Great Bristol Half Marathon	(England) Bristol city centre	Half Marathon	1989
Great Scottish Run	(Scotland) Glasgow city centre	Half Marathon, 10K	1991
Great Birmingham Run	(England) Birmingham city centre	Half Marathon, 10K	2008
Great East Run	(England) Ipswich city centre	Half Marathon	2017
Great South 5k	(England) Southsea, Portsmouth	5K	
Great South Run	(England) Southsea, Portsmouth	10 Miles	1990
Great Ethiopian Run	(Ethiopia) Addis Ababa	10K	2001

=== Former events ===
- Great Australian Run
- Great Capital Run

== See also ==
- Great Swim
- Great Walks
