= 2012 Doha Diamond League =

- Dates: 11 May 2012
- Host city: Doha, Qatar
- Venue: Suheim bin Hamad Stadium
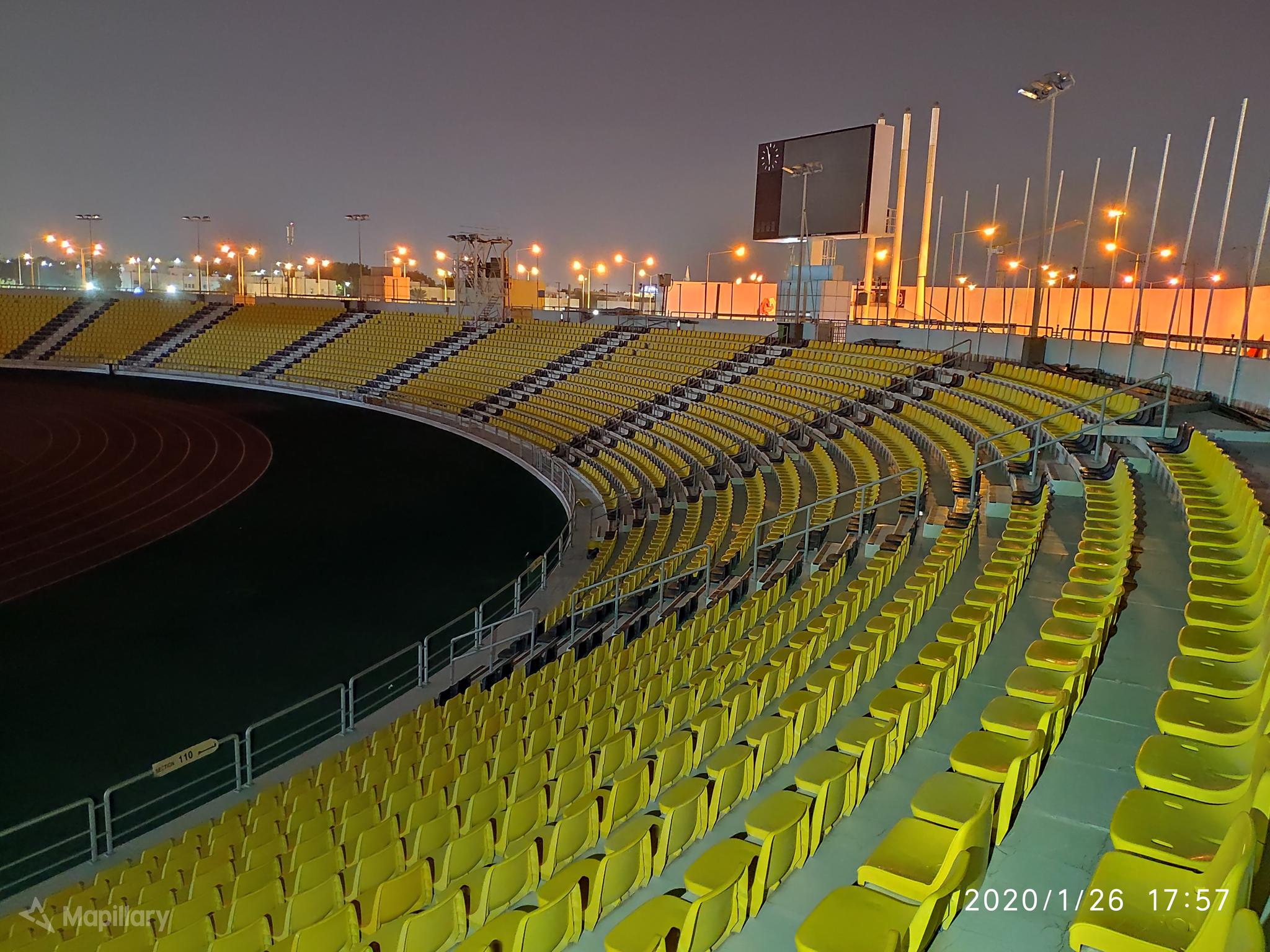
- Level: 2012 Diamond League

The 2012 Doha Diamond League was the 14th edition of the annual outdoor track and field meeting in Doha, Qatar. Held on 11 May at Suheim bin Hamad Stadium, it was the opening leg of the 2012 Diamond League – the highest level international track and field circuit.

== Diamond discipline results ==
Podium finishers earned points towards a season leaderboard (4-2-1 respectively), points per event were then doubled in the Diamond League Finals. Athletes had to take part in the Diamond race during the finals to be eligible to win the Diamond trophy which is awarded to the athlete with the most points at the end of the season.

=== Men's ===
200 Metres
Rank	Athlete	Nation	Time	Points	Notes
1st place, gold medalist(s)	Walter Dix	United States	20.02	4	MR
2nd place, silver medalist(s)	Churandy Martina	Netherlands	20.26	2	SB
3rd place, bronze medalist(s)	Jaysuma Saidy Ndure	Norway	20.34	1	SB
4	Marvin Anderson	Jamaica	20.42		SB
5	Mario Forsythe	Jamaica	20.53		SB
6	Rasheed Dwyer	Jamaica	20.60		SB
7	Aziz Ouhadi	Morocco	20.70		
—	Mookie Salaam	United States	DNF		
			Wind: (−0.5 m/s)		

400 Metres
Rank	Athlete	Nation	Time	Points	Notes
1st place, gold medalist(s)	LaShawn Merritt	United States	44.19	4	MR, WL
2nd place, silver medalist(s)	Luguelín Santos	Dominican Republic	44.88	2	NR
3rd place, bronze medalist(s)	Angelo Taylor	United States	44.97	1	SB
4	Martyn Rooney	Great Britain	44.99		
5	Tabarie Henry	United States Virgin Islands	45.20		SB
6	Rabah Yousif	Sudan	45.42		
7	Calvin Smith Jr.	United States	45.62		
8	Thomas Schneider	Germany	47.12		

1500 Metres
Rank	Athlete	Nation	Time	Points	Notes
1st place, gold medalist(s)	Silas Kiplagat	Kenya	3:29.63	4	WL
2nd place, silver medalist(s)	Asbel Kiprop	Kenya	3:29.78	2	PB
3rd place, bronze medalist(s)	Bethwell Birgen	Kenya	3:31.17	1	PB
4	Nixon Chepseba	Kenya	3:31.32		
5	Collins Cheboi	Kenya	3:32.64		
6	İlham Tanui Özbilen	Turkey	3:33.32		
7	Mekonnen Gebremedhin	Ethiopia	3:33.38		
8	Daniel Kipchirchir Komen	Kenya	3:33.43		
9	Hamza Driouch	Qatar	3:33.69		
10	Elijah Kipchirchir Kiptoo	Kenya	3:33.81		
11	Ryan Gregson	Australia	3:33.92		SB
12	Russell Wolf Brown	United States	3:34.11		PB
13	Abubaker Kaki Khamis	Sudan	3:34.34		
14	Tarek Boukensa	Algeria	3:42.88		
—	Viktor Kipchirchir Kebenei	Kenya	DNF		
—	Vickson Naran Polonet	Kenya	DNF		

3000 Metres
Rank	Athlete	Nation	Time	Notes
1st place, gold medalist(s)	Augustine Kiprono Choge	Kenya	7:30.42	WL
2nd place, silver medalist(s)	Eliud Kipchoge	Kenya	7:31.40	
3rd place, bronze medalist(s)	Moses Ndiema Kipsiro	Uganda	7:31.88	
4	Isiah Koech	Kenya	7:32.43	PB
5	Thomas Longosiwa	Kenya	7:33.68	
6	Edwin Soi	Kenya	7:38.45	
7	Kenenisa Bekele	Ethiopia	7:40.00	
8	Abera Kuma	Ethiopia	7:40.85	PB
9	Ayanleh Souleiman	Djibouti	7:42.22	NR
10	Polat Kemboi Arıkan	Turkey	7:42.31	NR
11	Lucas Rotich	Kenya	7:49.48	
12	James Kwalia	Qatar	7:51.36	
13	Antar Zerguelaïne	Algeria	8:21.95	
—	Kamal Boulahfane	Algeria	DNF	
—	Suleiman Simotwo	Kenya	DNF	PM
—	Remmy Limo Ndiwa	Kenya	DNF	PM

3000 Metres steeplechase
Rank	Athlete	Nation	Time	Points	Notes
1st place, gold medalist(s)	Paul Kipsiele Koech	Kenya	7:56.58	4	MR, WL
2nd place, silver medalist(s)	Richard Mateelong	Kenya	7:56.81	2	PB
3rd place, bronze medalist(s)	Roba Gari	Ethiopia	8:06.16	1	NR
4	Jairus Birech	Kenya	8:06.72		PB
5	Conseslus Kipruto	Kenya	8:08.92		
6	Bernard Nganga	Kenya	8:11.00		
7	Gilbert Kirui	Kenya	8:11.27		PB
8	Elijah Kipterege	Kenya	8:12.84		
9	Jonathan Ndiku	Kenya	8:20.96		SB
10	Benjamin Kiplagat	Uganda	8:22.94		
11	Ruben Ramolefi	South Africa	8:24.28		SB
12	Brimin Kipruto	Kenya	8:26.59		
13	Simon Ayeko	Uganda	8:27.13		
14	Nahom Mesfin Tariku	Ethiopia	8:32.97		
15	Tareq Mubarak Taher	Bahrain	8:41.42		
16	Tarık Langat Akdağ	Turkey	8:42.36		
—	Nelson Cherutich	Kenya	DNF		PM
—	Robert Kipkoech	Kenya	DNF		PM

High jump
Rank	Athlete	Nation	Height	Points	Notes
1st place, gold medalist(s)	Dimitrios Chondrokoukis	Greece	2.32 m	4	=WL
2nd place, silver medalist(s)	Jesse Williams	United States	2.30 m	2	
3rd place, bronze medalist(s)	Mickaël Hanany	France	2.30 m	1	
4	Samson Oni	Great Britain	2.27 m		
5	Donald Thomas	Bahamas	2.27 m		=SB
5	Trevor Barry	Bahamas	2.27 m		SB
7	Zhang Guowei	China	2.27 m		
8	Jaroslav Bába	Czech Republic	2.24 m		
9	Kabelo Kgosiemang	Botswana	2.24 m		SB
10	Aleksey Dmitrik	Russia	2.20 m		
11	Muamer Aissa Barsham	Qatar	2.20 m		SB
12	Rashid Al-Mannai	Qatar	2.20 m		

Long jump
Rank	Athlete	Nation	Distance	Points	Notes
1st place, gold medalist(s)	Aleksandr Menkov	Russia	8.22 m (+1.6 m/s)	4	
2nd place, silver medalist(s)	Godfrey Khotso Mokoena	South Africa	8.10 m (+0.9 m/s)	2	
3rd place, bronze medalist(s)	Ndiss Kaba Badji	Senegal	8.04 m (+0.9 m/s)	1	
4	Greg Rutherford	Great Britain	7.98 m (+1.0 m/s)		
5	Tommi Evilä	Finland	7.92 m (+0.9 m/s)		
6	Salim Sdiri	France	7.79 m (+0.6 m/s)		
7	Tyrone Smith	Bermuda	7.69 m (+1.5 m/s)		
8	Andrew Howe	Italy	7.16 m (+0.8 m/s)		
—	Chris Tomlinson	Great Britain	NM		

Discus throw
Rank	Athlete	Nation	Distance	Points	Notes
1st place, gold medalist(s)	Piotr Małachowski	Poland	67.53 m	4	SB
2nd place, silver medalist(s)	Ehsan Haddadi	Iran	66.32 m	2	
3rd place, bronze medalist(s)	~~Zoltán Kővágó~~	~~Hungary~~	~~65.77 m~~	~~1~~	DQ (Note: Due to doping violations Kővágó's results during this competition were disqualified.)
4	Gerd Kanter	Estonia	65.57 m		
5	Benn Harradine	Australia	64.29 m		SB
6	Vikas Gowda	India	64.10 m		
7	Virgilijus Alekna	Lithuania	63.99 m		
8	Märt Israel	Estonia	62.82 m		
9	Ercüment Olgundeniz	Turkey	61.84 m		
10	Frank Casañas	Spain	61.55 m		
11	Andrius Gudžius	Lithuania	60.27 m		

=== Women's ===
100 Metres
Rank	Athlete	Nation	Time	Points	Notes
1st place, gold medalist(s)	Allyson Felix	United States	10.92	4	MR
2nd place, silver medalist(s)	Veronica Campbell Brown	Jamaica	10.94	2	
3rd place, bronze medalist(s)	Shelly-Ann Fraser-Pryce	Jamaica	11.00	1	
4	Blessing Okagbare	Nigeria	11.01		
5	LaShauntea Moore	United States	11.13		
6	Mikele Barber	United States	11.13		
7	Kerron Stewart	Jamaica	11.16		
8	Sherone Simpson	Jamaica	11.22		SB
			Wind: (+0.7 m/s)		

800 Metres
Rank	Athlete	Nation	Time	Points	Notes
1st place, gold medalist(s)	Pamela Jelimo	Kenya	1:56.94	4	MR, WL
2nd place, silver medalist(s)	Fantu Magiso	Ethiopia	1:57.90	2	NR
3rd place, bronze medalist(s)	Janeth Jepkosgei	Kenya	1:58.50	1	
4	Yusneysi Santiusti	Cuba	1:59.26		
5	Emma Jackson	Great Britain	1:59.37		
6	Molly Ludlow	United States	1:59.51		SB
7	Eunice Sum	Kenya	1:59.94		
8	Tintu Luka	India	2:01.09		
9	Cherono Koech	Kenya	2:01.20		
10	Tamsyn Manou	Australia	2:02.75		
—	Yekaterina Kupina	Russia	DNF		

3000 Metres
Rank	Athlete	Nation	Time	Points	Notes
1st place, gold medalist(s)	Vivian Cheruiyot	Kenya	8:46.44	4	WL
2nd place, silver medalist(s)	Meseret Defar	Ethiopia	8:46.49	2	
3rd place, bronze medalist(s)	Sylvia Jebiwot Kibet	Kenya	8:47.49	1	
4	Gelete Burka	Ethiopia	8:48.92		
5	Priscah Jepleting Cherono	Kenya	8:50.04		
6	Viola Kibiwot	Kenya	8:50.63		
7	Janet Kisa	Kenya	8:51.63		
8	Pauline Korikwiang	Kenya	8:52.04		
9	Maryam Yusuf Jamal	Bahrain	8:54.51		
10	Nancy Chepkwemoi	Kenya	8:56.52		
11	Margaret Muriuki	Kenya	8:57.43		
12	Gotytom Gebreslase	Ethiopia	9:00.97		
13	Stephanie Twell	Great Britain	9:01.64		
14	Ingvill Måkestad Bovim	Norway	9:10.45		
15	Nazret Weldu	Eritrea	9:11.32		NR
—	Anna Luchkina	Russia	DNF		

100 Metres hurdles
Rank	Athlete	Nation	Time	Points	Notes
1st place, gold medalist(s)	Brigitte Foster-Hylton	Jamaica	12.60	4	
2nd place, silver medalist(s)	Kellie Wells	United States	12.72	2	
3rd place, bronze medalist(s)	Phylicia George	Canada	12.79	1	SB
4	Nia Ali	United States	12.93		
5	Perdita Felicien	Canada	12.95		SB
6	Priscilla Lopes-Schliep	Canada	12.95		
7	Yvette Lewis	United States	13.08		
8	Nikkita Holder	Canada	20.81		
			Wind: (+0.1 m/s)		

400 Metres hurdles
Rank	Athlete	Nation	Time	Points	Notes
1st place, gold medalist(s)	Melaine Walker	Jamaica	54.62	4	WL
2nd place, silver medalist(s)	Kaliese Spencer	Jamaica	54.99	2	
3rd place, bronze medalist(s)	Perri Shakes-Drayton	Great Britain	55.25	1	
4	Lauren Wells	Australia	55.75		
5	Hayat Lambarki	Morocco	56.29		
6	Jasmine Chaney	United States	56.55		
7	Anna Jesień	Poland	56.89		
8	Stephenie Ann McPherson	Jamaica	58.61		

Pole vault
Rank	Athlete	Nation	Height	Points	Notes
1st place, gold medalist(s)	Anastasia Savchenko	Russia	4.57 m	4	PB
2nd place, silver medalist(s)	Silke Spiegelburg	Germany	4.57 m	2	
3rd place, bronze medalist(s)	Nikoleta Kyriakopoulou	Greece	4.50 m	1	
4	Vanessa Boslak	France	4.50 m		SB
4	Kate Rooney	Great Britain	4.50 m		SB
6	Lacy Janson	United States	4.40 m		
7	Yuliya Golubchikova	Russia	4.30 m		
8	Mary Saxer	United States	4.30 m		=SB
9	Aleksandra Kiryashova	Russia	4.20 m		
9	Sally Peake	Great Britain	4.20 m		SB
11	Vicky Parnov	Australia	4.00 m		
11	Cathrine Larsåsen	Norway	4.00 m		
—	Monika Pyrek	Poland	NM		

Triple jump
Rank	Athlete	Nation	Distance	Points	Notes
1st place, gold medalist(s)	Olga Rypakova	Kazakhstan	14.33 m (+0.5 m/s)	4	
2nd place, silver medalist(s)	Keila Costa	Brazil	14.31 m (+0.5 m/s)	2	SB
3rd place, bronze medalist(s)	Françoise Mbango Etone	France	14.09 m (+0.3 m/s)	1	SB
4	Dana Velďáková	Slovakia	14.00 m (±0.0 m/s)		
5	Tatyana Lebedeva	Russia	13.84 m (+0.3 m/s)		
6	Aleksandra Kotlyarova	Uzbekistan	13.78 m (+0.5 m/s)		
7	Marija Šestak	Slovenia	13.56 m (+0.6 m/s)		
8	Małgorzata Trybańska-Strońska	Poland	13.55 m (+0.9 m/s)		
9	Nathalie Marie-Nely	France	13.51 m (+0.4 m/s)		SB

Shot put
Rank	Athlete	Nation	Distance	Points	Notes
1st place, gold medalist(s)	~~Nadzeya Astapchuk~~	~~Belarus~~	~~20.53 m~~	~~4~~	DQ (Note: Due to doping violations Astapchuk's results during this competition were disqualified.)
2nd place, silver medalist(s)	Jillian Camarena-Williams	United States	19.81 m	2	
3rd place, bronze medalist(s)	Nadine Kleinert	Germany	19.67 m	1	
4	Anita Márton	Hungary	18.33 m		
5	Cleopatra Borel	Trinidad and Tobago	18.30 m		
6	Josephine Terlecki	Germany	17.71 m		
7	Jessica Cérival	France	16.49 m		

Javelin throw
Rank	Athlete	Nation	Distance	Points	Notes
1st place, gold medalist(s)	~~Mariya Abakumova~~	~~Russia~~	~~66.86 m~~	~~4~~	DQ (Note: Due to doping violations Abakumova's results during this competition were disqualified.)
2nd place, silver medalist(s)	Barbora Špotáková	Czech Republic	66.17 m	2	
3rd place, bronze medalist(s)	Christina Obergföll	Germany	64.59 m	1	
4	Xiaowei du	China	61.43 m		
5	Goldie Sayers	Great Britain	61.03 m		
6	Kim Mickle	Australia	60.87 m		
7	Martina Ratej	Slovenia	60.80 m		
8	Linda Stahl	Germany	59.22 m		
9	Madara Sady Ndure	Latvia	58.01 m		
10	Sanni Utriainen	Finland	57.80 m		SB
11	Anastasiya Svechnikova	Uzbekistan	54.47 m		
12	Elisabeth Eberl	Austria	51.89 m		
—	Jarmila Jurkovičová	Czech Republic	NM		

== Promotional events results ==
=== Men's ===
100 Metres
Rank	Athlete	Nation	Time	Notes
1st place, gold medalist(s)	Justin Gatlin	United States	9.87	
2nd place, silver medalist(s)	Asafa Powell	Jamaica	9.88	
3rd place, bronze medalist(s)	Lerone Clarke	Jamaica	9.99	=PB
4	Mike Rodgers	United States	10.00	
5	Nesta Carter	Jamaica	10.05	
6	Darvis Patton	United States	10.11	
7	Jak Ali Harvey	Jamaica	10.14	
8	Jimmy Vicaut	France	10.28	
			Wind: (+0.4 m/s)	

800 metres
Rank	Heat	Athlete	Nation	Time	Notes
1st place, gold medalist(s)	1	David Rudisha	Kenya	1:43.10	WL
2nd place, silver medalist(s)	1	Job Koech Kinyor	Kenya	1:43.76	PB
3rd place, bronze medalist(s)	1	Andrew Osagie	Great Britain	1:44.64	PB
4	1	Antonio Reina	Spain	1:44.65	
5	1	David Mutinda Mutua	Kenya	1:44.66	SB
6	1	Michael Rimmer	Great Britain	1:44.86	
7	1	Andreas Bube	Denmark	1:44.99	PB
8	1	Jakub Holuša	Czech Republic	1:45.12	PB
9	1	Musaeb Abdulrahman Balla	Qatar	1:45.19	PB
10	2	Pierre-Ambroise Bosse	France	1:45.69	PB
11	2	Amine El Manaoui	Morocco	1:45.70	SB
12	2	Sajjad Moradi	Iran	1:45.98	
13	2	Mukhtar Mohammed	Great Britain	1:46.41	
14	2	Alfred Kirwa Yego	Kenya	1:46.46	
15	2	Nadjim Manseur	Algeria	1:47.98	
16	2	Jeff Lastennet	France	1:48.60	SB
17	1	Nabil Madi	Algeria	1:50.46	
18	2	Mohamed Amine Layachi	Algeria	1:51.19	PB
—	1	Silas Kosgei	Kenya	DNF	PM
—	2	Obaid al-Quraini	Oman	DNF	PM

== See also ==
- 2012 Diamond League
