= 1999 African Junior Athletics Championships =

4th African Junior Championships
- Dates: 22 – 25 July
- Host city: Tunis, Tunisia
- Level: Under-20
- Events: 43

The 1999 African Junior Athletics Championships was the fourth edition of the biennial, continental athletics tournament for African athletes aged 19 years or younger. It was held in Tunis, Tunisia, from 22–25 July. A total of 43 events were contested, 22 by men and 21 by women.

== Medal table ==
* Host nation (Tunisia)

Rank	NOC	Gold	Silver	Bronze	Total
1	Tunisia (TUN)	10	11	10	31
2	South Africa (RSA)	10	2	1	13
3	Kenya (KEN)	6	6	0	12
4	Egypt (EGY)	3	3	4	10
5	Mauritius (MRI)	2	5	0	7
6	Morocco (MAR)	2	4	6	12
7	Ivory Coast (CIV)	2	1	1	4
8	Ghana (GHA)	1	2	6	9
9	Zimbabwe (ZIM)	1	1	0	2
10	Botswana (BOT)	1	0	3	4
11	Madagascar (MAD)	1	0	0	1
11	Mali (MLI)	1	0	0	1
11	Namibia (NAM)	1	0	0	1
11	Senegal (SEN)	1	0	0	1
15	Algeria (ALG)	0	5	9	14
16	Burkina Faso (BUR)	0	1	1	2
17	Gabon (GAB)	0	1	0	1
18	Eritrea (ERI)	0	0	1	1
Totals (18 entries)		42	42	42	126

== Medal summary ==
=== Men ===
Event	Gold		Silver		Bronze	
100 metres	Tefera Chirenda (ZIM)	10.52	Souleymane Meité (CIV)	10.70	Eric Appiah (GHA)	10.74
200 metres	Paul Gorries (RSA)	21.19	Fernando Augustin (MRI)	21.42	Harry Adu-Mfum (GHA)	21.73
400 metres	Ousmane Niang (SEN)	47.41	Fernando Augustin (MRI)	47.70	California Molefe (BOT)	48.03
800 metres	Mbulaeni Mulaudzi (RSA)	1:49.13	Vincent Kemboi (KEN)	1:49.66	Abdelkabir Louraïbi (MAR)	1:50.47
1500 metres	Peter Kipkoech (KEN)	3:45.81	Rashid Ramzi (MAR)	3:47.13	Reda Khaldi (ALG)	3:50.10
5000 metres	Reuben Kamzee (KEN)	13:43.30	Duncan Lebo (KEN)	13:46.48	Driss Benismail (MAR)	14:11.11
10,000 metres	Duncan Lebo (KEN)	29:59.27	Reuben Kamzee (KEN)	29:59.34	Jeffrey Gwebu (RSA)	30:21.93
110 metres hurdles (Wind: +2.3 m/s)	Ryan Jackson (RSA)	14.60 w	Selwyn Lieutier (MRI)	14.79 w	Hamdi Mhirsi (TUN)	15.00 w
400 metres hurdles	Alwyn Myburgh (RSA)	51.03	Mohamed Mouhlal (MAR)	52.13	Héni Kéchi (TUN)	52.51
3000 metres steeplechase	Raymond Yator (KEN)	8:19.84	Christopher Soget (KEN)	8:20.07	Abdelatif Chemlal (MAR)	8:45.78
4×100 m relay	South Africa (RSA); Daniel Mahlangu; Ryan Jackson; Tshepo Thobelangope; Paul Gorries	41.42	Ghana (GHA); Eric Appiah; Seidu Duah; Anthony Essumang; Harry Adu-Mfum	41.74	Botswana (BOT); Tshepho Kelaotswe; Albert Kelebele; California Molefe; Otawsitse Kamopede	42.02
4×400 m relay	South Africa (RSA); Tshepo Thobelangope; Molensi Mpholaleng; Alwyn Myburgh; Paul Gorries	3:13.01	Tunisia (TUN); Khabab Bousnina; Héni Kéchi; Selim Medersi; Laroussi Titi	3:15.75	Botswana (BOT); Othusistse Ramophedi; Tshepho Kelaotswe; Albert Kelebele; California Molefe	3:20.00
10,000 metres walk	Sofiene Azouzi (TUN)	49:10.64	Ismail Bendoumia (ALG)	49:36.29	Ahmed Amira (ALG)	51:49.03
High jump	Kabelo Mmono (BOT)	2.05 m	Mohamed Ouaziz (ALG)	1.95 m	Fernando Nana (BUR)	1.85 m
Pole vault	Béchir Zaghouani (TUN)	4.80 m	Karim Berhaiem (TUN)	4.60 m	Mouloud Ziani (ALG)	4.00 m
Long jump	Daniel Mahlangu (RSA)	7.45 m	Jonathan Chimier (MRI)	7.44 m (w)	Anthony Essumang (GHA)	7.42 m
Triple jump	Abdallah Machraoui (TUN)	15.57 m	Mourad Tabbache (ALG)	14.75 m	Yahya Berrabah (MAR)	14.71 m
Shot put	Hicham Aït Aha (MAR)	16.56 m	Mohamed Meddeb (TUN)	15.36 m	Mohsen Bousnina (TUN)	15.19 m
Discus throw	Hannes Hopley (RSA)	54.97 m	Hatem El-Kébir (TUN)	49.60 m	Mohsen Bousnina (TUN)	47.53 m
Hammer throw	Ahmed Abdelraouf (EGY)	59.02 m	Saber Souid (TUN)	58.07 m	Wael Abou Dhab (EGY)	54.78 m
Javelin throw	Gerhardus Pienaar (RSA)	70.03 m	Sadek Al-Mohsen (EGY)	63.29 m	Sofiène El-Ajra (TUN)	56.08 m
Decathlon	Mustapha Kheirallah (EGY)	6763 pts	Abdel Hamid Médjamia (ALG)	6202 pts	Mohamed Khal Letaief (TUN)	5625 pts

=== Women ===
Event	Gold		Silver		Bronze	
100 metres	Makaridja Sanganoko (CIV)	11.74	Anais Oyembo (GAB)	11.94	Awatef Hamrouni (TUN)	11.98
200 metres (Wind: +2.6 m/s)	Makaridja Sanganoko (CIV)	24.23 w	Awatef Ben Hassine (TUN)	24.59 w	Aisha Pinamang (GHA)	24.69 w
400 metres	Awatef Ben Hassine (TUN)	54.54	Akosua Serwaa (GHA)	55.16	Ethel Lokko (GHA)	55.86
800 metres	Abir Nakhli (TUN)	2:06.89	Nancy Langat (KEN)	2:07.01	Akosua Serwaa (GHA)	2:07.80
1500 metres	Jeruto Kiptum (KEN)	4:19.61	Seltana Aït Hammou (MAR)	4:19.94	Meryem Karouani (MAR)	4:20.05
3000 metres	Malika Asahssah (MAR)	9:15.11	Pamela Kiyara (KEN)	9:23.50	Fouzia Zoutat (ALG)	9:23.56
10,000 metres	Beatrice Toroitich (KEN)	36:08.03	Siphuluwazi Sibindi (ZIM)	36:37.37	Simret Sultan (ERI)	36:53.30
100 metres hurdles (Wind: +2.6 m/s)	Stéphanie Domaingue (MRI)	14.36 w	Hamida Benhocine (ALG)	14.71 w	Hajer Jelel (EGY)	14.85 w
400 metres hurdles	Lantosoa Razafinjanahary (MAD)	60.15	Houria El-Mohandis (MAR)	61.66	Najia Bouaati (MAR)	61.83
4×100 m relay	Tunisia (TUN); Awatef Hamrouni; Awatef Ben Hassine; Saloua Dellagi; Nadia Abid	46.98	Ghana (GHA); Aisha Pinamang; Ethel Lokko; Margaret Simpson; Esther Dankwa	47.13	Algeria (ALG); Sarah Bouaoudia; Sara Arrous; Houria Moussa; Hamida Benhocine	47.89
4×400 m relay	Ghana (GHA); Grace Nartey; Esther Dankwa; Akosua Serwaa; Ethel Lokko	3:41.83	Tunisia (TUN); Awatef Ben Mansour; Abir Nakhli; Maha Chaouachi; Awatef Ben Hassine	3:42.66	Algeria (ALG); Houria Moussa; Hamida Benhocine; Sarah Bouaoudia; Sara Arrous	3:58.32
5000 metres walk	Chaima Trabelsi (TUN)	26:04.45	Rania Hammani (TUN)	26:06.35	Hakima Embarek (ALG)	26:46.16
High jump	Nicolize Steyn (RSA)	1.82 m	Marizca Gertenbach (RSA)	1.76 m	Sameh Drid (TUN)	1.65 m
Pole vault	Sirine Balti (TUN)	3.65 m	Sylma Jordaan (RSA)	3.40 m	Aida Mohsni (TUN)	3.15 m
Long jump	Koïta Yah Soucko (MLI)	5.77 m	Zine-Bahi Othmani (TUN)	5.70 m	Linda Félix (SEY)	5.55 m
Triple jump	Ilhem Ben Salah (TUN)	12.86 m (w)	Mariette Mien (BUR)	12.23 m	Ghada Ismail (EGY)	12.07 m
Shot put	Amira Naji (EGY)	14.15 m	Afef Ben Khaled (TUN)	12.30 m	Ines Boujenfa (TUN)	12.17 m
Discus throw	Darine Hajabi (TUN)	43.44 m	Ines Boujenfa (TUN)	41.12 m	Kazai Suzanne Kragbé (CIV)	39.32 m
Hammer throw	Melissa Sooprayen (MRI)	43.85 m	Racha Kerim (EGY)	43.42 m	Nabila Kérouche (ALG)	40.42 m
Javelin throw	Daria Smith (NAM)	46.91 m	Ola Ali (EGY)	40.79 m	Nesrine Mohamed (EGY)	40.29 m
Heptathlon	Margaret Simpson (GHA)	5366 pts	Stéphanie Domaingue (MRI)	4673 pts	Soraya Mehdioui (ALG)	4652 pts
