= Yator =

Yator is a surname. Notable people with this surname include:

- Albert Yator (1993–2011), Kenyan long-distance runner
- Raymond Yator (born 1981), Kenyan steeplechase athlete
- Jacob Yator (born 1982), Kenyan athletics competitor
- Vincent Yator (born 1989), Kenyan runner also known as Vincent Kipsegechi Yator
