= 2007 World Championships in Athletics – Men's 3000 metres steeplechase =

The Men's 3.000 metres Steeplechase event at the 2007 World Championships in Athletics took place on August 26, 2007 (heats) and August 28, 2007 (final) at the Nagai Stadium in Osaka, Japan.

== Medalists ==
Gold	Silver	Bronze
Brimin Kipruto; Kenya	Ezekiel Kemboi; Kenya	Richard Mateelong; Kenya

== Records ==
Prior to the competition, the following records were as follows.

World record	Saif Saaeed Shaheen (QAT)	7:53.63	Brussels, Belgium	3 September 2004
Championship record	Moses Kiptanui (KEN)	8:04.16	Gothenburg, Sweden	11 August 1995
World leading	Paul Kipsiele Koech (KEN)	7:59.42	Stockholm, Sweden	7 August 2007

== Schedule ==
Date	Time	Round
August 26, 2007	10:00	Heats
August 28, 2007	20:55	Final

== Results ==
KEY:	q	Fastest non-qualifiers	Q	Qualified	WR	World record	AR	Area record	NR	National record	PB	Personal best	SB	Seasonal best

=== Heats ===
Qualification: First 3 in each heat(Q) and the next 6 fastest(q) advance to the semifinals.

Rank	Heat	Name	Nationality	Time	Notes
1	1	Tareq Mubarak Taher	Bahrain	8:19.99	Q
2	1	Abdelkader Hachlaf	Morocco	8:20.03	Q
3	1	Ezekiel Kemboi	Kenya	8:20.08	Q
4	1	Bouabdellah Tahri	France	8:20.09	q
5	1	Abubaker Ali Kamal	Qatar	8:21.20	q, SB
6	3	Brimin Kipruto	Kenya	8:21.93	Q
7	3	Halil Akkaş	Turkey	8:22.37	Q
8	3	Mustafa Mohamed	Sweden	8:22.80	Q
9	3	Ali Ahmed Al-Amri	Saudi Arabia	8:23.61	q, SB
10	3	Gary Roba	Ethiopia	8:23.98	q
11	1	Eliseo Martín	Spain	8:24.49	q
12	3	José Luis Blanco	Spain	8:25.00	q
13	3	Filmon Ghirmai	Germany	8:25.17	
14	3	Boštjan Buč	Slovenia	8:26.42	SB
15	3	Krijn van Koolwijk	Belgium	8:29.18	
16	2	Richard Mateelong	Kenya	8:29.49	Q
17	2	Nahom Mesfin Tariku	Ethiopia	8:29.57	Q
18	2	Brahim Taleb	Morocco	8:29.64	Q
19	2	Mircea Bogdan	Romania	8:30.07	
20	3	Aaron Aguayo	United States	8:30.86	
21	2	Joshua McAdams	United States	8:32.46	
22	2	Mahiedine Mekhissi-Benabbad	France	8:33.11	
23	1	Rabia Makhloufi	Algeria	8:33.88	
24	1	Bjørnar Ustad Kristensen	Norway	8:34.84	
25	3	Vincent Zouaoui Dandrieaux	France	8:36.05	
26	2	Yoshitaka Iwamizu	Japan	8:36.73	
27	1	Ruben Ramolefi	South Africa	8:39.50	
28	1	Benjamin Kiplagat	Uganda	8:40.65	
29	2	Zakrya Ali Kamil	Qatar	8:41.81	
30	2	Itai Maggidi	Israel	8:43.00	
31	2	Antonio David Jiménez	Spain	8:50.41	
32	1	Henrik Skoog	Sweden	8:51.61	
33	2	Pieter Desmet	Belgium	8:55.99	
34	1	Tom Brooks	United States	8:56.20	
35	3	Andrew Lemoncello	United Kingdom	8:58.93	
36	2	Youcef Abdi	Australia	9:51.33	
	1	Günther Weidlinger	Austria		DNF
	3	Hamid Ezzine	Morocco		DNF

=== Final ===
Rank	Name	Nationality	Time	Notes
1st place, gold medalist(s)	Brimin Kipruto	Kenya	8:13.82	
2nd place, silver medalist(s)	Ezekiel Kemboi	Kenya	8:16.94	
3rd place, bronze medalist(s)	Richard Mateelong	Kenya	8:17.59	
4	Mustafa Mohamed	Sweden	8:19.82	
5	Bouabdellah Tahri	France	8:20.27	
6	Halil Akkaş	Turkey	8:22.51	
7	Eliseo Martín	Spain	8:22.91	SB
8	Tareq Mubarak Taher	Bahrain	8:22.95	
9	Abdelkader Hachlaf	Morocco	8:24.18	
10	Gary Roba	Ethiopia	8:25.93	
11	Abubaker Ali Kamal	Qatar	8:26.90	
12	Nahom Mesfin Tariku	Ethiopia	8:28.86	
	Brahim Taleb	Morocco		DSQ
	José Luis Blanco	Spain		DSQ
	Ali Ahmed Al-Amri	Saudi Arabia		DNF
