= 2012 African Championships in Athletics – Men's 3000 metres steeplechase =

The men's 3000 metres steeplechase at the 2012 African Championships in Athletics was held at the Stade Charles de Gaulle on 29 June.

== Medalists ==
Gold	Abel Mutai; Kenya
Silver	Wilson Kipkemboi Maraba; Kenya
Bronze	Benjamin Kiplagat; Uganda

== Records ==
Standing records prior to the 2012 African Championships in Athletics
World record	Saif Saaeed Shaheen (QAT)	7:53.63	Brussels, Belgium	3 September 2004
African record	Brimin Kipruto (KEN)	7:53.64	Fontvieille, Monaco	22 July 2011
Championship record	Paul Kipsiele Koech (KEN)	8:11.03	Bambous, Mauritius	11 August 2006

== Schedule ==
Date	Time	Round
29 June 2012	16:50	Final

== Results ==
=== Final ===
Rank	Name	Nationality	Time	Note
1st place, gold medalist(s)	Abel Mutai	Kenya	8:16.05	
2nd place, silver medalist(s)	Wilson Kipkemboi Maraba	Kenya	8:16.96	
3rd place, bronze medalist(s)	Benjamin Kiplagat	Uganda	8:18.73	
4	Nahom Mesfin	Ethiopia	8:20.23	
5	Tafese Soboka	Ethiopia	8:26.33	
6	Habtamu Jaleta	Ethiopia	8:29.03	
7	Ruben Ramolefi	South Africa	8:29.53	
8	Jacob Araptany	Uganda	8:48.12	
9	Tumelo Motlagale	South Africa	9:06.11	
10	Malaba Tchendo	Togo	9:13.35	
11	Mahomet Adam	Benin	9:21.21	NR
12	Harouna Garba	Niger	9:46.28	
