= 2006 World Junior Championships in Athletics – Men's 3000 metres steeplechase =

The men's 3000 metres steeplechase event at the 2006 World Junior Championships in Athletics was held in Beijing, China, at Chaoyang Sports Centre on 16 and 19 August.

== Medalists ==
Gold	Willy Komen; Kenya
Silver	Bisluke Kipkorir Kiplagat; Kenya
Bronze	Abdel Ghani Aït Bahmad; Morocco

== Results ==
=== Final ===
19 August

Rank	Name	Nationality	Time	Notes
1st place, gold medalist(s)	Willy Komen	Kenya	8:14.00	
2nd place, silver medalist(s)	Bisluke Kipkorir Kiplagat	Kenya	8:18.11	
3rd place, bronze medalist(s)	Abdel Ghani Aït Bahmad	Morocco	8:20.05	
4	Nahom Mesfin	Ethiopia	8:28.29	
5	Lin Xiangqian	China	8:30.55	
6	Benjamin Kiplagat	Uganda	8:34.14	
7	László Tóth	Hungary	8:40.93	
8	Saad Salem Malek	Qatar	8:43.60	
9	Thamer Kamal Ali	Qatar	8:48.73	
10	Ali Al-Amri	Saudi Arabia	8:49.88	
11	Vincent Chapuis	France	8:55.10	
	Tareq Mubarak Taher	Bahrain	DQ	IAAF rule 141

=== Heats ===
16 August

==== Heat 1 ====
Rank	Name	Nationality	Time	Notes
1	Willy Komen	Kenya	8:33.36	Q
2	Thamer Kamal Ali	Qatar	8:33.66	Q
3	Abdel Ghani Aït Bahmad	Morocco	8:34.64	Q
4	Nahom Mesfin	Ethiopia	8:35.05	Q
5	Benjamin Kiplagat	Uganda	8:35.77	q
6	László Tóth	Hungary	8:49.15	q
7	Tsuyoshi Takeda	Japan	8:51.75	
8	José Peña	Venezuela	8:52.36	
9	Yoann Kowal	France	8:58.74	
10	Igor Chernobay	Russia	8:58.81	
11	Yang Le	China	9:05.38	
12	Shafat Salad	New Zealand	9:11.16	
13	Adem Belir	Turkey	9:12.28	
14	Aaron Arias	Mexico	9:13.84	
15	Jesús Manuel Cardó	Spain	9:42.32	
16	Edwin Molepo	South Africa	9:46.06	
17	Alexander Mason	United States	9:51.61	

==== Heat 2 ====
Rank	Name	Nationality	Time	Notes
1	Bisluke Kipkorir Kiplagat	Kenya	8:36.34	Q
2	Lin Xiangqian	China	8:41.10	Q
3	Vincent Chapuis	France	8:45.80	Q
4	Saad Salem Malek	Qatar	8:47.59	q
5	Ali Al-Amri	Saudi Arabia	8:49.53	q
6	Osman Omer	Sudan	8:59.92	
7	Mario Bazán	Peru	9:02.33	
8	Marvin Blanco	Venezuela	9:02.56	
9	Marcus Dillon	Canada	9:10.12	
10	Atsuro Kikuchi	Japan	9:12.11	
11	Osman Bas	Turkey	9:14.52	
12	Alessandro Salsi	Italy	9:23.10	
13	Cory Thorne	United States	9:24.10	
14	José Luis Galván	Spain	9:24.19	
15	Messaoud Hamed	Tunisia	9:31.69	
16	Ben Ashkettle	Australia	9:33.86	
	Tareq Mubarak Taher	Bahrain	DQ	IAAF rule 141 Q

== Participation ==
According to an unofficial count, 34 athletes from 25 countries participated in the event.

- Australia (1)
- Bahrain (1)
- Canada (1)
- China (2)
- Ethiopia (1)
- France (2)
- Hungary (1)
- Italy (1)
- Japan (2)
- Kenya (2)
- Mexico (1)
- Morocco (1)
- New Zealand (1)
- Peru (1)
- Qatar (2)
- Russia (1)
- Saudi Arabia (1)
- South Africa (1)
- Spain (2)
- Sudan (1)
- Tunisia (1)
- Turkey (2)
- Uganda (1)
- United States (2)
- Venezuela (2)
