= 2006 African Championships in Athletics – Men's 3000 metres steeplechase =

The men's 3000 metres steeplechase event at the 2006 African Championships in Athletics was held at the Stade Germain Comarmond on August 11.

== Results ==
| Rank | Name | Nationality | Time | Notes |
|---|---|---|---|---|
| 1st place, gold medalist(s) | Paul Kipsiele Koech | Kenya | 8:11.03 | |
| 2nd place, silver medalist(s) | Abdelkader Hachlaf | Morocco | 8:33.52 | |
| 3rd place, bronze medalist(s) | Ruben Ramolefi | South Africa | 8:39.67 | |
| 4 | Brahim Taleb | Morocco | 8:40.90 | |
| 5 | Hamid Ezzine | Morocco | 8:46.45 | |
| 6 | Abrham Kebeto | Ethiopia | 8:47.54 | |
| 7 | Abraham Cherono | Kenya | 8:51.38 | |
| 8 | Emmanuel Mkhabela | South Africa | 9:24.07 | |
| | Ezekiel Kemboi | Kenya | DQ | |

Note: Ezekiel Kemboi originally finished second but was disqualified for improper hurdling.
