= Abdelatif Chemlal =

Moroccan long-distance runner

Medal record

Men's athletics

Representing Morocco

African Championships
Bronze medal – third place	2004 Brazzaville	3000 m st.

Abdelatif Chemlal (Arabic: عبداللطيف شملال) (born 11 January 1982 in Khouribga) is a Moroccan long-distance runner who specializes in the 3000 metre steeplechase. His personal best time is 8:21.00 minutes, achieved in June 2002 in Seville. He represented his country in the steeplechase at the 2004 Summer Olympics, running in the heats.

He was the bronze medallist in the steeplechase at the 2000 World Junior Championships in Athletics. He followed this up with another bronze at the African Junior Championships in Athletics the next year. In 2004 he won a continental medal on the senior stage, finishing behind David Chemweno and Richard Mateelong to take the bronze.

Chemlal was suspended by the IAAF from December 2004 to December 2006. He returned to international competition at the 2008 IAAF World Cross Country Championships and ran in the heats of the steeplechase at the 2009 World Championships in Athletics.

== Achievements ==
Year	Competition	Venue	Position	Event	Notes
Representing Morocco
2000	World Junior Championships	Santiago, Chile	3rd	3000 m st.	8:43.57
2001	African Junior Championships	Réduit, Mauritius	3rd	3000 m st.	8:55.76
2004	African Championships	Brazzaville, Congo	3rd	3000 m st.	8:31.01
2004	Olympic Games	Athens, Greece	25th (h)	3000 m st.	8:29.36
2009	World Championships	Berlin, Germany	17th (h)	3000 m st.	8:25.68
2009	Jeux de la Francophonie	Beirut, Lebanon	1st	3000 m st.	8:40.18

== See also ==
- List of sportspeople sanctioned for doping offences
