= Athletics at the 2010 Asian Games – Men's 3000 metres steeplechase =

Men's 3000 metres steeplechase at the 2010 Asian Games
- Venue: Aoti Main Stadium
- Date: 23 November 2010
- Competitors: 11 from 9 nations

Medalists
gold medal	Tareq Mubarak Taher	Bahrain
silver medal	Thamer Kamal Ali	Qatar
bronze medal	Ali Al-Amri	Saudi Arabia

The men's 3000 metres steeplechase event at the 2010 Asian Games was held at the Aoti Main Stadium, Guangzhou, China on 23 November 2010.

== Schedule ==
All times are China Standard Time (UTC+08:00)

Date	Time	Event
Tuesday, 23 November 2010	17:00	Final

== Records ==
Prior to this competition, the existing world, Asian and Games records were as follows.

World Record	Saif Saaeed Shaheen (QAT)	7:53.63	Brussels, Belgium	3 September 2004
Asian Record	Saif Saaeed Shaheen (QAT)	7:53.63	Brussels, Belgium	3 September 2004
Games Record	Tareq Mubarak Taher (BRN)	8:26.85	Doha, Qatar	8 December 2006

== Results ==
Rank	Athlete	Time	Notes
1st place, gold medalist(s)	Tareq Mubarak Taher (BRN)	8:25.89	GR
2nd place, silver medalist(s)	Thamer Kamal Ali (QAT)	8:26.27	
3rd place, bronze medalist(s)	Ali Al-Amri (KSA)	8:30.96	
4	Zakrya Ali Kamil (QAT)	8:38.71	
5	Tsuyoshi Takeda (JPN)	8:41.26	
6	Elam Singh (IND)	8:47.34	
7	Wu Wen-chien (TPE)	9:00.80	
8	Rene Herrera (PHI)	9:02.93	
9	Ho Chin-ping (TPE)	9:07.03	
10	Yang Tao (CHN)	9:09.50	
11	Nabil Al-Garbi (YEM)	9:16.80	
