= Athletics at the 2011 All-Africa Games – Men's 3000 metres steeplechase =

The Men's 3000 metres steeplechase at the 2011 All-Africa Games took place on 11 September at the Estádio Nacional do Zimpeto.

The final held at 8:09 p.m. local time.

== Medalists ==
Gold	Birhan Getahun (ETH)
Silver	Roba Gari (ETH)
Bronze	Sisay Koreme (ETH)

== Records ==
Prior to this competition, the existing World, African record and World leading were as follows:

World record	Saif Saaeed Shaheen (QAT)	7:53.63	Brussels, Belgium	3 September 2004
World leading	Brimin Kiprop Kipruto (KEN)	7:53.64	Monaco	22 July 2011
African record	Brimin Kiprop Kipruto (KEN)	7:53.64	Monaco	22 July 2011

== Results ==
Rank	Athlete	Nationality	Time	Note
1st place, gold medalist(s)	Birhan Getahun	Ethiopia	8:17.36	
2nd place, silver medalist(s)	Roba Gari	Ethiopia	8:18.42	
3rd place, bronze medalist(s)	Sisay Koreme	Ethiopia	8:20.72	
4	Jairus Kipchoge Birech	Kenya	8:21.30	
5	Jacob Araptany	Uganda	8:24.08	
6	Myiramsabimama Angelime	Rwanda	8:24.57	NR
7	Weynay Ghebreselasse	Eritrea	8:33.59	NR
8	Abel Kiprop Mutai	Kenya	8:36.75	
9	Roberto Mandje	Equatorial Guinea	9:43.23	
	Idriss Yousif	Sudan	DNS	
