= Chemweno =

Chemweno is a surname of Kenyan origin, mainly Keiyo and Marakwet males. The name is rarely used among the Tugen subtribe of the Kalenjin community. According to Kalenjin culture naming traditions, prefix kip/ki/kib is for males and prefix jep/je/jeb or chep/che/cheb is for females. Keiyo, Marakwet and Tugen subtribes used female prefixes on boys to conceal their identity during pre colonial era mainly attributed to tribal wars of cattle raiding and revenge. The larger Kalenjin use the names Kimweno and Kipngeno. Chemweno may refer to:

- David Chemweno (born 1981), Kenyan steeplechase runner
- Elizabeth Chemweno (born 1978), Kenyan marathon runner and twice winner at the Alexander the Great Marathon
- Mary Chemweno, Kenyan middle-distance runner and winner at the 1985 African Championships in Athletics
