= 2000 World Junior Championships in Athletics – Men's 3000 metres steeplechase =

The men's 3000 metres steeplechase event at the 2000 World Junior Championships in Athletics was held in Santiago, Chile, at Estadio Nacional Julio Martínez Prádanos on 18 and 21 October.

== Medalists ==
Gold	Raymond Yator; Kenya
Silver	David Chemweno; Kenya
Bronze	Abdelatif Chemlal; Morocco

== Results ==
=== Final ===
21 October

Rank	Name	Nationality	Time	Notes
1st place, gold medalist(s)	Raymond Yator	Kenya	8:16.34	
2nd place, silver medalist(s)	David Chemweno	Kenya	8:31.95	
3rd place, bronze medalist(s)	Abdelatif Chemlal	Morocco	8:43.57	
4	Adelino Monteiro	Portugal	8:45.34	
5	Martin Pröll	Austria	8:46.80	
6	Itay Magidi	Israel	8:51.26	
7	Jukka Keskisalo	Finland	8:53.18	
8	Rami Al-Faar	Saudi Arabia	8:53.48	
9	Grzegorz Walaszek	Poland	9:03.14	
10	Steffen Preuk	Germany	9:03.42	
11	Ion Luchianov	Moldova	9:16.32	
12	Jacob Selebalo	South Africa	9:22.20	

=== Heats ===
18 October

==== Heat 1 ====
Rank	Name	Nationality	Time	Notes
1	Raymond Yator	Kenya	8:35.76	Q
2	Jukka Keskisalo	Finland	8:52.46	Q
3	Martin Pröll	Austria	8:53.70	Q
4	Jacob Selebalo	South Africa	8:57.24	Q
5	Rami Al-Faar	Saudi Arabia	8:58.93	q
6	Steffen Preuk	Germany	9:01.03	q
7	Ali Tachour	Algeria	9:04.36	
8	Fernando Fernandes	Brazil	9:07.94	
9	Sebastián Pino	Chile	9:10.98	
10	Vadym Slobodenyuk	Ukraine	9:12.45	
11	Masataka Inaka	Japan	9:12.69	
12	Michaël André	France	9:14.78	
13	Luke Taylor	Australia	9:15.42	
14	Paul Morrice	New Zealand	9:21.67	
15	Mariano Mastromarino	Argentina	9:25.72	
16	Mircea Bogdan	Romania	9:40.80	
	Dimítrios Spiliópoulos	Greece	DNF	

==== Heat 2 ====
Rank	Name	Nationality	Time	Notes
1	David Chemweno	Kenya	8:51.34	Q
2	Abdelatif Chemlal	Morocco	8:51.45	Q
3	Adelino Monteiro	Portugal	8:53.03	Q
4	Grzegorz Walaszek	Poland	8:54.17	Q
5	Itay Magidi	Israel	8:54.78	q
6	Ion Luchianov	Moldova	8:55.19	q
7	Richard Jeremiah	Australia	9:05.43	
8	Hristóforos Meroúsis	Greece	9:09.55	
9	Erick Bonilla	El Salvador	9:16.25	
10	Sergio Lobos	Chile	9:18.67	
11	Moses Faku	South Africa	9:21.33	
12	Liam Reale	Ireland	9:24.28	
13	Missoum Azaïdj	Algeria	9:30.35	
14	Yuri Floriani	Italy	9:31.74	
	Saleh Al-Safhan	Saudi Arabia	DQ	IAAF rule 163.6
	Raphael Schäfer	Germany	DNF	
	José Correa	Argentina	DNF	

== Participation ==
According to an unofficial count, 34 athletes from 25 countries participated in the event.

- Algeria (2)
- Argentina (2)
- Australia (2)
- Austria (1)
- Brazil (1)
- Chile (2)
- El Salvador (1)
- Finland (1)
- France (1)
- Germany (2)
- Greece (2)
- Ireland (1)
- Israel (1)
- Italy (1)
- Japan (1)
- Kenya (2)
- Moldova (1)
- Morocco (1)
- New Zealand (1)
- Poland (1)
- Portugal (1)
- Romania (1)
- Saudi Arabia (2)
- South Africa (2)
- Ukraine (1)
