= Willy Komen (athlete) =

Kenyan steeplechase runner

Medal record

Men's athletics

Representing Kenya

African Championships
Bronze medal – third place	2008 Addis Ababa	3000 st.

Willy Rutto Komen (born 22 December 1987) is a Kenyan runner who specializes in the 3000 metres steeplechase.

== International competitions ==
Year	Competition	Venue	Position	Event	Notes
Representing Kenya
2006	World Junior Championships	Beijing, China	1st	3000 m s'chase	8:14.00
2007	All-Africa Games	Algiers, Algeria	1st	3000 m s'chase	8:15.11
2008	African Championships	Addis Ababa, Ethiopia	3rd	3000 m s'chase	8:41.98

== Personal bests ==
- 1500 metres – 3:40.0 min (2007)
- 3000 metres steeplechase – 8:11.18 min (2007)
