= Matira =

Matira is a village in Kapsowar division of the Marakwet District, Rift Valley Province, Kenya.

It is the birthplace of famous Kenyan steeplechase runner Ezekiel Kemboi.
