= Athletics at the 2006 Commonwealth Games – Men's 3000 metres steeplechase =

Men's 3000 metres steeplechase at the Commonwealth Games

The men's 3000 metres steeplechase event at the 2006 Commonwealth Games was held on March 24.

== Results ==
Rank	Name	Nationality	Time	Notes
1st place, gold medalist(s)	Ezekiel Kemboi	Kenya	8:18.17	
2nd place, silver medalist(s)	Wesley Kiprotich	Kenya	8:19.38	
3rd place, bronze medalist(s)	Reuben Kosgei	Kenya	8:19.82	
4	Martin Dent	Australia	8:28.98	PB
5	Stuart Stokes	England	8:29.94	SB
6	Peter Nowill	Australia	8:30.59	
7	Ruben Ramolefi	South Africa	8:35.91	
8	Matthew Kerr	Canada	8:38.97	
9	Adam Bowden	England	8:43.08	
10	Ali Mkhabela	South Africa	8:56.67	
11	Youcef Abdi	Australia	9:02.22	
12	Luke Gunn	England	9:08.02	
13	Sapolai Yao	Papua New Guinea	9:40.79	
	Kevin Sheppard	Scotland	DNF	
