= 2007 Asian Athletics Championships – Men's 3000 metres steeplechase =

The men's 3000 metres steeplechase event at the 2007 Asian Athletics Championships was held in Amman, Jordan on July 27.

== Results ==
Rank	Name	Nationality	Time	Notes
1st place, gold medalist(s)	Ali Ahmed Al-Amri	Saudi Arabia	8:40.25	
2nd place, silver medalist(s)	Zakrya Ali Kamil	Qatar	8:40.49	
3rd place, bronze medalist(s)	Moustafa Ahmed Shebto	Qatar	8:47.99	
4	Omid Mehrabi	Iran	9:11.11	
	Rene Herrera	Philippines	DNF	
	Bashar Al-Kufrini	Jordan	DNF	
	Khadair Montaser	Palestine	DNF	
