= Walter Dix =

American sprinter (born 1986)

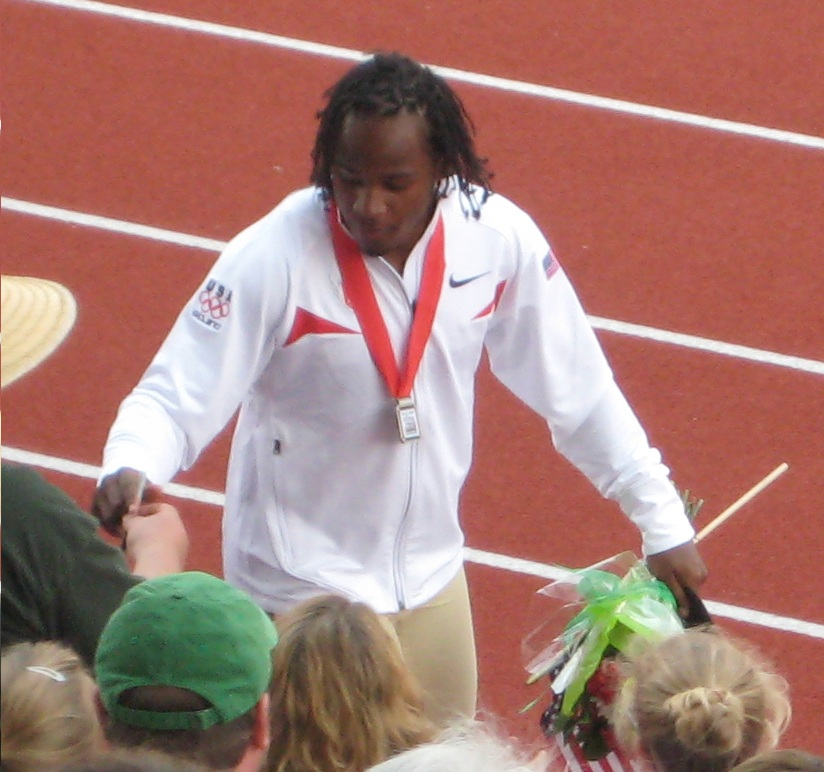
- Dix at the Olympic Trials 2008

Personal information
- Born: January 31, 1986 (age 40) Coral Springs, Florida, U.S.
- Height: 5 ft 9 in (175 cm)
- Weight: 190 lb (86 kg)

Sport
- Sport: Running
- Events: 100 meters, 200 meters
- College team: Florida State Seminoles
- Club: Unattached

Achievements and titles
- Personal bests: 100m: 9.88 s (Nottwil 2010); 200m: 19.53 s (Brussels 2011)
Medal record
Men's athletics
Representing the United States
Olympic Games
Bronze medal – third place	2008 Beijing	100 m
Bronze medal – third place	2008 Beijing	200 m
World Championships
Silver medal – second place	2011 Daegu	100 m
Silver medal – second place	2011 Daegu	200 m

Walter Dix (born January 31, 1986) is a retired American sprinter who specialized in the 100 meters and 200 meters. He is the eighth-fastest 200-meter runner ever with a best of 19.53 seconds, and has broken the 10-second barrier in the 100 meters, with a best of 9.88 (9.80w) seconds. He was the only track athlete from USA to win 2 individual medals at the 2008 Summer Olympics in Beijing.

Dix was a highly successful amateur athlete, setting a state record in the 100 m and trying out for the US Olympic Team at the age of eighteen. He joined Florida State University and in his first year he broke the 100 m American junior record and won at the NCAA Outdoor Championships. After a fourth-place finish at the 2005 US Championships, Dix continued with his collegiate success, setting an NCAA record of 19.69 seconds in the 200 m and coming within one hundredth of the 100 m record. He completed a 100 m, 200 m, and 4 × 100 metres relay sweep at the 2007 NCAA Outdoor Championships, the first to do so since John Carlos in 1969. He closed his amateur career in 2008: another NCAA 200 m title made him the third most decorated track athlete in NCAA history, and he won gold and silver at the 2008 US Olympic Trials. He was the only track athlete from USA to win 2 individual Olympic medals in Beijing.

Dix turned professional in mid-2008, signing a multimillion-dollar contract with Nike. He reached the Olympic finals in the 100 and 200 m, and won two bronze medals; the only American track athlete to win two individual medals at the 2008 Summer Olympics. He suffered an injury at the 2009 US Championships, thus missing out on the World Championships, and a contract dispute with his agent resulted in only a handful of appearances that season. In 2011 he was both the 100 and 200 m American champion and won silver medals in the events at the 2011 World Championships. Injuries at the 2012 US Olympic Trials and 2013 USA Championships meant he missed a second Olympic and 2013 World Championships appearance.

== Early life ==
The son of a track and field coach, Walter Dix competed at athletics meetings from a young age, specializing in sprinting and the long jump. His speed also translated well to the football field, and he often played the sport at school. Dix was an accomplished high school runner: in his final year at Coral Springs High School in 2004 he recorded 10.28 seconds in the 100 meters, then third all-time on the Florida high school record list behind only Houston McTear and Curtis Johnson, and broke the 200 meters Florida high school record with 20.62 seconds. Aside from J-Mee Samuels' 10.28 seconds in the 100 m, these were the two fastest marks by a high school athlete that year. Both these times were within the Olympic standard for the events. He competed at the US Olympic Trials in the 200 m, but did not progress beyond the heats stage.

== College track athletics ==
He began attending Florida State University (FSU) in late 2004, working with coach Bob Braman. At his first regional meeting for the university, he won the 60-meter dash, 200 m and 4×400 meter relay, and was chosen as the Atlantic Coast Conference rookie of the year. He made his first major impact at the NCAA Indoor Championships: after a sixth-place finish in the 60 m, he came second in the 200 m with a world junior record of 20.37 s, beaten only by Wallace Spearmon. Following this, he became USA Track & Field's Athlete of the Week after setting an American junior record in the 100 m. Running in the Icahn Stadium at the 2005 NCAA East Regional Championships, his heat-winning time of 10.06 seconds bettered Stanley Floyd's 25-year-old mark. Dix went on to win the 100 m final and also won the 200 m in 20.23 seconds, the fourth fastest time by an American junior sprinter.

At his first NCAA Outdoor Championships, Dix became FSU's first winner at the championships since 1980, and the first to do so as a freshman. He won the 100 m in 10.21 seconds, beating the defending NCAA champions DaBryan Blanton and Tyson Gay to the title. After recording a personal best of 20.18 seconds in the semifinals, he managed a fourth-place finish in the 200 m race. Dix competed at his first USA senior championships that year and, as the only amateur to reach the 100 m final, finished fourth. The only athletes to beat him were Leonard Scott, reigning Olympic Champion Shawn Crawford and the eventual world champion Justin Gatlin.

=== Multiple NCAA champion ===
Dix's second year at FSU was characterised by success in the 200 m. He won his first indoor NCAA title in the 200 m and was runner-up in the 60 m, having set a personal best of 6.59 seconds in the heats. His time of 20.27 seconds in the 200 m final was the fastest indoor run in the world that year. His fastest of the season came at the Reebok invitational and his time of 20.25 seconds placed him as the 13th fastest runner in 2006. He completed a 200 m NCAA Championship double by taking the outdoor title, and he also finished as runner-up in the 100 m, second to Xavier Carter.

In his third year as an FSU athlete he won four NCAA Division I titles, starting with a 200 m win indoors. In the 2007 NCAA East Regional final, he won the 100 m dash in 10.05 seconds. His performance in the 200 m was more impressive however: he set the all-time collegiate record of 19.69 seconds in the 200 m, breaking Joe DeLoach's record that had stood since 1988. This made him the sixth fastest 200 m runner ever and it was the seventh fastest run in history at the time.

At the NCAA Outdoor Championships that year, he won three separate national titles, beating all opposition in the 100 m, 200 m, and 4×100 meter relay races. This achievement made him the first man to win the three races at an NCAA Championships since John Carlos did so in 1969. Dix's time of 9.93 seconds in the 100 m was a world-leader at that point of the season, and was just 0.01 behind Ato Boldon's NCAA record. For these accomplishments, he was again named USATF's Athlete of the Week.

In his final year as an amateur athlete, he spent much of early 2008 battling a hamstring injury. However, he returned in April to win his third 200 m NCAA outdoor title, while placing fourth in the 100 m. Although his personal bests rivalled those of top professional athletes, Dix decided to finish his degree in social science at FSU, as his graduation in May 2008 allowed him to focus on the Olympic Trials thereafter.

Over the course of his college career, Dix became only the second athlete to win three NCAA 200 m outdoor titles (after Ralph Metcalfe) and, with six outdoor NCAA titles, he is listed as the joint third on all-time list. Furthermore, he finished with two indoor titles and 18 All-American honors.

== Professional career ==
=== 2008 Olympic Games ===
Competing at the 2008 US Olympic Trials in Eugene, Oregon, Dix qualified for the 2008 Summer Olympics in both the 100 and 200 m events. After recording a personal-best-equaling 9.93 seconds in the 100 m semifinals, he took second place behind Tyson Gay with a wind-assisted 9.80 seconds. He stated that his NCAA experience had helped raise his confidence and that he was less nervous than he was at the 2005 US Championships. The 200 m favorite Gay suffered an injury in the qualifying rounds, and Dix and Crawford both finished the 200 m final with 19.86 seconds, with Dix elected the winner by a photo finish. After signing a sponsorship deal with Nike worth around $1,000,000 a year, described by his agent as "the largest deal ever for a track athlete just coming out of college", Dix stated that his aims for the Olympics were personal bests in the individual sprints and a gold in the relay race.

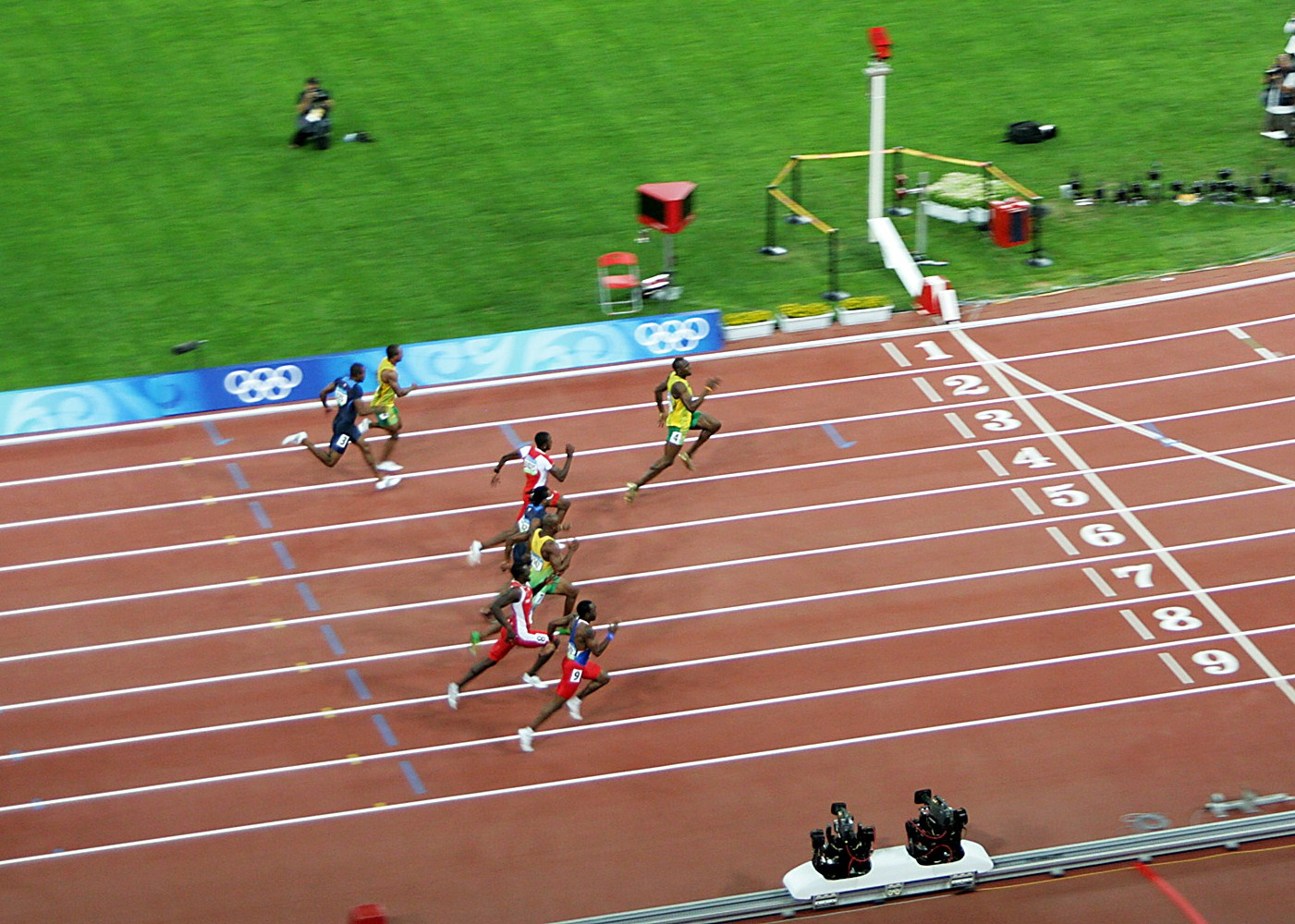
The 2008 Olympic 100 m final, with Usain Bolt leading and Dix in blue (center).

Competing in his first Olympics, Dix qualified for the 100 m final with a season's best of 9.95 seconds. In the final he registered a personal best of 9.91 seconds, finishing behind new world record holder Usain Bolt of Jamaica and Richard Thompson of Trinidad and Tobago. The Olympic bronze medal was Dix's first medal at a major international competition.

A few days later, he finished fifth in the 200 m final with a time of 19.98 seconds, some distance off the winner Usain Bolt who had broken the world record. However, it transpired that both the silver and bronze medalists (Churandy Martina of the Netherlands Antilles and American Wallace Spearmon) had stepped out of their lanes thus they were disqualified. As a result, Dix received his second Olympic bronze medal. Further disqualifications occurred in the heats of the Olympic 4×100 meter relay race: Darvis Patton and Tyson Gay misjudged a baton pass, causing the American team to be eliminated and spoiling any chance of Dix receiving a relay medal. He finished the Olympics as the only American sprinter to medal in two individual events. Dix closed the season with two sub-10 second runs at the Weltklasse and Athletissima meetings, finishing second to a Jamaican on both occasions (Bolt and Asafa Powell).

=== Low-key 2009 ===
The year after the Olympics, Dix began the season with a world-leading time of 10.00 seconds in Tallahassee in April. He also set a world-leading relay time of 37.92 seconds with Travis Padgett, Shawn Crawford and Darvis Patton at the Penn Relays. However, he failed to maintain this strong form through the rest of 2009. Coach Teddy Long planned to improve Dix's start and acceleration in his races, but the two parted company in April. He placed third behind Michael Rodgers and Asafa Powell at the Prefontaine Classic but, unusually, this proved to one of the highlights of a low-profile year for Dix. He competed at the US Championships, but injuries forced him out of both the 100 m and 200 m races and he did not qualify for the World Championships. Furthermore, he entered a legal battle with his management company, regarding whether they merited the 20% portion of his multimillion-dollar sponsorship contract with Nike. The dispute with his agent Kimberly Holland was resolved in July: although the terms were undisclosed, Dix left Holland's Icon Management and decided to be his own agent. With his father as his coach, a legal battle and no major races to prepare for, Dix ran only a handful of local meetings in the rest of 2009.

=== Return to top level ===
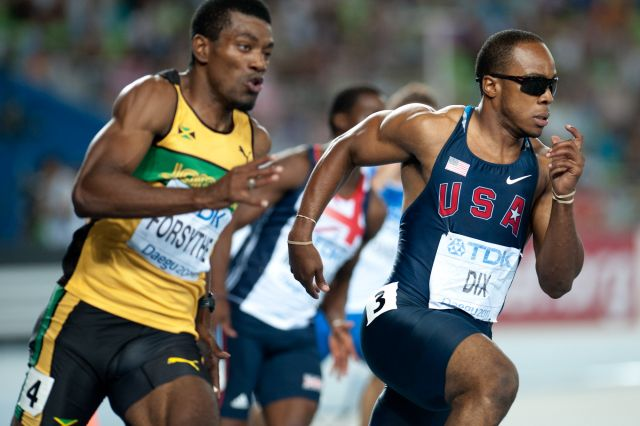
Dix beating Mario Forsythe in the 200 m at the 2011 World Championships

Dix returned to national competition with an appearance at the 2010 USA Indoor Track and Field Championships. He took fourth place in the final and set a new 60 m indoor best of 6.58 seconds. Event winner Ivory Williams was disqualified after testing positive for marijuana and Dix was upgraded to third. He opened his outdoor season at the Seminole Twilight meet in May, recording 9.98 seconds in the 100 m and 19.89 seconds for the 200 m. He began to participate in Diamond League meetings, competing on the European circuit for the first time. He beat Wallace Spearmon at the Golden Gala's 200 m race, breaking Michael Johnson's meet record. He also took to the national stage, winning the 100 m and finishing as the 200 m runner-up at the 2010 USA Outdoor Track and Field Championships. A week later, Dix beat Tyson Gay at the Prefontaine Classic for another meet record of 19.72 seconds. In August at a meet in Nottwil, Switzerland, Dix ran a new personal best of 9.88 seconds, finishing second behind Nesta Carter who also set a new personal best of 9.86 seconds. An injury at the London Grand Prix brought an end to his season.

In the first meeting of the 2011 IAAF Diamond League, at the Qatar Athletic Super Grand Prix, he won the 200 m with a time of 20.06 seconds. Dix took further 200 m victories at the Eugene and London legs of the series, while Usain Bolt won the other three 200 m mid-season legs. He achieved a 100/200 sprint double at the 2011 USA Track and Field Championships, winning in the absence of Tyson Gay and Wallace Spearmon. Running in both the events at the 2011 World Championships in Athletics, he first secured the silver medal in the 100 m final – defending champion Bolt was disqualified for a false start and Dix was runner-up to another Jamaican, Yohan Blake, in a comparatively slow 10.08 seconds. In the 200-meter final Bolt beat the field but Dix was the closest to him, running 19.70 seconds to take his second silver of the tournament. He attempted to gain a third medal in the 4 × 100 metres relay final, but a mid-race collision between Darvis Patton and Britain's Harry Aikines-Aryeetey meant the American team's baton never reached Dix's final leg. At the Memorial Van Damme Diamond League final, Dix clocked a personal best of 19.53 seconds in the 200 m. Although Blake won the race in 19.26 seconds, Dix's performance made him the fourth-fastest runner in history and he won the overall league title.

He moved to Southern Ireland in 2012 to train with John Smith and opened his outdoor season with a wind-aided run of 9.85 seconds. A 200 m win followed at the Doha Diamond League meet. He entered the 2012 US Olympic Trials and reached the 100 m final but, having pulled his left hamstring in his semi-final, he finished last in the race. This brought an end to his season.

=== Later career ===
Dix started the 2013 season with a 100 m win at the Oxy Invite, running 10.11. On June 1, he ran to 2nd place at the 2013 Prefontaine Classic in the 200 m with a time of 20.16, behind Nickel Ashmeade. However, at the 2013 USA Outdoor Championships, he was hampered by the same muscle as the year before and pulled up in the race. He returned in September and ran a season's best of 20.12 in the 200 m at the 2013 Memorial Van Damme Diamond League meeting. A few days later, he won the 100 m with a 9.99 during the 2013 Rieti Meeting.

== Personal life ==
Walter Dix is the son of Washington and Plinnie Dix. His father, a former sprinter, is an assistant principal and track coach at New River Middle School, while his mother is a high school teacher. He has two older brothers, Alex and William, who also were track runners. While attending Florida State University, Dix became a member of the Phi Beta Sigma fraternity.

== Personal bests ==
As of 2026, Dix's best in the 200 m outdoors makes him the eighth fastest of all time, while his indoor best for the distance makes him the twenty-sixth fastest. His best in the 100 m is tied the eighteenth fastest by an American athlete.

Event	Best	Venue	Date	Ref
55 meters (indoor)	6.19 s	Gainesville, Florida	January 13, 2007	
60 meters (indoor)	6.58 s A	Albuquerque, New Mexico	February 28, 2010	
100 meters	9.88 s	Nottwil, Switzerland	August 9, 2010	
200 meters	19.53 s	Brussels, Belgium	September 16, 2011	
200 meters (indoor)	20.27 s	Fayetteville, Arkansas	March 10, 2006	
Long jump	7.39 meters	Gainesville, Florida	March 26, 2004	

- All information from IAAF Profile

== Major competition record ==
Year	Competition	Venue	Position	Event	Notes
2008	Olympic Games	Beijing, China	3rd	100 m	9.91
2008	Olympic Games	Beijing, China	3rd	200 m	19.98
2011	World Championships	Daegu, South Korea	2nd	100 m	10.08
2011	World Championships	Daegu, South Korea	2nd	200 m	19.70

== Circuit wins and national titles ==
- Diamond League (200 m)
  - Overall winner: 2011
  - Rome: 2010
  - Eugene: 2010, 2011
  - Lausanne: 2010
  - Gateshead: 2010
  - Doha: 2011, 2012
  - London: 2011
- U.S. Championships
  - 100 m: 2010, 2011
  - 200 m: 2008, 2011
- NCAA Division I Championships
  - 100 m: 2005, 2007
  - 200 m: 2006, 2007, 2008
  - 4×100 m relay: 2007
- NCAA Division I Indoor Championships
  - 200 m: 2006, 2007

Awards and achievements
Preceded by Tyson Gay	Best Track and Field Athlete ESPY Award; 2012	Succeeded by discontinued
