= Hachlaf =

Hachlaf is a surname. Notable people with the surname include:

- Abdelkader Hachlaf (born 1978), Moroccan middle-distance runner
- Halima Hachlaf (born 1988), Moroccan middle-distance runner
