= Jakub Czaja =

Polish steeplechase runner

Personal information
- Born: 12 September 1980 (age 46) Gdańsk, Poland

Sport
- Sport: Track and field
Medal record
Representing Poland
Summer Universiade
Silver medal – second place	2001 Beijing	3000m steeplechase
European Junior Championships
Gold medal – first place	1999 Riga	3000m steeplechase

Jakub Czaja (born 12 September 1980) is a retired Polish athlete who specialised in the 3000 metres steeplechase. He represented his country at the 2004 Summer Olympics failing to qualify for the final. His biggest success is the silver medal at the 2001 Summer Universiade.

== Competition record ==
Year	Competition	Venue	Position	Event	Notes
Representing Poland
1999	European Junior Championships	Riga, Latvia	1st	3000 m s'chase	8:41.91
2001	European U23 Championships	Amsterdam, Netherlands	3rd (h)	3000 m s'chase	8:42.55
2001	Universiade	Beijing, China	2nd	3000 m s'chase	8:23.00
2002	European Championships	Munich, Germany	19th (h)	3000 m s'chase	8:42.25
2004	Olympic Games	Athens, Greece	38th (h)	3000 m s'chase	8:56.24
2005	World Championships	Helsinki, Finland	–	3000 m s'chase	DNF

== Personal bests ==
Outdoor

- 1500 metres – 3:44.19 (Kraków 2003)
- 3000 metres – 7:53.92 (Warsaw 2004)
- 5000 metres – 13:46.53 (Firenze 2005)
- 10,000 metres – 28:56.50 (Międzyzdroje 2005)
- 3000 metres steeplechase – 8:17.49 (Paris Saint-Denis 2005)

Indoor

- 1500 metres – 3:47.42 (Spała 2004)
- 3000 metres – 8:03.53 (Spała 2002)
