= 2008 African Championships in Athletics – Men's 3000 metres steeplechase =

The men's 3000 metres steeplechase event at the 2008 African Championships in Athletics was held at the Addis Ababa Stadium on May 2.

== Results ==
Rank	Name	Nationality	Time	Notes
1st place, gold medalist(s)	Richard Mateelong	Kenya	8:31.68	
2nd place, silver medalist(s)	Michael Kipyego	Kenya	8:32.94	
3rd place, bronze medalist(s)	Willy Komen	Kenya	8:41.98	
4	Nahom Mesfin Tariku	Ethiopia	8:50.21	
5	Legese Lamiso	Ethiopia	8:51.43	
6	Dereje Abdi	Ethiopia	8:54.74	
7	Ruben Ramolefi	South Africa	9:09.63	
8	Tshamano Setone	South Africa	9:12.05	
9	Simon Ayeko	Uganda	9:23.64	
	Brahim Taleb	Morocco	DNF	
	Abdelkader Hachlaf	Morocco	DNS	
