= Pavel Potapovich =

Russian steeplechase runner

Personal information
- Born: 26 November 1980 (age 45) Peresady, Minsk Region, Soviet Union

Sport
- Sport: Track and field
Medal record
Representing Russia
European U23 Championships
Gold medal – first place	2001 Amsterdam	3000m steeplechase

Pavel Vladimirovich Potapovich (Russian: Павел Владимирович Потапович; born 26 November 1980) is a Russian track and field athlete who mainly competes in the 3000 metres steeplechase.

== International competitions ==
Year	Competition	Venue	Position	Event	Notes
Representing Russia
2001	European U23 Championships	Amsterdam, Netherlands	1st	3000 m steeplechase	8:35.85
2001	Universiade	Beijing, China	13th	3000 m steeplechase	8:50.46
2003	World Championships	Paris, France	33rd (h)	3000 m steeplechase	8:38.63
2004	Olympic Games	Athens, Greece	37th (h)	3000 m steeplechase	8:52.65
2006	European Championships	Gothenburg, Sweden	10th	3000 m steeplechase	8:38.19
2006	World Cup	Athens, Greece	6th	3000 m steeplechase	8:38.95
2008	Olympic Games	Beijing, China	29th (h)	3000 m steeplechase	8:36.29
