= 2001 European Athletics U23 Championships – Men's 3000 metres steeplechase =

The men's 3000 metres steeplechase event at the 2001 European Athletics U23 Championships was held in Amsterdam, Netherlands, at Olympisch Stadion on 12 and 14 July.

== Medalists ==
Gold	Pavel Potapovich; Russia
Silver	Vadim Slobodenyuk; Ukraine
Bronze	Henrik Skoog; Sweden

== Results ==
=== Final ===
14 July

Rank	Name	Nationality	Time	Notes
1st place, gold medalist(s)	Pavel Potapovich	Russia	8:35.85	
2nd place, silver medalist(s)	Vadim Slobodenyuk	Ukraine	8:37.09	
3rd place, bronze medalist(s)	Henrik Skoog	Sweden	8:38.27	
4	Tuomo Lehtinen	Finland	8:38.91	
5	Martin Pröll	Austria	8:39.85	
6	Máté Németh	Hungary	8:41.42	
7	Boštjan Buč	Slovenia	8:41.82	
8	Enric Segura	Spain	8:45.07	
9	Vincent Zouaoui	France	8:46.40	
10	Grzegorz Walaszek	Poland	8:48.34	
11	Filmon Ghirmai	Germany	8:49.49	
	Jakub Czaja	Poland	DNF	

=== Heats ===
12 July
Qualified: first 4 in each heat and 4 best to the Final

==== Heat 1 ====
Rank	Name	Nationality	Time	Notes
1	Máté Németh	Hungary	8:44.61	Q
2	Henrik Skoog	Sweden	8:44.79	Q
3	Pavel Potapovich	Russia	8:44.99	Q
4	Grzegorz Walaszek	Poland	8:45.60	Q
5	Martin Pröll	Austria	8:45.64	q
6	Raúl Moya	Spain	8:46.38	
7	Yuri Floriani	Italy	8:52.30	
8	Kevin Paulsen	France	8:57.23	
9	Adrián Peña	Spain	8:59.12	
10	Ian Murdoch	Ireland	9:01.00	
11	Stephan Hohl	Germany	9:01.65	
12	Ion Luchianov	Moldova	9:05.31	
13	Nordine Gezzar	France	9:06.59	

==== Heat 2 ====
Rank	Name	Nationality	Time	Notes
1	Vadim Slobodenyuk	Ukraine	8:36.74	Q
2	Tuomo Lehtinen	Finland	8:40.75	Q
3	Jakub Czaja	Poland	8:42.55	Q
4	Boštjan Buč	Slovenia	8:43.11	Q
5	Vincent Zouaoui	France	9:43.80	q
6	Enric Segura	Spain	8:44.55	q
7	Filmon Ghirmai	Germany	8:45.05	q
8	Georgios Kobogiannis	Greece	8:49.31	
9	Andrew Franklin	United Kingdom	8:54.39	
10	Adelino Monteiro	Portugal	8:54.70	
11	Kaupo Tislär	Estonia	8:59.86	
12	Koen Wilssens	Belgium	9:09.96	
13	Pétér Weisz	Hungary	9:24.73	

== Participation ==
According to an unofficial count, 26 athletes from 19 countries participated in the event.

- Austria (1)
- Belgium (1)
- Estonia (1)
- Finland (1)
- France (3)
- Germany (2)
- Greece (1)
- Hungary (2)
- Ireland (1)
- Italy (1)
- Moldova (1)
- Poland (2)
- Portugal (1)
- Russia (1)
- Spain (3)
- Slovenia (1)
- Sweden (1)
- Ukraine (1)
- United Kingdom (1)
