= Moustafa Ahmed Shebto =

Qatari-Ugandan long-distance runner

Medal record

Men's athletics

Representing Qatar

Asian Championships
| Silver medal – second place | 2005 Incheon | 3000 m st. |
| Bronze medal – third place | 2007 Amman | 3000 m st. |

Moustafa Ahmed Shebto (Arabic: مصطفى أحمد شبتو, born Patrick Cheboto on July 4, 1986, in Kaproron, Uganda) is a long-distance runner now representing Qatar. Shebto was recruited along with other African runners.

His special distance is 3000 metres steeplechase, a distance in which he competed at the 2005 World Championships.
