= Zakrya Ali Kamil =

Qatari long-distance runner

Medal record

Men's athletics

Representing Qatar

Asian Championships
Silver medal – second place	2007 Amman	3000 m st.

Zakrya Ali Kamil (born 25 March 1988) is a retired Qatari long-distance runner who specialized in the 3000 metres steeplechase.

He competed at the 2007 World Championships without reaching the final. At the regional level, he won the silver medal at the 2007 Asian Championships and finished tenth at the 2010 Asian Games.

His personal best time was 8:25.41 minutes, achieved in July 2008 in Tanger.
