= Athletics at the 2001 Summer Universiade – Men's 3000 metres steeplechase =

The men's 3000 metres steeplechase event at the 2001 Summer Universiade was held in Beijing, China on 29 August.

== Results ==
Rank	Athlete	Nationality	Time	Notes
1st place, gold medalist(s)	Anthony Famiglietti	United States	8:21.97	
2nd place, silver medalist(s)	Jakub Czaja	Poland	8:23.00	
3rd place, bronze medalist(s)	Christian Belz	Switzerland	8:24.46	
4	Aziz Driouche	Morocco	8:25.69	
5	Yoshitaka Iwamizu	Japan	8:27.66	
6	Roman Usov	Russia	8:35.08	
7	José María González	Spain	8:36.75	
8	Wu Wen-chien	Chinese Taipei	8:40.25	
9	Mircea Bogdan	Romania	8:42.04	
10	Steve Slattery	United States	8:43.38	
11	Peter Nowill	Australia	8:44.57	
12	Alberto Álvarez	Spain	8:48.22	
13	Pavel Potapovich	Russia	8:50.46	
14	Iaroslav Muşinschi	Moldova	8:53.74	
15	Francisco Gómez	Costa Rica	8:56.23	
16	Giuseppe Maffei	Italy	9:00.15	
17	David Milne	Canada	9:03.21	
18	Markus Hagmann	Switzerland	9:15.28	
19	Greg Derbyshire	New Zealand	9:16.27	
20	Joel Kgokong	South Africa	9:17.97	
21	Selvin Molineros	Guatemala	9:33.42	
