= Mircea Bogdan =

Romanian athletics competitor

Personal information
- Born: 5 June 1982 (age 44)

Sport
- Sport: Track and field
Medal record
Representing Romania
European Junior Championships
Silver medal – second place	2001 Grosseto	3000m steeplechase

Mircea Florin Bogdan (born 5 June 1982) is a retired Romanian long-distance runner who specialized in the 3000 metres steeplechase.

As a junior he won the silver medal at the 2001 European Junior Championships and finished seventh at the 2001 Summer Universiade. He placed lowly at the 2001 World Cross Country Championships, and competed at the 2000 World Junior Championships and the 2003 European U23 Championships without reaching the final. Studying in the United States, he won the NCAA Division I Championships of 2005, representing UTEP.

As a senior he competed in the 3000 metres at the 2007 European Indoor Championships, the steeplechase at the 2007 World Championships and in the 1500 metres at the 2008 World Indoor Championships without reaching the final. He became Romanian champion three times. His personal best steeplechase time was 8:23.12 minutes, achieved in April 2007 in Palo Alto.

Bogdan has coached for the UTEP Miners, Western Illinois Leathernecks, Chicago State Cougars, Loyola Ramblers, and Chapman Panthers track and field programs.
