= Athletics at the 2007 All-Africa Games – Men's 3000 metres steeplechase =

The men's 3000 meters steeplechase at the 2007 All-Africa Games was held on July 18.

== Results ==
| Rank | Name | Nationality | Time | Notes |
|---|---|---|---|---|
| 1st place, gold medalist(s) | Willy Komen | Kenya | 8:15.11 | |
| 2nd place, silver medalist(s) | Ezekiel Kemboi | Kenya | 8:16.93 | |
| 3rd place, bronze medalist(s) | Nahom Mesfin | Ethiopia | 8:17.21 | |
| 4 | Elijah Chelimo | Kenya | 8:18.13 | |
| 5 | Roba Gari | Ethiopia | 8:28.43 | |
| 6 | Rabie Makhloufi | Algeria | 8:32.41 | |
| 7 | Benjamin Kiplagat | Uganda | 8:34.83 | |
| 8 | Ruben Ramolefi | South Africa | 8:45.15 | |
| 9 | Emmanuel Mchabela | South Africa | 8:45.48 | |
| 10 | Moussa Youssef Idris | Sudan | 8:47.86 | |
| 11 | Alphonso Primo | South Africa | 9:26.15 | |
