= 2010 African Championships in Athletics – Men's 3000 metres steeplechase =

The men's 3000 metres steeplechase at the 2010 African Championships in Athletics were held on July 30.

== Results ==
Rank	Name	Nationality	Time	Notes
1st place, gold medalist(s)	Richard Mateelong	Kenya	8:23.54	
2nd place, silver medalist(s)	Ezekiel Kemboi	Kenya	8:26.13	
3rd place, bronze medalist(s)	Roba Gari	Ethiopia	8:27.15	
4	Nahom Mesfen	Ethiopia	8:30.25	
5	Benjamin Kiplagat	Uganda	8:32.03	
6	Abraham Cherono	Kenya	8:35.92	
7	Ben Siwa	Uganda	8:39.43	
8	Simon Ayeko	Uganda	8:47.90	
9	Legease Lamisso	Ethiopia	8:48.06	
10	Ezechiel Nizigiyimana	Burundi	9:08.30	
	Edwin Molepo	South Africa	DQ	
	Gervais Hakizimana	Rwanda	DNS	
