= Peter Nowill =

Australian long-distance runner

Personal information
- Born: 15 June 1979 (age 47) Brisbane, Australia

Sport
- Sport: Track and field

Peter Joseph Nowill (born 15 June 1979) is an Australian long-distance runner who competed in the 2004 Summer Olympics.

== Competition record ==
| Year | Competition | Venue | Position | Event | Notes |
Representing Australia
| 2001 | Summer Universiade | Beijing, China | 11th | 3000 m s'chase | 8:44.57 |
| 2003 | World Championships | Paris, France | 24th (h) | 3000 m s'chase | 8:26.22 |
| 2004 | Olympic Games | Athens, Greece | 24th (h) | 3000 m s'chase | 8:29.14 |
| 2005 | World Championships | Helsinki, Finland | 30th (h) | 3000 m s'chase | 8:35.35 |
| 2006 | Commonwealth Games | Melbourne, Australia | 6th | 3000 m s'chase | 8:30.59 |
