= Bisluke Kiplagat =

Kenyan middle-distance runner

Bisluke Kipkorir Kiplagat (born 8 August 1988) is a Kenyan middle-distance runner who specializes in the 3000 metres steeplechase.

== Achievements ==
Year	Competition	Venue	Position	Event	Notes
Representing Kenya
2005	World Youth Championships	Marrakesh, Morocco	2nd	2000 m s'chase	5:24.87
2006	World Junior Championships	Beijing, China	2nd	3000m s'chase	8:18.11
2007	World Athletics Final	Stuttgart, Germany	10th	3000 m	8:07.01

=== Personal bests ===
- 1500 metres – 3:38.19 min (2006)
- 3000 metres – 7:44.62 min (2007)
- 3000 metres steeplechase – 8:18.11 min (2006)
