= 2008 World Junior Championships in Athletics – Men's 3000 metres steeplechase =

The men's 3000 metres steeplechase event at the 2008 World Junior Championships in Athletics was held in Bydgoszcz, Poland, at Zawisza Stadium on 10 and 13 July.

== Medalists ==
Gold	Jonathan Ndiku; Kenya
Silver	Benjamin Kiplagat; Uganda
Bronze	Patrick Terer; Kenya

== Results ==
=== Final ===
13 July

Rank	Name	Nationality	Time	Notes
1st place, gold medalist(s)	Jonathan Ndiku	Kenya	8:17.28	
2nd place, silver medalist(s)	Benjamin Kiplagat	Uganda	8:19.24	
3rd place, bronze medalist(s)	Patrick Terer	Kenya	8:25.14	
4	Dereje Abdi	Ethiopia	8:32.98	
5	Legese Lamiso	Ethiopia	8:38.34	
6	Abdel Ghani Aït Bahmad	Morocco	8:45.45	
7	Krystian Zalewski	Poland	8:45.64	
8	Majid Saleh Bashir	Bahrain	8:49.27	
9	Dylan Knight	United States	8:52.90	
10	Curtis Carr	United States	8:53.79	
11	Alexandru Ghinea	Romania	8:55.28	
12	Luis Orta	Venezuela	9:03.69	

=== Heats ===
10 July

==== Heat 1 ====
Rank	Name	Nationality	Time	Notes
1	Legese Lamiso	Ethiopia	8:48.61	Q
2	Benjamin Kiplagat	Uganda	8:49.17	Q
3	Patrick Terer	Kenya	8:50.03	Q
4	Alexandru Ghinea	Romania	8:52.63	Q
5	Luis Orta	Venezuela	8:52.70	q
6	Dylan Knight	United States	8:53.67	q
7	Sebastian Martos	Spain	8:57.85	
8	Mohamed Mahcene	Algeria	9:06.03	
9	Steven Jardin	France	9:07.00	
10	Eduardo Gregório	Uruguay	9:19.70	
11	Andreas Van Ham	Belgium	9:32.13	

==== Heat 2 ====
Rank	Name	Nationality	Time	Notes
1	Jonathan Ndiku	Kenya	8:42.32	Q
2	Dereje Abdi	Ethiopia	8:42.46	Q
3	Abdel Ghani Aït Bahmad	Morocco	8:48.05	Q
4	Krystian Zalewski	Poland	8:48.94	Q
5	Majid Saleh Bashir	Bahrain	8:51.31	q
6	Curtis Carr	United States	8:55.28	q
7	Matthew Hughes	Canada	9:01.82	
8	Abdelatif Hadjam	France	9:10.32	
9	Jonathan Hernández	Spain	9:16.77	
10	Jorge Cruz	Portugal	9:23.36	

== Participation ==
According to an unofficial count, 21 athletes from 16 countries participated in the event.

- Algeria (1)
- Bahrain (1)
- Belgium (1)
- Canada (1)
- Ethiopia (2)
- France (2)
- Kenya (2)
- Morocco (1)
- Poland (1)
- Portugal (1)
- Romania (1)
- Spain (2)
- Uganda (1)
- United States (2)
- Uruguay (1)
- Venezuela (1)
