= 2004 African Championships in Athletics – Men's 3000 metres steeplechase =

The men's 3000 metres steeplechase event at the 2004 African Championships in Athletics was held in Brazzaville, Republic of the Congo on July 14.

== Results ==
Rank	Name	Nationality	Time	Notes
1st place, gold medalist(s)	David Chemweno	Kenya	8:17.31	
2nd place, silver medalist(s)	Richard Mateelong	Kenya	8:26.34	
3rd place, bronze medalist(s)	Abdelatif Chemlal	Morocco	8:31.01	
4	Hamid Ezzine	Morocco	8:32.14	
5	Ruben Ramolefi	South Africa	8:50.95	
6	Emmanuel Mkhabela	South Africa	8:55.41	
7	Petrus Sithole	South Africa	9:03.02	
