= Benjamin Kiplagat =

Ugandan long-distance runner (1989–2023)

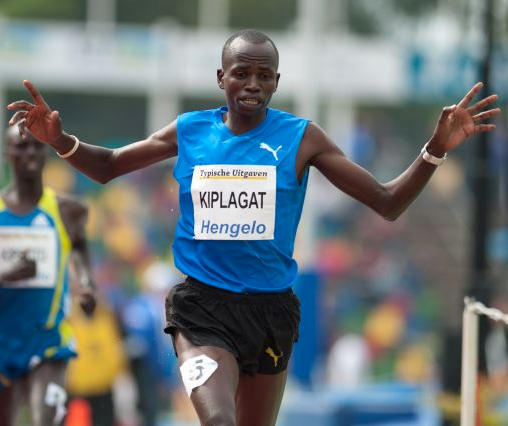
- Kiplagat in 2010

Personal information
- Born: 4 March 1989 Magoro, Uganda
- Died: 31 December 2023 (aged 34) Eldoret, Kenya
- Occupation: Long-distance runner
Medal record
Men's athletics
Representing Uganda
African Championships
| Bronze medal – third place | 2012 Porto-Novo | 3000 m st. |

Benjamin Kiplagat (4 March 1989 – 31 December 2023) was a Ugandan long-distance runner specialising in the 3000 metres steeplechase.

== Life ==
Kiplagat took up running following the success of Boniface Kiprop, who is from the same village as Kiplagat was, in the 2004 World Junior Championships. He began by competing in the 10,000 metres, but on the advice of his coach, he dropped down to the 1500 and 5000 m.

Kiplagat made his international debut at the 2006 World Cross Country Championships, having qualified by finishing 6th in the Ugandan Junior Cross Country Championships. That year he also qualified for the World Junior Championships. There, he set a new national junior record of 8:35.77, which he then lowered to 8:34.14 in the final, where he finished 6th.

In 2008, Kiplagat finished 4th in the World Cross Country Championships. That year, he lowered the Uganda record to 8:16.06 and then 8:14.29 before finishing second in the World Junior Championships.

Kiplagat's 2009 season was disrupted by malaria and typhoid, but he still managed to further lower the Ugandan national record to 8:12.98. He was again affected by malaria, and a boil on his leg, in 2010, but again lowered the Ugandan record to 8:03.81. He finished 4th at the 2010 Commonwealth Games.

Kiplagat was reported to have been stabbed to death, after his body was found in a car on 31 December 2023, near Eldoret in Kenya. Two men were subsequently arrested in connection to the murder; one of them had the suspected murder weapon on his person.

== International competitions ==
| Year | Competition | Venue | Position | Event | Notes |
Representing Uganda
| 2006 | World Cross Country Championships | Fukuoka, Japan | 50th | Short race (4 km) | 11:31 |
| 2006 | World Junior Championships | Beijing, China | 6th | 3,000 m st | 8:34.14 |
| 2007 | World Cross Country Championships | Mombasa, Kenya | 5th | Junior race (8 km) | 24:31 |
| 2007 | All-Africa Games | Algiers, Algeria | 7th | 3,000 m st | 8:34.83 |
| 2007 | World Championships | Osaka, Japan | 28th (h) | 3,000 m st | 8:40.65 |
| 2008 | World Cross Country Championships | Edinburgh, United Kingdom | 4th | Junior race (7.905 km) | 22:43 |
| 2008 | World Junior Championships | Bydgoszcz, Poland | 2nd | 3,000 m st | 8:19.24 |
| 2008 | Olympic Games | Beijing, China | 9th | 3,000 m st | 8:20.27 |
| 2009 | World Championships | Berlin, Germany | 11th | 3,000 m st | 8:17.82 |
| 2010 | African Championships | Nairobi, Kenya | 5th | 3,000 m st | 8:32.03 |
| 2010 | Commonwealth Games | Delhi, India | 4th | 3,000 m st | 8:24.15 |
| 2011 | World Championships | Daegu, South Korea | 10th | 3,000 m st | 8:22.21 |
| 2012 | African Championships | Porto-Novo, Benin | 3rd | 3,000 m st | 8:18.73 |
| 2012 | Olympic Games | London, United Kingdom | 6th (h) | 3,000 m st | 8:18.44 (Note: Disqualified in the final) |
| 2013 | World Championships | Moscow, Russia | 14th | 3,000 m st | 8:31.09 |
| 2015 | World Championships | Beijing, China | 31st (h) | 3,000 m st | 8:54.46 |
| 2016 | Olympic Games | Rio de Janeiro, Brazil | 19th (h) | 3000 m st | 8:30.76 |
| 2019 | World Championships | Doha, Qatar | 18th (h) | 3000 m st | 8:24.44 |

== Personal bests ==
- 1500 m – 3:38.86 (Nijmegen 2009)
- 3000 m – 7:46.50 (Dakar 2010)
- 5000 m – 13:22.67 (Kassel 2007)
- 10,000 m – 29:03.1 (Bugembe 2006)
- 2000 m st – 5:41.1 (Nairobi 2005)
- 3000 m st – 8:03.81 (Lausanne 2010)
