= Richard Mateelong =

Kenyan long-distance runner

Medal record

Men's athletics

Representing Kenya

Olympic Games
Bronze medal – third place	2008 Beijing	3000 m st.

World Championships
Silver medal – second place	2009 Berlin	3000 m st.
Bronze medal – third place	2007 Osaka	3000 m st.

African Championships
Gold medal – first place	2008 Addis Ababa	3000 m st.
Gold medal – first place	2010 Nairobi	3000 m st.
Silver medal – second place	2004 Brazzaville	3000 m st.

Commonwealth Games
Gold medal – first place	2010 Delhi	3000 m st.

Continental Cup
Gold medal – first place	2010 Split	3000 m st.

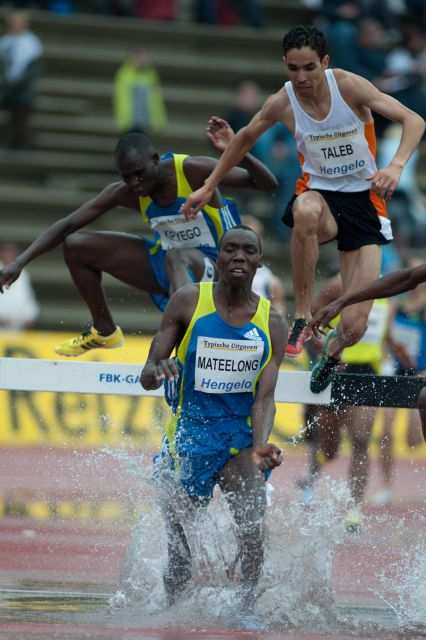
Richard Mateelong & Brahim Taleb during 2010 FBK games in Hengelo

Richard Kipkemboi Mateelong (born 14 October 1983) is a Kenyan professional long-distance runner who specializes in the 3000 metre steeplechase. He won an Olympic bronze medal at the 2008 Beijing Olympics and he has two World Championship medals in the discipline.

== Career ==
He was born in Lenape village, near Narok town in 1983. He started running in 1998, while at high school. He graduated from Moi Amalo Secondary School in 2001 and then joined Kenya Police. In 2004 he finished fifth at the Kenyan Olympic trials, missing the Olympics but was selected for the African Championships, where he won a silver medal.

Mainly competing on the European track and field circuit, he qualified for the IAAF World Athletics Final in 2004, 2005 and 2006, eventually winning a silver medal in the latter edition. His times continued to improve and his new personal best of 8:07.50 set in Rome made him the third fastest man that year. The 2007 season marked a breakthrough for Mateelong as he reached the podium at his first World Championships by taking the bronze medal in the men's steeplechase race. He closed the year with a second consecutive silver at the World Athletics Final.

He made a strong start to the 2008 season, becoming African steeplechase champion at the 2008 African Championships in Athletics. He went on to win his first ever Olympic medal at the 2008 Beijing Olympics later that year, finishing behind compatriot Brimin Kipruto and Mahiedine Mekhissi-Benabbad in the Olympic final. He again managed to get in the medals at the 2008 IAAF World Athletics Final and won bronze on that occasion.

The 2009 World Championships in Athletics brought a new steeplechase best of 8:00.89 for Mateelong, and although he did not beat Ezekiel Kemboi it was enough to win his first silver medal at the global championship level. He competed at the 2009 IAAF World Athletics Final (the final edition of the competition) but failed to maintain his form and finished eighth.

He ran in the Giro Media Blenio 10K in 2010 and finished in third place behind Moses Mosop and Imane Merga.

At the Doha 2012 Diamond League meeting, Mateelong was second to compatriot Paul Koech in the steeplechase, in a new personal best time of 7:56.81. This makes Mateelong the eighth fastest man in history. He came fourth behind Abel Mutai at the Kenyan Olympic trials, however, meaning he did not gain selection for the Kenyan team.

As of 2008, he lives in Nyeri and is married with one child. He is managed by Gianni Demadonna. He is technically advised by Renato Canova.

== Achievements ==
Year	Competition	Venue	Position	Event	Notes
Representing Kenya
2004	African Championships	Brazzaville, Republic of the Congo	2nd	3000 m s'chase	8:26.34
2004	World Athletics Final	Monte Carlo, Monaco	5th	3000 m s'chase	
2005	World Athletics Final	Monte Carlo, Monaco	10th	3000 m s'chase	
2006	World Athletics Final	Stuttgart, Germany	2nd	3000 m s'chase	8:08.62
2007	World Championships	Osaka, Japan	3rd	3000 m s'chase	8:17.59
2007	World Athletics Final	Stuttgart, Germany	2nd	3000 m s'chase	8:07.66
2008	African Championships	Addis Ababa, Ethiopia	1st	3000 m s'chase	8:31.68
2008	Olympic Games	Beijing, China	3rd	3000 m s'chase	8:11.01
2008	World Athletics Final	Stuttgart, Germany	3rd	3000 m s'chase	
2009	World Championships	Berlin, Germany	2nd	3000 m s'chase	8:00.89
2009	World Athletics Final	Thessaloniki, Greece	8th	3000 m s'chase	8:18.83
2010	World Cross Country Championships	Bydgoszcz, Poland	7th	Senior race	Individual
2010	World Cross Country Championships	Bydgoszcz, Poland	1st	Senior race	Team
2010	African Championships	Nairobi, Kenya	1st	3000 m s'chase	8:23.54
2010	Continental Cup	Split, Croatia	1st	3000 m s'chase	
2010	Commonwealth Games	New Delhi, India	1st	3000 m s'chase	8:16.39
2011	World Championships	Daegu, South Korea	7th	3000 m s'chase	8:19.31

=== Personal bests ===
- 1500 metres - 3:41.79 min (2005)
- 3000 metres - 7:48.71 min (2005)
- 5000 metres - 13:30.4 min (2006)
- 3000 metre steeplechase - 7:56.81 min (2012)
