= Birhan Getahun =

Ethiopian runner

Birhan Getahun (born 5 September 1991 in Afar) is an Ethiopian runner. He competed in the 3000 m steeplechase event at the 2012 Summer Olympics. He was the steeplechase champion at the 2011 All-Africa Games.
