= Ruben Ramolefi =

South African steeplechase runner

Medal record

Men's athletics

Representing South Africa

African Championships
| Bronze medal – third place | 2006 Bambous | 3000 m st. |

Ruben Ramolefi (born 17 July 1978) is a South African runner who specializes in the 3000 metres steeplechase and is currently the South African record holder in 3000 metres steeplechase. He also won the National Championship in 3000 metres steeplechase all the years in 2004–2012.

== Competition record ==
| Year | Competition | Venue | Position | Event | Notes |
Representing South Africa
| 2003 | Universiade | Daegu, South Korea | 9th | 5000 m | 14:08.49 |
| 2004 | African Championships | Brazzaville, Republic of the Congo | 5th | 3000 m st. | 8:50.95 |
| 2004 | Olympic Games | Athens, Greece | 34th (h) | 3000 m st. | 8:46.17 |
| 2005 | World Cross Country Championships | Saint-Galmier, France | 38th | Short race | |
| 2005 | World Championships | Helsinki, Finland | 22nd (h) | 3000 m st. | 8:28.12 |
| 2005 | Universiade | İzmir, Turkey | 3rd | 3000 m st. | 8:31.53 |
| 2006 | Commonwealth Games | Melbourne, Australia | 7th | 3000 m st. | 8:35.91 |
| 2006 | African Championships | Bambous, Mauritius | 3rd | 3000 m st. | 8:39.67 |
| 2007 | All-Africa Games | Algiers, Algeria | 8th | 3000 m st. | 8:45.15 |
| 2007 | World Championships | Osaka, Japan | 27th (h) | 3000 m st. | 8:39.50 |
| 2008 | African Championships | Addis Ababa, Ethiopia | 7th | 3000 m st. | 9:09.63 |
| 2008 | Olympic Games | Beijing, China | 14th | 3000 m st. | 8:34.58 |
| 2009 | World Championships | Berlin, Germany | 13th | 3000 m st. | 8:32.54 |
| 2011 | World Championships | Daegu, South Korea | 13th | 3000 m st. | 8:30.47 |
| 2012 | African Championships | Porto-Novo, Benin | 7th | 3000 m st. | 8:29.53 |

=== Personal bests ===
- 800 metres – 1:47.60 min (2010) Potchefstroom
- 1500 metres – 3:41.84 min (2005) Oudtshoorn
- One mile – 3.59.69 min (2011) Belville
- 2000 metres – 5:08.05 min(2006) Melbourne
- 3000 metres – 8:02.35 min (2006) Dakar
- 5000 metres – 13:53. min (2003) Durban
- 3000 metres steeplechase – 8:11.50 min (2011) Daegu
