= Abel Mutai =

Kenyan long-distance runner

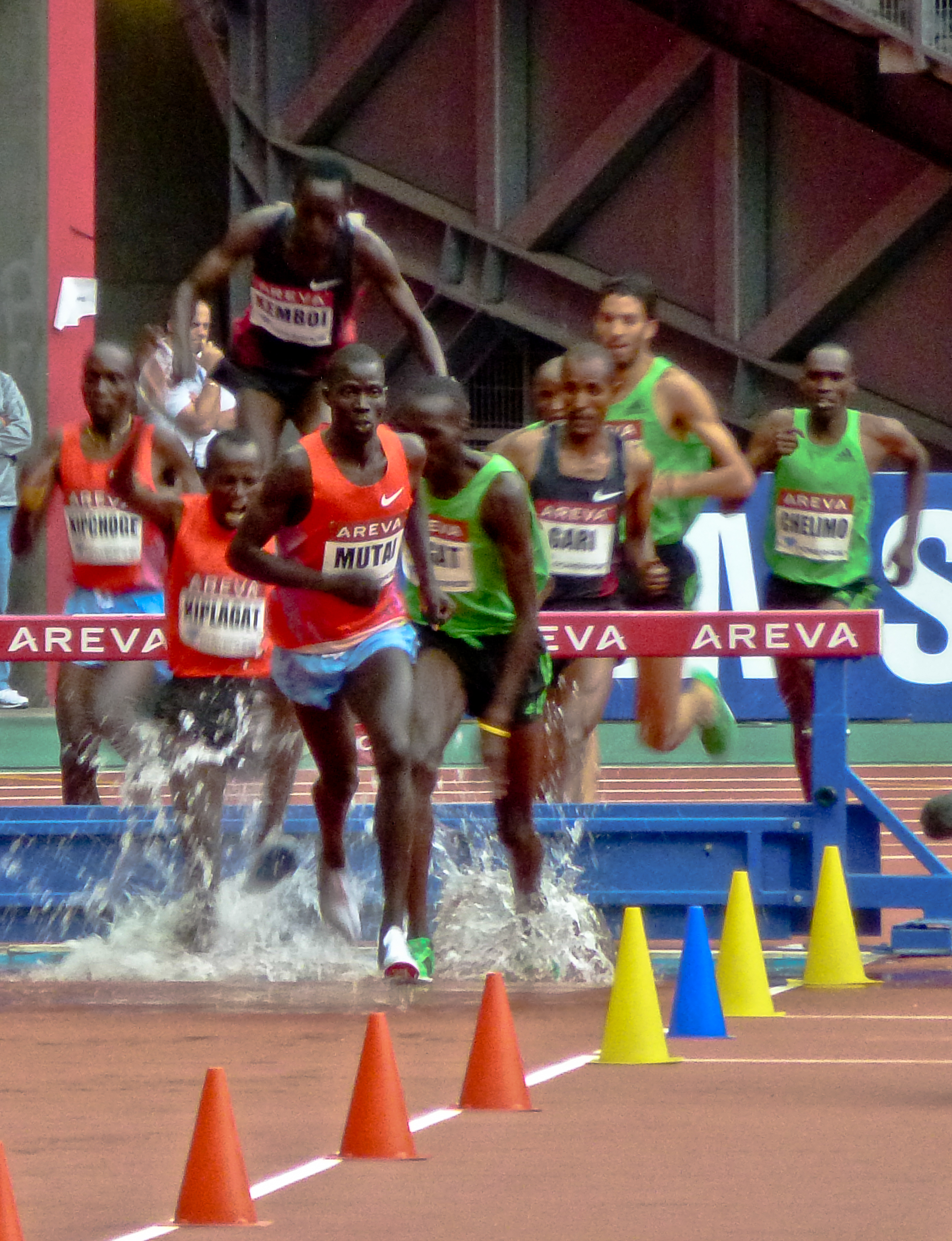
- Mutai in the lead, in 2011

Personal information
- Born: 2 October 1988 (age 38)
- Height: 1.87 m (6 ft 1 1/2 in)
- Weight: 73 kg (161 lb)

Sport
- Country: Kenya
- Sport: Athletics
- Event: 3000m Steeplechase
Medal record
Men's athletics
Representing Kenya
Olympic Games
Bronze medal – third place	2012 London	3000 m st.
African Championships
Gold medal – first place	2012 Porto-Novo	3000 m st.
- Updated on 9 August 2012

Abel Kiprop Mutai (born 2 October 1988) is a Kenyan long-distance runner who specializes in the 3000 metres steeplechase.

== Life and career ==
He was born in Nandi. He won the gold medal at the 2005 World Youth Championships, a bronze medal at the 2012 Summer Olympics, placed seventh at the 2013 World Championship and finished ninth at the 2009 World Athletics Final.

In addition to these, he won the 2000 m steeplechase at the 2007 African Junior Championship. He suffered an Achilles tendon injury which kept him out of competition for all of 2010.

His personal best times are 8:05.16 minutes in the 3000 metres, achieved in June 2006 in Lisbon; and 8:01.67 minutes in the 3000 metres steeplechase, achieved in May 2012 in Rome.

In January 2013, a video went viral showing Mutai stopping short of the finish line during the Burlada Cross Country race after misunderstanding the signage. Fellow long-distance runner Iván Fernández caught up to Mutai and guided him towards the actual finish line instead of passing him to win. Fernández was globally praised for his sportsmanship.

== Competition record ==
Year	Competition	Venue	Position	Event	Notes
Representing Kenya
2005	World Youth Championships	Marrakesh, Morocco	1st	2000 m s'chase	5:24.69
2011	All-Africa Games	Maputo, Mozambique	8th	3000 m s'chase	8:36.75
2012	African Championships	Porto-Novo, Benin	1st	3000 m s'chase	8:16.05
2012	Olympic Games	London, United Kingdom	3rd	3000 m s'chase	8:19.73
