= Nelson Cherutich =

Bahraini steeplechase runner

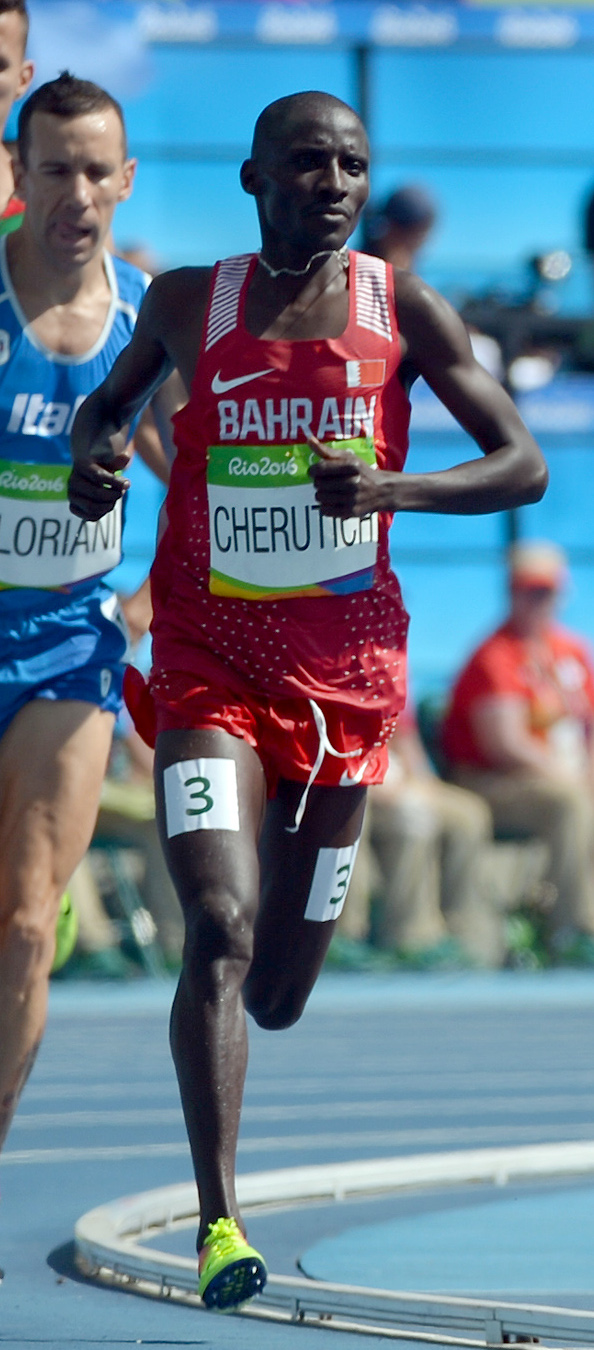
- Cherutich at the 2016 Olympics

Personal information
- Born: 9 March 1993 (age 33)
- Height: 170 cm (5 ft 7 in)
- Weight: 60 kg (132 lb)

Sport
- Sport: Athletics
- Event: Steeplechase

Achievements and titles
- Personal bests: 3000 mS – 8:27.99 (2016); 3000 – 7:48.27 (2016)

Nelson Kipkosgei Cherutich (born 9 March 1993) is a steeplechase runner from Bahrain. He competed at the 2016 Summer Olympics, but failed to reach the final.
