= Albert Yator =

Kenyan long-distance runner (1993–2011)

Medal record

Men's athletics

Representing Kenya

World Junior Championships
Silver medal – second place	2010 Moncton	3000 m steeplechase

Albert Kiptoo Yator (6 September 1993 – 5 February 2011) was a Kenyan professional long-distance runner who specialised in the steeplechase.

Born in Iten, he was the brother of a former world junior record holder, Raymond Yator. He won his first and only international medal at the 2010 World Junior Championships in Athletics in Moncton, Canada, taking the silver medal in the 3000 metres steeplechase as part of a Kenyan 1–2 with Jonathan Muia Ndiku. Having gained representation with PACE Sports Management, he made his debut on the major European track and field circuit later that year. At the Memorial van Damme Diamond League meeting in Brussels he came fifth in a personal best of 8:23.69 minutes – the fastest time by a youth level athlete that year, and also the fourth fastest junior time.

Yator began his 2011 cross country season on the Athletics Kenya National Cross Series, coming sixth in the junior section. However, his running was interrupted by illness and he was admitted to Eldoret Hospital with suspected malaria. His health rapidly worsened and the young athlete died on 5 February at the age of seventeen due to what was later identified as bronchopneumonia. Noah Ngeny, the 2000 Olympic champion over 1500 metres, paid tribute to Yator, describing him as a "talented runner".
