= Nahom Mesfin Tariku =

Ethiopian runner (born 1989)

Nahom Mesfin
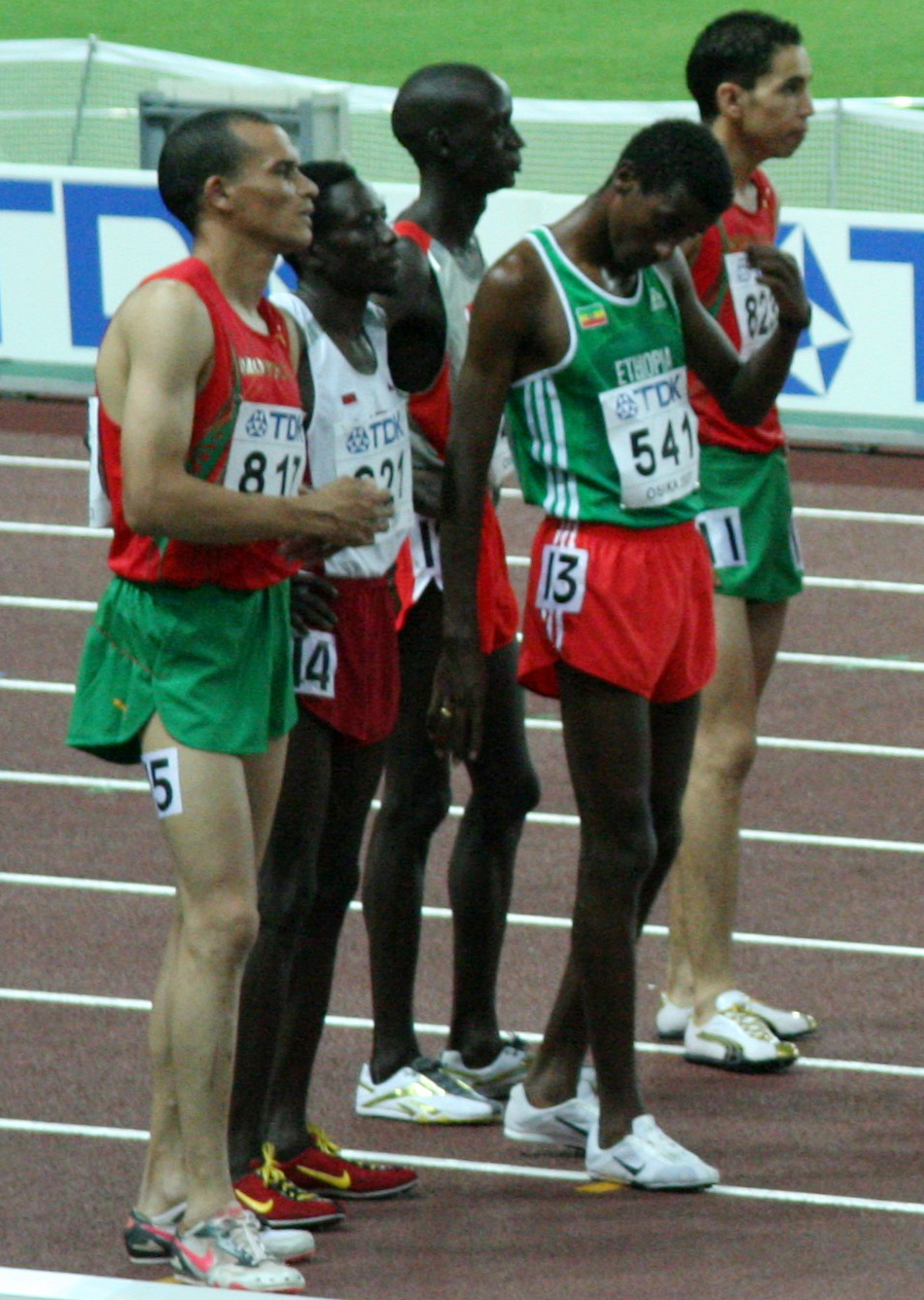
- Mesfin (in green vest) at the 2007 World Championships

Personal information
- Nationality: Ethiopian
- Born: June 3, 1989 (age 37) Dilla, Ethiopia

Sport
- Sport: Track, long-distance running
- Event: 3000 metres steeplechase

Achievements and titles
- Personal best(s): 1500 meters: 3:41.60; 3000-m steeple: 8:12.04; 5000 meters: 13:29.74; 10,000 meters: 28:07.80
Medal record
Athletics
Representing Ethiopia
All-Africa Games
Bronze medal – third place	2007 Algiers	3000m steeple

Nahom Mesfin Tariku (Amharic: ናሆም መስፍን ታሪኩ; born 6 March 1989) is an Ethiopian runner who specialized in the 3000 metres steeplechase. He competed at the Summer Olympics in 2008 and 2012. He was born in Dilla.

== Running career ==
He reached the steeplechase final at the 2007 World Championships in Athletics. Nahom represented Ethiopia at the 2008 Summer Olympics, running the steeplechase. He represented Ethiopia again in the same event at the 2012 Summer Olympics.

In 2013 he moved to the United States, where he transitioned into a road racer. He first trained in Flagstaff, Arizona in order to run at high altitude. He subsequently moved to Alexandria, Virginia, and went on to win a series of races in the Washington, D.C. metropolitan area. At a very competitive 2014 Cherry Blossom 10 Mile Run, Mesfin finished in 12th place with a time of 47:30.

== Competition record ==
Year	Competition	Venue	Position	Event	Notes
Representing Ethiopia
2005	World Youth Championships	Marrakesh, Morocco	4th	2000 m s'chase	5:29.51
2006	World Junior Championships	Beijing, China	4th	3000 m s'chase	8:28.29
2007	All-Africa Games	Algiers, Algeria	3rd	3000 m s'chase	8:17.21
2007	World Championships	Osaka, Japan	12th	3000 m s'chase	8:28.86
2008	African Championships	Addis Ababa, Ethiopia	4th	3000 m s'chase	8:50.21
2008	Summer Olympics	Beijing, China	19th (h)	3000 m s'chase	8:23.82
2010	African Championships	Nairobi, Kenya	4th	3000 m s'chase	8:30.25
2011	World Championships	Daegu, South Korea	11th	3000 m s'chase	8:25.39
2012	African Championships	Porto-Novo, Benin	4th	3000 m s'chase	8:20.23

=== Personal bests ===
- 3000 metres indoor – 7:46.39 min (2008)
- 3000 metres steeplechase – 8:12.04 min (2011)
- 1500 metres indoor – 3:43.31 (2008)
- 5000 metres – 13:29.74 (2009)
- 2000 metres steeplechase – 5:29.51 (2005)
