= Eric Appiah =

Ghanaian footballer

Personal information
- Full name: Eric Appiah Ansu
- Date of birth: 8 May 2001 (age 25)
- Place of birth: Ghana
- Height: 5 ft 9 in (1.74 m)
- Position: Forward

Team information
- Current team: MEAP Nisou
- Number: 27

Youth career
- Club Brugge

Senior career*
Years	Team	Apps	(Gls)
2020–2021	Club NXT	15	(0)
2021–2022	Metalac Gornji Milanovac	2	(0)
2022-23	Olympias Lympion	25	(8)
2022–2025	Doxa Katokopias	12	(2)
2023–2024	→ Olympiakos Nicosia (loan)	29	(9)
2025	AEZ Zakakiou	15	(1)
2025-	MEAP Nisou	27	(5)

International career^{‡}
2021	Ghana U20	1	(0)
- * Club domestic league appearances and goals as of 3 May 2026 ‡ National team caps and goals as of 1 August 2023

Eric Appiah Ansu (born 8 May 2001) is a Ghanaian professional footballer who played as a forward for Cypriot side AEZ Zakakiou.

== Club career ==
Appiah made his professional debut for Club Brugge's reserve side, Club NXT in the Belgian First Division B against RWDM47. He started as NXT lost 0–2.

== International career ==
He represented Ghana national under-20 football team.

== Honours ==
Ghana U20

- U-20 Africa Cup of Nations: 2021

== Career statistics ==
=== Club ===
As of match played 16 October 2020

Appearances and goals by club, season and competition
Club	Season	League			Cup		Other		Total	
Club	Season	Division	Apps	Goals	Apps	Goals	Apps	Goals	Apps	Goals
Club NXT	2020–21	Belgian First Division B	15	0	—	—	—	—	15	0
Career total			15	0	0	0	0	0	15	0
