= Boštjan Buč =

Slovenian track athlete (born 1980)

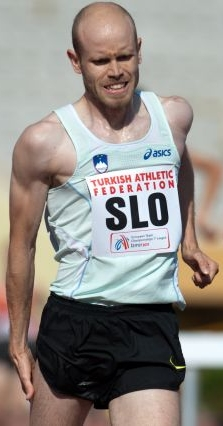
- Buč at the 2011 European Team Championships

Personal information
- Nationality: Slovenian
- Born: 13 April 1980 (age 46) Celje, Slovenia

Sport
- Sport: Track
- Events: 1500 metres, 3000 metres, 3000 metres steeplechase, 5000 metres

Achievements and titles
- Personal bests: 1500 metres: 3:43.52; 3000-m steeplechase: 8:16.96; 5000 metres: 13:40.61

Boštjan Buč (born 13 April 1980) is a Slovenian retired track athlete who competed in various middle- and long-distance events. He represented Slovenia at the Summer Olympics in 2004 and 2008. He is the Slovenian record holder for the men's 3,000 metres steeplechase.

== Running career ==
Buč entered the international athletics stage as a long-distance runner, and he finished in 85th place of 149 finishers in the junior men's race at the 1999 IAAF World Cross Country Championships. Later on he would use his aerobic base from cross-country running to specialize in the steeplechase. He ran the 3000-metre steeplechase at the 2003 World Championships in Athletics in preparation for next year's Olympics. In the 3000-metre steeplechase at the 2004 Summer Olympics, he finished in 8:37.29, although he did not make it to the final round. He narrowly missed the final round at the 3000-metres steeplechase at the 2008 Summer Olympics, losing the last final round berth to Ion Luchianov.

== Achievements ==
Year	Competition	Venue	Position	Event	Notes
Representing Slovenia
2001	European U23 Championships	Amsterdam, Netherlands	7th	3000m steeplechase	8:41.82
2006	European Championships	Gothenburg, Sweden	25th	3000 m steeple	9:13.90
2010	European Championships	Barcelona, Spain	12th	3000 m steeple	8:48.83
