= Roba Gari =

Ethiopian steeplechase runner

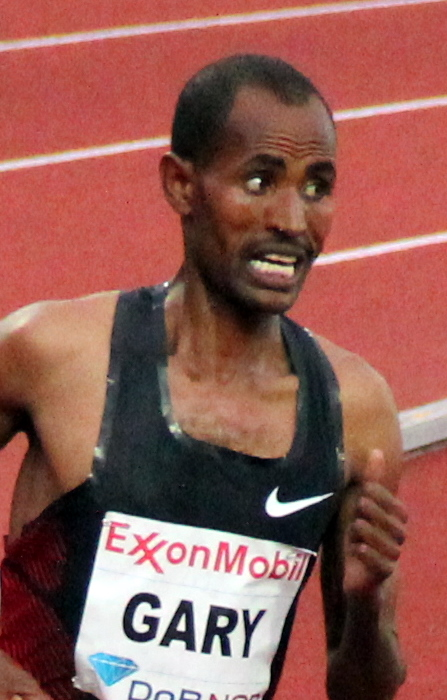
- Roba Gary at the 2011 Bislett Games.

Medal record

Men's athletics

Representing Ethiopia

Continental Cup
Silver medal – second place	2010 Split	3000 m steeplechase

All-Africa Games
Silver medal – second place	2011 Maputo	3000 m steeplechase

African Championships
Bronze medal – third place	2010 Nairobi	3000 m steeplechase

Roba Gari (Amharic: ሮባ ጋር; born 12 April 1982) is an Ethiopian runner, who specializes in the 3000 metres steeplechase.

He finished tenth at the 2007 World Championships, in his major international debut.

His personal best time is 8:06.16 minutes, achieved at the IAAF Diamond League in May 2012 in Doha.

== Competition record ==
Year	Competition	Venue	Position	Event	Notes
Representing Ethiopia
2007	All-Africa Games	Algiers, Algeria	5th	3000 m s'chase	8:28.43
2007	World Championships	Osaka, Japan	10th	3000 m s'chase	8:25.93
2008	Olympic Games	Beijing, China	23rd (h)	3000 m s'chase	8:28.27
2009	World Championships	Berlin, Germany	6th	3000 m s'chase	8:12.40
2010	African Championships	Nairobi, Kenya	3rd	3000 m s'chase	8:27.15
2011	World Championships	Daegu, South Korea	5th	3000 m s'chase	8:18.37
2011	All-Africa Games	Maputo, Mozambique	2nd	3000 m s'chase	8:18.42
2012	Olympic Games	London, United Kingdom	4th	3000 m s'chase	8:20.00
2013	World Championships	Moscow, Russia	35th (h)	3000 m s'chase	8:45.06
