= Raymond Yator =

Kenyan steeplechase runner (born 1981)

Raymond Kipkorir Yator (born 7 April 1981) is a Kenyan former steeplechase athlete. He was a former world junior record holder and world junior champion for the steeplechase. His personal best of 8:03.74 minutes ranks him with the all-time top 25 for the event. He was a finalist at the 2001 World Championships in Athletics.

== Career ==
Yator grew up in Kendur, a small village in Elgeyo-Marakwet County, and attended St Peters Marakwet Boys High School. He began to train with high level runners Reuben Kosgei, Bernard Barmasai and Patrick Sang. After running a time of 8:15.31 minutes at the Weltklasse Zürich in 1999 at the age of eighteen he took a gold medal at the 1999 African Junior Athletics Championships in a championships record.

He proved himself to be among the world elite at the 2000 Herculis meet, setting a time of 8:03.74 minutes. This was a world junior record, ranked him as the fourth fastest in the world that year and moved into the world's all-time top ten for the distance at the point. Although he was disappointed not to make the Olympic team that year, the teenager took the gold medal at the 2000 World Junior Championships in Athletics in a championship record of 8:16.34 minutes. He was sombre in victory in spite of having a fifteen-second winning margin.

Good performances followed in his first senior season, with his best being 8:09.20 minutes at the Golden Gala meeting. However, he was unable to match this form at neither the 2001 IAAF Grand Prix Final, 2001 World Championships in Athletics, where he was eighth in 8:20.87, nor the 2001 Goodwill Games, where he was seventh in 8:27.19 minutes.

His performances declined in 2003, with his best being 8:30.69 minutes and he did not compete in 2003. He returned to action in 2004 with an improved 8:15.20 minutes, which brought him back within the world top twenty for the season. However, his career was disrupted that year by the onset of alcoholism. His dedication to training waned and he remained in his village, spending his racing winnings on alcohol with locals. Ten years later he expressed an interest to return to running, with a focus on the half marathon, though he lacked the facilities and support network to restart his career.

His younger brother Albert Yator followed in his footsteps and won a world junior steeplechase medal in 2010, but died of malaria in 2011 before getting the chance to explore a senior career.

== International competitions ==
Year	Competition	Venue	Position	Event	Notes
1999	African Junior Athletics Championships	Tunis, Tunisia	1st	3000 m s'chase	8:19.84 CR
2000	World Junior Championships	Santiago, Chile	1st	3000 m s'chase	8:16.34 CR
2001	World Championships	Edmonton, Canada	8th	3000 m s'chase	8:20.87
2001	IAAF Grand Prix Final	Melbourne, Australia	8th	3000 m s'chase	8:31.21
2001	Goodwill Games	Brisbane, Australia	7th	3000 m s'chase	8:27.19
