= Ezekiel Kemboi =

Kenyan steeplechase runner (born 1982)

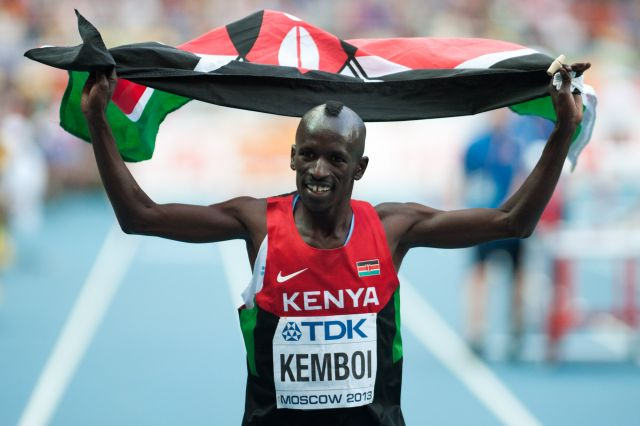
- Kemboi at the 2013 World Championships in Athletics

Personal information
- Full name: Ezekiel Kemboi Yano
- Nationality: Kenyan
- Born: 25 May 1982 (age 44) Matira, Rift Valley Province, Kenya
- Height: 1.67 m (5 ft 5 1/2 in)
- Weight: 52 kg (115 lb)

Sport
- Sport: Track & field
- Event: 3000 metres steeplechase
Medal record
Men's athletics
Representing Kenya
Olympic Games
Gold medal – first place	2004 Athens	3000 m st.
Gold medal – first place	2012 London	3000 m st.
World Championships
Gold medal – first place	2009 Berlin	3000 m st.
Gold medal – first place	2011 Daegu	3000 m st.
Gold medal – first place	2013 Moscow	3000 m st.
Gold medal – first place	2015 Beijing	3000 m st.
Silver medal – second place	2003 Paris	3000 m st.
Silver medal – second place	2005 Helsinki	3000 m st.
Silver medal – second place	2007 Osaka	3000 m st.
African Championships
Silver medal – second place	2010 Nairobi	3000 m st.
Bronze medal – third place	2014 Marrakesh	3000 m st.
Commonwealth Games
Gold medal – first place	2006 Melbourne	3000 m st.
Silver medal – second place	2002 Manchester	3000 m st.
Silver medal – second place	2010 Delhi	3000 m st.
Bronze medal – third place	2014 Glasgow	3000 m st.
- Updated on 24 August 2015

Ezekiel Kemboi Cheboi (born 25 May 1982) is a Kenyan professional athlete, winner of the 3000 metres steeplechase at the 2004 Summer Olympics, the 2009 World Championships, the 2011 World Championships, the 2012 Summer Olympics, the 2013 World Championships and the 2015 World Championships. His 3000 m steeplechase best of 7:55.76 set at Monaco in 2011 places him as the seventh fastest of all time. This time is also the fastest non-winning time in history. He is one of only five men to have won both Olympic and World golds in the event, along with Reuben Kosgei, Brimin Kipruto, Conseslus Kipruto and Soufiane El Bakkali. He and El Bakkali are the only multiple gold medalists in both. He is the only athlete to have won four world championships in the steeplechase (which he won consecutively). He is one of only three athletes to have won two Olympic titles in the event; the other two being Volmari Iso-Hollo and Soufiane El Bakkali.

== Biography ==
Born in Matira, Kemboi graduated from Kapsowar Boys Secondary School in 1999. He did not take up athletics until after he left school, but was spotted by Paul Ereng and won the African Junior Championships in 2001 despite falling.

Kemboi became African Junior Champion in 2001 and then in 2002, he finished second at the Commonwealth Games behind compatriot Stephen Cherono. The same year Kemboi was originally fourth at the African Championships in Athletics, but was later awarded bronze after the winner Moroccan Brahim Boulami received a doping suspension.

At the 2003 World Championships, Kemboi had a gruelling battle with former teammate Saif Saeed Shaheen (formerly Stephen Cherono) who represented his new country Qatar, before Shaheen pulled away from the exhausted Kemboi to win by less than a second. Kemboi won the gold medal at the 2003 All-Africa Games.

In the absence of Shaheen – the Kenyan Olympic Committee refused to waive the three-year eligibility delay for established athletes who switch nationalities – Kemboi rose to a main favourite status at the Athens Olympics. The race went very much according to form, with the three Kenyans Kemboi, Brimin Kipruto and Paul Kipsiele Koech pushing the pace from the second lap and soon leaving the rest of the field behind and Kemboi winning a gold medal 0.3 seconds ahead of Kipruto in a Kenyan sweep.

In August 2005 he won a silver medal at the 2005 World Championships in Athletics again behind Shaheen, and in March 2006 he won the 2006 Commonwealth Games. He finished second at the 2006 African Championships in Athletics, but was disqualified for improper hurdling. At the 2007 World Championships in Athletics he won his third successive silver medal, this time losing to Kipruto.

Kemboi represented Kenya at the 2008 Beijing Olympics but managed only seventh – his worst performance on the global stage. He rebounded with a win at the 2009 World Championships (his first world championship gold medal) after three successive silvers and took silver at the 2010 African Championships the following year behind 2008 bronze medalist Richard Mateelong.

He took to the road races of Italy in August 2010, beating Peter Kimeli to the tape to win the Corribianco race in Bianco, then taking the honours at the 8.5-kilometre Amatrice-Configno.

He won the gold medal at the 2011 World Championships in Athletics in Daegu, South Korea.

Kemboi won the gold medal for Kenya in the 3000m Steeplechase in London 2012. Kemboi won in a time of eight minutes 18.56 seconds.

In 2013, Kemboi added his third straight gold medal at the World Championships. In 2015, he took his fourth successive title at the 2015 World Championships in Athletics. This was his seventh World medal, setting a record for any athlete, which would subsequently be surpassed by Chinese shot putter Gong Lijao in 2023.

On 17 August 2016, he won a bronze medal for Kenya in the 3000m Steeplechase in the Rio Olympics 2016. He then announced his retirement after the win. Kemboi was later that day disqualified for stepping outside of the track. An investigation into the incident was instigated when the French Olympic team complained that the runner had stepped out of the track after his final water jump during the race. The bronze medal was subsequently awarded to French runner Mahiedine Mekhissi-Benabbad. He announced his retirement immediately following the Olympic race, but rescinded that decision after learning of his disqualification. He made one final attempt, making the finals at the 2017 World Championships, where he finished a disappointing 11th place.

== Personal life ==
Kemboi is managed by Enrico Dionisi. Since 2002 he has owned a 50-acre (20 ha) farm near Moi's Bridge, Trans-Nzoia District. He is married to Jane Kemboi with two sons. Since 2009 he has been coached by Moses Kiptanui, who is also his neighbour.

His participation in the 2012 Olympics was initially put in doubt when he was charged with assault in June 2012, after a woman claimed he stabbed her after she refused his sexual advances.

== Achievements ==
Year	Competition	Venue	Position	Notes
2001	African Junior Championships	Moka-Réduit, Mauritius	1st	3000 m s'chase
2002	Commonwealth Games	Manchester, United Kingdom	2nd	3000 m s'chase
2002	African Championships	Radès, Tunisia	4th	3000 m s'chase
2003	All-Africa Games	Abuja, Nigeria	1st	3000 m s'chase
2003	World Championships	Paris, France	2nd	3000 m s'chase
2003	World Athletics Final	Monte Carlo, Monaco	3rd	3000 m s'chase
2004	Olympic Games	Athens, Greece	1st	3000 m s'chase
2004	World Athletics Final	Monte Carlo, Monaco	2nd	3000 m s'chase
2005	World Championships	Helsinki, Finland	2nd	3000 m s'chase
2005	World Athletics Final	Monte Carlo, Monaco	2nd	3000 m s'chase
2006	Commonwealth Games	Melbourne, Australia	1st	3000 m s'chase
2006	World Athletics Final	Stuttgart, Germany	5th	3000 m s'chase
2007	All-Africa Games	Algiers, Algeria	2nd	3000 m steeple
2007	World Championships	Osaka, Japan	2nd	3000 m s'chase
2008	Olympic Games	Beijing, China	7th	3000 m s'chase
2008	World Athletics Final	Stuttgart, Germany	2nd	3000 m s'chase
2009	World Championships	Berlin, Germany	1st	3000 m s'chase
2009	World Athletics Final	Thessaloniki, Greece	1st	3000 m s'chase
2010	African Championships	Nairobi, Kenya	2nd	3000 m s'chase
2011	World Championships	Daegu, South Korea	1st	3000 m s'chase
2012	Olympic Games	London, United Kingdom	1st	3000 m s'chase
2013	World Championships	Moscow, Russia	1st	3000 m s'chase
2014	Commonwealth Games	Glasgow, United Kingdom	3rd	3000 m s'chase
2015	World Championships	Beijing, China	1st	3000 m s'chase
2016	Olympic Games	Rio de Janeiro, Brazil	DQ	3000 m s'chase
2017	World Championships	London, United Kingdom	11th	3000 m s'chase
