= David Chemweno =

Kenyan long-distance runner

Medal record

Men's athletics

Representing Kenya

African Championships
Gold medal – first place	2004 Brazzaville	3000 m st.

David Chemweno (born 18 December 1981) is a Kenyan long-distance runner who specializes in the 3000 metres steeplechase. He was the gold medallist in that event at the 2004 African Championships in Athletics.

== International competitions ==
Year	Competition	Venue	Position	Event	Notes
Representing Kenya
2000	World Junior Championships	Santiago, Chile	2nd	3000m steeplechase	8:31.95
2004	African Championships	Brazzaville, Congo	1st	3000 m st.	8:17.31
2004	World Athletics Final	Monte Carlo, Monaco	7th	3000 m st.	8:17.98

== Personal bests ==
- 3000 metres - 7:41.35 min (2005)
- 3000 metres steeplechase - 8:09.09 min (2005)
