= Ali Al-Amri =

Saudi Arabian long-distance runner

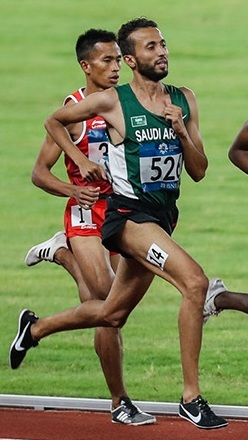
- Ali Al-Amri in 2018

Medal record

Men's athletics

Representing Saudi Arabia

Asian Championships
Gold medal – first place	2007 Amman	3000 m st.

Ali Ahmed Al-Amri (Arabic: على أحمد العمري; born 28 December 1987) is a Saudi Arabian long-distance runner who specializes in the 3000 metres steeplechase.

He was born in Ta’if.

== Career ==
He finished tenth at the 2006 World Junior Championships, and fourth at the 2006 Asian Games. He also competed at the 2007 World Championships, the 2011 World Championships, the 2008 Summer Olympics and the 2012 Summer Olympics without reaching the final.

His personal best time is 8:21.87 minutes, achieved in June 2006 in Algiers. His best times over other distances are: 8:14.86 minutes in the 3000 metres, achieved in August 2004 in Rabat; 13:56.80 minutes in the 5000 metres, achieved in May 2006 in Qatif; and 30:25.03 minutes in the 10,000 metres, achieved in July 2006 in Macau.
