= Paul Kipsiele Koech =

Kenyan steeplechase runner (born 1981)

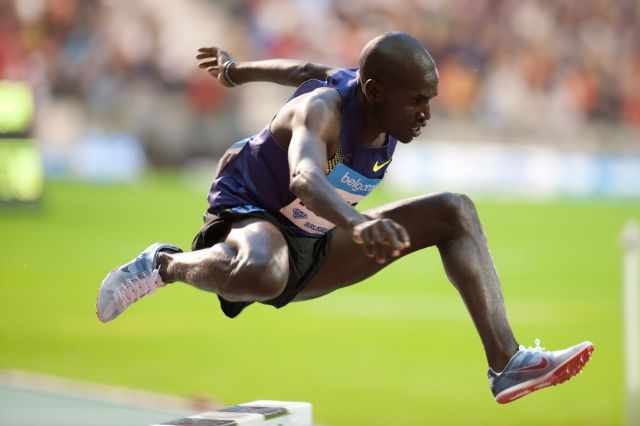
- Kipsiele Koech running on the 2010 Diamond League circuit

Medal record

Men's athletics

Representing Kenya

African Championships
Gold medal – first place	2006 Bambous	3000 m st.

Paul Kipsiele Koech (born 10 November 1981) is a Kenyan runner who specializes in the 3000 metres steeplechase. He won the 2004 Olympic bronze medal in this event. His personal best of 7:54.31 minutes is the third fastest of all time.

He was born in 1981 in Kapchepkoro, near the town of Sotik. He graduated from Cheplanget Secondary School in 1999. He did well at the National Cross Country Championships and was subsequently invited to compete in Europe and joined a team managed by James Templeton.

Despite being among the fastest steeplechasers, he has failed several times at the Kenyan trials for World championships or Olympics. He competed at the all seven IAAF World Athletics Final meetings, finishing every time in the top three, being the only athlete to achieve it.

He has had success in cross country running, with wins at the Cinque Mulini (2006) and the Iris Lotto Cross Cup (2007) to his name. He holds the steeplechase meet record for the Prefontaine Classic, Adidas Grand Prix, and DN Galan.

He has built a primary school near his home. He also trains some younger runners, including World junior champion Mercy Cherono. Koech is married and has a daughter born in 2004 and a younger son.

In February 2010 he set a world best of 5:17.04 in the rarely competed 2000 m indoor steeplechase. He won twice in the 2010 Diamond League and finished with enough points to become the inaugural steeplechase Diamond Trophy winner. He improved his indoor 2000 m steeplechase record to 5:13.77 at the Indoor Flanders Meeting in February 2011.

At the Rome Diamond League event in May Koech set a new personal best of 7:54.31, the third fastest time ever for the 3000 metre steeplechase. Despite this performance, he did not perform well in the altitude of the Kenyan Olympic trials and finished outside of the top five.

== Achievements ==
Year	Competition	Venue	Position	Notes
2003	All-Africa Games	Abuja, Nigeria	2nd	
2003	World Athletics Final	Monte Carlo, Monaco	2nd	
2004	Olympic Games	Athens, Greece	3rd	3000 m steeple
2004	World Athletics Final	Monte Carlo, Monaco	3rd	
2005	World Championships	Helsinki, Finland	7th	3000 m steeple
2005	World Athletics Final	Monte Carlo, Monaco	1st	
2006	African Championships	Bambous, Mauritius	1st	
2006	World Athletics Final	Stuttgart, Germany	1st	
2006	IAAF World Cup	Athens, Greece	2nd	
2007	World Athletics Final	Stuttgart, Germany	1st	
2008	World Indoor Championships	Valencia, Spain	2nd	3000 m
2008	World Athletics Final	Stuttgart, Germany	1st	
2009	World Championships	Berlin, Germany	4th	3000 m steeple
2009	World Athletics Final	Thessaloniki, Greece	2nd	3000 m s'chase
2010	Diamond League	Diamond trophy winner	1st	3000 m s'chase

=== Personal bests ===
- 1500 metres – 3:37.92 (2007)
- 3000 metres – 7:33.93 (2005)
- Two miles – 8:13.31 (2008)
- 5000 metres – 13:05.18 (2010)
- 3000 metres steeplechase – 7:54.31 (2012)
- Half Marathon - 1:01:03 (2017)
- Marathon - 2:12:02 (2017)

Sporting positions
Preceded by (Qatar) Saif Saaeed Shaheen	Men's 3000 m Steeple Best Year Performance; 2007–2008	Succeeded by (Kenya) Ezekiel Kemboi
