= List of half marathon races =

This is a list of notable half marathon races. (Note: Wikipedia:Notability (sports) outlines the criteria for notability of road races. For marathon races that also include a half marathon event, see List of marathon races (disambiguation).) According to Running Times Magazine, There were approximately 870 half marathons in the United States in 2009.

== 0-9 ==
- (United States) 3M Half Marathon (Austin, Texas, US)
- 21K Buenos Aires (Buenos Aires, Argentina)

== A ==
- (United States) Air Force Half Marathon (Dayton, Ohio, US)
- Adana Half Marathon (Adana, Turkey)
- (United States) America's Finest City Half Marathon (San Diego, California, US)
- (United Kingdom) Antrim Coast Half Marathon (Larne, Northern Ireland)
- (United States) Invesco QQQ Half Marathon (Atlanta, Georgia, US)

== B ==
- Bangkok Half Marathon (Bangkok, Thailand)
- Bangsaen21 Half Marathon (Bang Saen, Thailand)
- Barcelona Half Marathon (Barcelona, Spain)
- Barrathon (Barra, Scotland)
- Bath Half Marathon (Bath, England)
- (United Kingdom) Belfast Half Marathon (Belfast, Northern Ireland)
- (China) Beijing E-Town Half-Marathon
- Belgrade Half Marathon (Belgrade, Serbia)
- Berlin Half Marathon (Berlin, Germany)
- Birmingham Half Marathon (Birmingham, England)
- Bogotá Half Marathon, (Bogotá, Colombia)
- Brass Monkey Half Marathon (York, England)
- Brighton Half Marathon (Brighton, England)
- Bristol Half Marathon (Bristol, England)
- Budapest Half Marathon (Budapest, Hungary)
- Buenos Aires Half Marathon (Buenos Aires, Argentina)

== C ==
- Cardiff Half Marathon (Cardiff, Wales)
- České Budějovice Half Marathon (České Budějovice, Czech Republic)
- (England) Chester Half Marathon (Chester)
- (United States) Chicago Half Marathon (Chicago)
- City-Pier-City Loop (the Hague, Netherlands)
- City of Norwich Half Marathon (Norwich, England)
- Copenhagen Half Marathon (Copenhagen, Denmark)
- (United States) Cowtown Half Marathon (Fort Worth, Texas, US)

== D ==
- Delhi Half Marathon (Delhi, India)

== E ==
- Edinburgh Marathon Festival Half Marathon (Edinburgh, Scotland)

== F ==
- Fleet Half Marathon (Fleet, Hampshire, England)
- Four Villages Half Marathon (Helsby, England)
- Freckleton Half Marathon (Freckleton, England)

== G ==
- Gifu Seiryu Half Marathon (Gifu, Japan)
- Gold Coast Half Marathon (Gold Coast, Queensland, Australia)
- Göteborgsvarvet (Gothenburg, Sweden)
- Great Eastern Run (Peterborough, England)
- Great North Run (Newcastle upon Tyne, England)
- Great North West Half Marathon (Blackpool, England)
- Great Scottish Run (Glasgow, Scotland)
- Great West Run (Exeter, England)
- Greifenseelauf (Uster, Switzerland)
- Guadalajara Half Marathon (Guadalajara, Jalisco, Mexico)
- Guwahati Half Marathon (Guwahati, India)

== H ==
- Hastings Half Marathon (Hastings, England)
- Hamburg Half Marathon (Hamburg, Germany)
- Helsinki City Run (Helsinki, Finland)
- Hong Kong Marathon (Hong Kong, Hong Kong)
- (United States) Houston Half Marathon (Houston, Texas, US)

== I ==
- (United States) Invesco QQQ Half Marathon (Atlanta, Georgia (Georgia State Stadium)
- Istanbul Half Marathon (Istanbul, Turkey)

== K ==
- Kagawa Marugame Half Marathon (Marugame, Japan)
- Karlovy Vary Half Marathon (Karlovy Vary, Czech Republic)
- Kuldīga Half Marathon (Kuldīga, Latvia)
- Kärnten läuft (Klagenfurt, Austria)

== L ==
- Lake Vyrnwy Half Marathon (Lake Vyrnwy, Wales)
- Lisbon Half Marathon (Lisbon, Portugal)
- Liverpool Half Marathon (Liverpool, England)

== M ==
- (United States) Madeline Island Half-Marathon (La Pointe, Wisconsin, US)
- Madrid Half Marathon (Madrid, Spain)
- (England) Maidenhead Half Marathon (Maidenhead, Berkshire, United Kingdom)
- Malaga Half Marathon (Málaga, Andalusia, Spain)
- (United States) Marine Corps Historic Half (Fredericksburg, Virginia, US)
- Marseille-Cassis Classique Internationale (Marseille, France)

== N ==
- (United States) Naples Half Marathon (Naples, Florida, US)
- (United States) New York City Half Marathon (New York, US)

== O ==
- Olomouc Half Marathon (Olomouc, Czech Republic)
- (United States) OneAmerica 500 Festival Mini-Marathon (Indianapolis, Indiana)

== P ==
- (England) Paddock Wood Half Marathon (Paddock Wood, Kent, UK)
- Paris Half Marathon (Paris, France)
- Pattaya Half Marathon (Pattaya, Thailand)
- Perth Half Marathon (Perth, Australia)
- (United States) Philadelphia Distance Run (Philadelphia, Pennsylvania, US)
- (United States) Pittsburgh Half Marathon (Pittsburgh, Pennsylvania, US)
- Polar Night Halfmarathon (Tromsø, Norway)
- Porto Half Marathon (Porto, Portugal)
- Prague Half Marathon (Prague, Czech Republic)
- Pune Half Marathon (Pune, India)

== R ==
- RAK Half Marathon (Ras al-Khaimah, United Arab Emirates)
- Reading Half Marathon (Reading, England)
- Riga Half Marathon (Riga, Latvia)
- Robin Hood Marathon (Nottingham, England)
- (United States) Rock 'n' Roll San Jose Half Marathon (San Jose, California, US)
- (United States) Rock 'n' Roll Virginia Beach Half Marathon (Virginia Beach, Virginia, US)
- Rocky River Run (Rockhampton, Queensland, Australia)
- Roma-Ostia (Rome, Italy)
- Rotterdam Half Marathon (Rotterdam, Netherlands)
- Royal Parks Half Marathon (London, England)
- Run to the Beat (London, England)

== S ==
- (United States) San Diego Half Marathon (San Diego, California, US)
- Semi-Marathon de Paris (Paris, France)
- Sheffield Half Marathon (Sheffield, England)
- Silverstone Half Marathon (Northamptonshire, England)
- SMH half marathon (Sydney, NSW, Australia)
- Stramilano (Milan, Italy)
- Stockholm Half Marathon (Stockholm, Sweden)
- Stroud Half Marathon (Stroud, England)
- Stuttgarter Zeitung-Lauf (Stuttgart, Germany)

== T ==
- Tallinn Half Marathon (Tallinn, Estonia)
- Tarsus Half Marathon (Tarsus, Mersin, Turkey)
- Tunbridge Wells Half Marathon (Tunbridge Wells, England)
- Two Oceans Half Marathon (Cape Town, South Africa)
- (Taiwan) Tainan Historical Capital International Half Marathon (Tainan, Taïwan)

== U ==
- Ústí nad Labem Half Marathon (Ústí nad Labem, Czech Republic)

== V ==
- Valencia Half Marathon (Valencia, Spain)

== W ==
- Warsaw Half Marathon (Warsaw, Masovian Voivodeship, Poland)
- (United States) WhistleStop Half Marathon (Ashland, Wisconsin, US)
- Wilmslow Half Marathon (Wilmslow, England)
- Windsor Half Marathon (Windsor, England)
- Wokingham Half Marathon (Wokingham, England)

== Y ==
- Yangzhou Jianzhen International Half Marathon (Yangzhou, China)

== See also ==
- List of marathon races
- World Athletics Road Running Championships
- World Athletics Label Road Races
- World Marathon Majors
