= Brighton Half Marathon =

Running race in Brighton, England

- Date: February
- Location: Brighton
- Event type: Road
- Distance: Half marathon
- Established: 1990; 36 years ago
- Course records: 1:04:30 (men); 1:15:34 (women)
- Website: brightonhalfmarathon.com

The Brighton Half Marathon is an annual half marathon road running race. The race is run primarily along Brighton seafront and passes through famous landmarks such as the Royal Pavilion, Brighton Pier, West Pier and Brighton Marina.

In 2014 the Brighton Half Marathon was named as one of eight events in the Vitality Run Series alongside the Liverpool Half Marathon, Reading Half Marathon, Oxford Half Marathon, Bath Half Marathon, North London Half Marathon, Hackney Half Marathon and British 10k London Run.

On 31 March 2017 it was announced that the course used for the 2015–2017 races was 146 metres (0.09 miles) short of the full distance and that the times of the runners in the three races are likely to be expunged from official records. This came after the organisers had previously apologised for the course being 0.32 miles too long in 2012.

== Recent winners ==
Key: Course record

Edition	Year	Date	Men's winner	Time (h:m:s)	Women's winner	Time (h:m:s)
1st	1990		David Knight (GBR)	c.1:07:xx		
2nd	1991		Ian Smith (GBR)	1:11:59	Julie Ince (GBR)	1:27:34
5th	1995		Simon Ratner (GBR)	1:07:27	Libby Jones (GBR)	
6th	1996	25 February	Geoff Hill (GBR)	1:09:08	Janice Moorekite (GBR)	1:19:19
7th	1997		Kurt Hoyte (GBR)	1:11:27	Jane Boulton (GBR)	1:20:53
8th	1998		Leigh Beard (GBR)	1:09:50	Julia Cornford (GBR)	1:19:57
9th	1999		Richard Szade (GBR)	1:09:59	Julie Briggs (GBR)	1:20:11
10th	2000	27 February	Sam Kigo (GBR)	1:11:15	Shona Crombie (GBR)	1:18:42
11th	2001	25 February	Neville Adams (GBR)	1:10:03	Judy Oakley (GBR)	1:21:06
12th	2002	24 February	Patrick Davoren (GBR)	1:11:42	Juliette Clark (GBR)	1:23:35
13th	2003	23 February	Neville Adams (GBR)	1:11:38	Samantha Baines (GBR)	1:22:26
14th	2004	22 February	James Baker (GBR)	1:10:33	Linda Murdoch (GBR)	1:24:11
15th	2005	20 February	Ross Grant (GBR)	1:11:39	Chris Naylor (GBR)	1:23:01
16th	2006	19 February	Robbie James (GBR)	1:12:27	Renata Antropik (POL)	1:23:33
17th	2007	18 February	James Baker (GBR)	1:08:33	Gill Wheeler (GBR)	1:21:38
18th	2008	17 February	Dave Carter (GBR)	1:11:17	Naomi Warner (GBR)	1:18:33
19th	2009	22 February	James Baker (GBR)	1:10:19	Loretta Sollars (GBR)	1:21:31
20th	2010	21 February	David Wardle (GBR)	1:06:59	Fiona Powell (GBR)	1:23:40
21st	2011	20 February	David Wardle (GBR)	1:06:22	Fiona Powell (GBR)	1:20:58
22nd	2012	18 February	Matthew Dumigan (GBR)	1:10:23	Fiona Powell (GBR)	1:21:44
23rd	2013	17 February	Paul Martelletti (GBR)	1:07:30	Emma Taylor-Gooby (GBR)	1:18:06
24th	2014	16 February	Paul Martelletti (GBR)	1:05:52	Sarah Hill (GBR)	1:18:13
25th	2015	22 February	Paul Martelletti (GBR)	1:05:48	Julia Davis (GBR)	1:18:23
26th	2016	28 February	Paul Martelletti (GBR)	1:04:53	Leigh Lattimore (GBR)	1:15:52
27th	2017	26 February	Jonathan Tipper (GBR)	1:08:37	Eleanor Davis (GBR)	1:14:27
28th	2018	25 February	Paul Pollock (IRL)	1:06:57	Izzy Coomber (GBR)	1:19:00
29th	2019	24 February	Paul Navesey (GBR)	1:04:56	Fiona de Mauny (GBR)	1:20:26
30th	2020	23 February	Kevin Moore (IRE)	1:09:05	Phillipa Williams (GBR)	1:17:55
31st	2021	10 October	Paul Navesey (GBR)	1:08:10	Bobby Searle (GBR)	1:22:25
32nd	2022	27 February	Ross Skelton (GBR)	1:07:48	Charlotte Ragan (GBR)	1:19:16
33rd	2023	26 February	Cal Mills (GBR)	1:06:38	Charlotte Ragan (GBR)	1:18:26
34th	2024	26 February	Marshall Smith (GBR)	1:07:17	Cassie Thorp (GBR)	1:15:34
35th	2025	2 March	Seyfu Jamaal (GBR)	1:04:30	Christa Cain (GBR)	1:16:19

== See also ==
- List of half marathon races
- Brighton Marathon
