= Kibor =

Kibor is a surname of Kenyan origin that may refer to:

- Joan Kibor (born 1989), Kenyan volleyball player
- Joseph Kibor (born 1972), Kenyan cross country runner
- Willy Kibor Koitile (born 1986), Kenyan marathon runner and winner of the 2011 Shanghai Marathon

== See also ==
- Felix Kibore (born 1988), Kenya-Qatari long-distance runner
- Kyiv Interbank Offer Rate, known under the acronym KIBOR
