= Liverpool Half Marathon =

British annual road running event held in Liverpool

Coordinates: 53°24′15.7″N 2°59′41.6″W

- Date: March
- Location: Liverpool, England
- Event type: Road
- Distance: Half marathon
- Established: 1994; 32 years ago
- Course records: 1:06:23 (men); 1:15:53 (women)
- Website: btrliverpool.com

The Liverpool Half Marathon is a British annual road running event held on the streets of Liverpool. It has previously been sponsored by Vitality and Mizuno Corporation.

== Overview ==
The course generally starts in the city centre, then goes up Parliament Street and turns south towards Sefton Park and Otterspool before proceeding north along the waterfront back towards the centre.

In 2014, the Liverpool Half Marathon was named as one of the eight events in the Vitality Run Series alongside the Brighton Half Marathon, Reading Half Marathon, Oxford Half Marathon, Bath Half Marathon, North London Half Marathon, Hackney Half Marathon and British 10k London Run.

From 2016 onwards, the event featured a 10-mile race running along a similar route.

== Past winners ==
Finishers Medal from the 2017 Liverpool Half Marathon

Key: Course record

Edition	Year	Date	Men's winner	Time (h:m:s)	Women's winner	Time (h:m:s)
8th	2002	1 September	Neo Molema (RSA)	1:03:49	Cathy Mutwa (KEN)	1:19:20
9th	2003	12 October	Wilson Kogo Kiptoo (KEN)	1:04:56	Yelena Burykina (RUS)	1:15:01
10th	2004	10 October	Zachary Kihara (KEN)	1:05:21	Hawa Hussein (TAN)	1:18:07
11th	2005	13 March	Simon Kasimili (KEN)	1:04:15	Debra Mason (GBR)	1:13:02
12th	2006	19 March	Andi Jones (GBR)	1:05:24	Birhan Dagne (GBR)	1:15:01
13th	2007	25 March	Ben Fish (GBR)	1:07:15	Liz Hawker (GBR)	1:17:35
14th	2008	2 March	Ben Fish (GBR)	1:08:01	Jenny Blizard (GBR)	1:15:53
15th	2009	29 March	Stuart Stokes (GBR)	1:10:20	Sarah Ridehalgh (GBR)	1:23:46
16th	2010	28 March	Paul Sankey (GBR)	1:13:25	Julie Briscoe (GBR)	1:16:57
17th	2011	20 March	Ben Fish (GBR)	1:07:41	~~Lauren Jeska~~ (GBR)	~~1:19:03~~ (Note: All of Jeska's results were declared null and void when she failed to produce samples of her testosterone levels.)
18th	2012	18 March	Bartosz Mazerski (POL)	1:08:41	Caroline Walsh (GBR)	1:21:25
19th	2013	17 March	Josh Lilly (GBR)	1:06:23	Linda Howell (GBR)	1:22:59
20th	2014	23 March	Andrew Davies (GBR)	1:09:52	Nikki Boyde (GBR)	1:26:16
21st	2015	29 March	Paul Martelletti (GBR)	1:08:00	Michelle Poulsen (DEN)	1:21:04
22nd	2016	13 March	Dejene Gezimu (ETH)	1:06:59	Michelle Nolan (GBR)	1:20:21
23rd	2017	2 April	Dejene Gezimu (ETH)	1:05:52	Michelle Nolan (GBR)	1:19:38
24th	2018	25 March	Jonathan Mellor (GBR)	~~1:03:36~~	Kirsty Longley (GBR)	~~1:16:30~~ (Note: The route of the 2018 event was found to be slightly short and so will not count as a course record.)
25th	2019	10 March	Daniel Kestrel (GBR)	1:11:01	Ellen Mcleod (GBR)	1:28:00
26th	2020	15 March	Alistair Rutherford (GBR)	1:09:51	Charlotte Mason (GBR)	1:21:52
27th	2022	27 March	Ben Taylor (GBR)	1:10:40	Chloe Wilkinson (GBR)	1:23:02
