= Kiprugut =

Kiprugut is a surname of Kenyan origin meaning "son of Rugut". Notable people with the surname include:

- Meriem Wangari Kiprugut (born 1979), Kenyan road running athlete
- Wilson Kiprugut (1938–2022), Kenyan middle-distance runner and two-time Olympic medallist
