= Michelle Ross =

Michelle Ross may refer to:

- Michelle Ross-Cope, a British athlete,
- Michelle Ross (drag queen), a Canadian drag entertainer.
