= GHM (disambiguation) =

GHM may refer to:

- Guitar Hero: Metallica, a 2009 music rhythm video game
- Guitar Hero Mobile series, the Guitar Hero game series
- Global Harvest Ministries, the Christian mission organisation
- Guwahati Half Marathon, an annual road running event held on the streets of Guwahati, India
- Centerville Municipal Airport (Tennessee), the IATA code GHM
- Gaza Health Ministry, the Palestinian government agency
- Guangdong–Hong Kong–Macao Greater Bay Area, megalopolis in south China
