= Great Cumbrian Run =

- Date: October
- Location: Carlisle, Cumbria, England
- Event type: Road
- Distance: Half marathon
- Established: 1982; 44 years ago
- Course records: 1:03:35 (men); 1:15:48(women)
- Website: cumbrianrun.co.uk

The Great Cumbrian Run is an annual half marathon road running event held in Carlisle, Cumbria, England. Dave Cannon finished first in the inaugural Cumbrian Run in 1982 completing the course in 1:05:06 while Francis Bowen of Kenya holds the race record of 1:03:35 achieved in 2004.

== Recent winners ==
Edition	Year	Date	Men's winner	Time (h:m:s)	Women's winner	Time (h:m:s)
21	2003	12 Oct	Kassa Tadesse	1:06:04	Sandra Branney	1:22:41
22	2004	17 Oct	Francis Bowen	1:03:35	Catherine Mutwa	1:16:30
23	2005	16 Oct	Joseph Kibor	1:05:51	Joyce Kandie	1:15:48
24	2006	15 Oct	Tomas Abyu	1:08:22	Jane Kangara	1:17:13
25	2007	14 Oct	Peter Riley	1:08:59	Rachel Crowe	1:23:50
26	2008	19 Oct	David Kirkland	1:10:42	Judith Nutt	1:24:18
27	2009	25 Oct	David Kirkland	1:12:17	Gill Laithwaite	1:25:26
28	2010	10 Oct	Ian Crampton	1:13:13	Joasia Zakrzewski	1:23:47
29	2011	2 Oct	James Buis	1:11:16	Vicky Hindson	1:25:12
30	2012	7 Oct	Jon Fletcher	1:11:18	Jilly Woodthorpe	1:17:14
31	2013	6 Oct	James Buis	1:11:38	Sarah Burrell	1:27:07
32	2014	5 Oct	Julian Hatcher	1:11:22	Philippa Wakefield	1:28:38
33	2015	4 Oct	Robert Hodgson	1:12:25	Kirsty Hamilton	1:25:17
34	2016	2 Oct	Marc Rigg Brown	1:09:31	Lydia Chapman	1:21:47
35	2017	1 Oct	Marc Rigg Brown	1:09:29	Alison Matthews	1:28:05
36	2018	7 Oct	Marc Rigg Brown	1:08:19	Lydia Chapman	1:22:08
37	2019	6 Oct	Marc Rigg Brown	1:07:52	Karen Smith	1:28:24
38	2022	2 Oct	Mark Emmerson	1:12:22	Lauren Graham	1:27:42
39	2023	1 Oct	Nathan Postill	1:11:53	Imogen Nicole Bungay	1:27:17
40	2024	6 Oct	Adrian Holliday	1:12:05	Chloe Kendal	1:21:34
41	2025	5 Oct	Marc Rigg Brown	1:08:12	Emma Neil	1:22:27

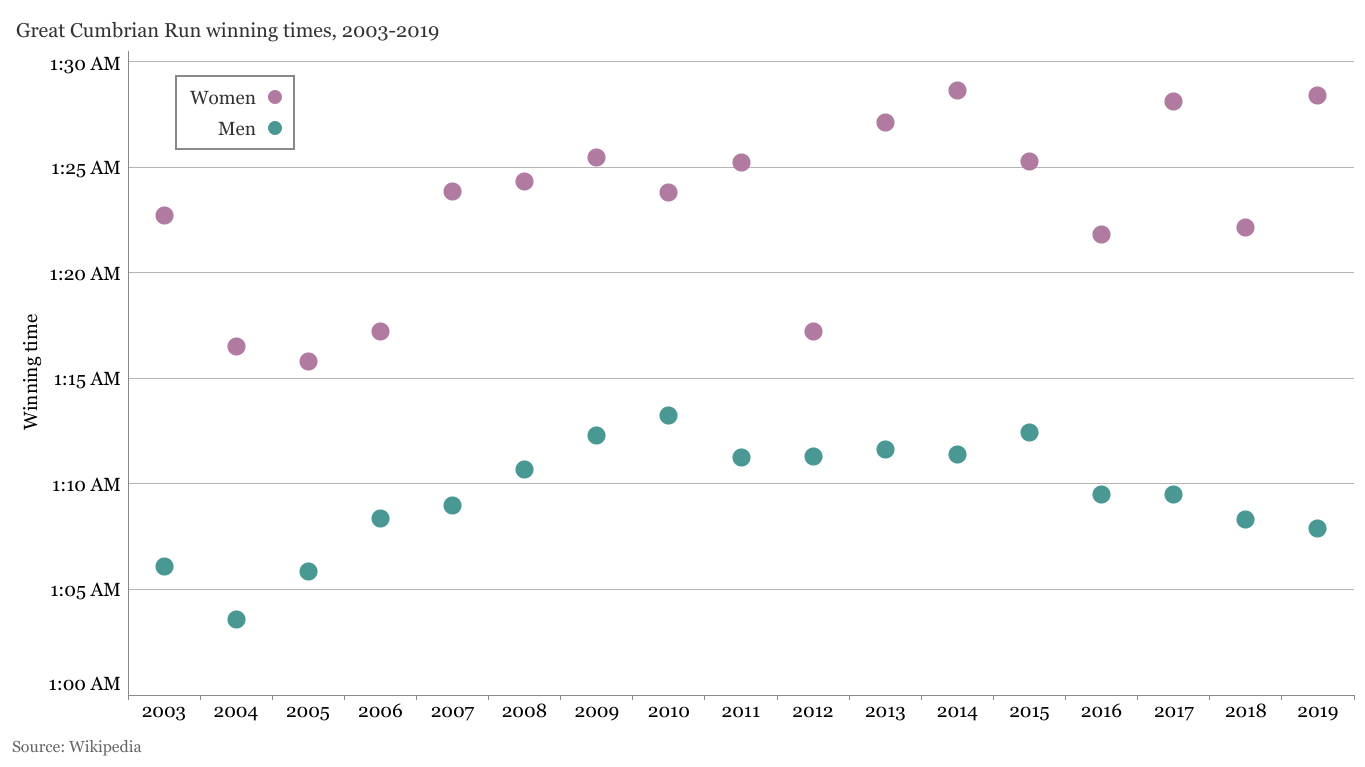
Scatterplot of men's and women's winning race times in the Great Cumbrian Run, 2003-2019
