= Debra Mason =

British long-distance runner (born 1968)

Debra "Debbie" Mason (born 31 January 1968) is a British long-distance runner. She represented Great Britain running the marathon at the 2005 World Championships in Athletics. She also represented England in two Commonwealth Games.

== Career ==
Mason had suffered from anorexia and returned to running with her daughter. She was a member of Sutton-in-Ashfield Harriers Athletics Club when she won the Dublin Marathon in 2001, in a time of 2:35:40, running as Robinson. She then joined Tipton Harriers. The Dublin performance enabled her to represent England at the 2002 Commonwealth Games marathon, where she finished fourth and was top woman from the United Kingdom. In 2003 a win at the Bath Half Marathon and competing in the 2003 IAAF World Half Marathon Championships secured her place on the world stage.

Mason missed out on the 2004 Olympics, but beating Tracey Morris into second place in the Liverpool Half Marathon followed by a London Marathon time of 2:36:59 qualified her for a place at the 2005 World Championships in Athletics, with Paula Radcliffe, Hayley Haining, Mara Yamauchi and Liz Yelling And also a place on the England squad for the Marathon at the 2006 Commonwealth Games. Although she did not finishing at either of these events.

Mason did complete the Half Marathon at the 2005 IAAF World Half Marathon Championships.

== Competition record ==
Year	Competition	Venue	Position	Event	Notes
Representing Great Britain and England
2001	Dublin Marathon	Dublin, Ireland	1st	Marathon	2:35:40 (PB)
2002	Commonwealth Games	Manchester, United Kingdom	4th	Marathon	2:39:42
2003	World Half Marathon Championships	Vilamoura, Portugal	42nd	Half Marathon	1:16:08
2003	Bath Half Marathon	Bath, United Kingdom	1st	Half Marathon	1:11:57 (PB)
2005	Liverpool Half Marathon	Liverpool, United Kingdom	1st	Half Marathon	1:13:02
2005	London Marathon	London, United Kingdom	13th	Marathon	2:36:59
2005	World Championships in Athletics	Helsinki, Finland	DNF	Marathon	DNF
2005	World Half Marathon Championships	Edmonton, Canada	52nd	Half Marathon	1:19:32
2006	Four Villages Half Marathon	Helsby, United Kingdom	1st	Half Marathon	1:14:31
2006	Commonwealth Games	Melbourne, Australia	DNF	Marathon	DNF
2008	Nottingham Marathon	Nottingham, United Kingdom	1st	Marathon	2:53:16
