= Tomas Abyu =

British-Ethiopian long-distance runner

Tomas Abyu (born 5 May 1978) is an Ethiopian-born British long-distance runner.

Abyu grew up in the Arsi region of Ethiopia, as a junior he trained with Gezahegne Abera. Abyu left Ethiopia where his father had been killed in the civil war. He came to the United Kingdom as a political refugee and was given asylum in 2000, becoming a British citizen in 2005.

Abyu made his marathon debut in Manchester in October 2002, winning the event in 2:25:28. He transferred allegiance in 2006 becoming eligible to represent Great Britain in athletics.

He improved to record a marathon personal best of 2:10:37, finishing second, at the Dublin Marathon in Oct 2007. The time was better than Beijing Olympic British team qualifying time (2:12), but the Dublin Marathon was not a recognized event, so Abyu needed to meet the qualifying time at the 2008 London Marathon. Unfortunately he finished in a time of 2:15:49, placed 16th and the second Britain behind Dan Robinson.

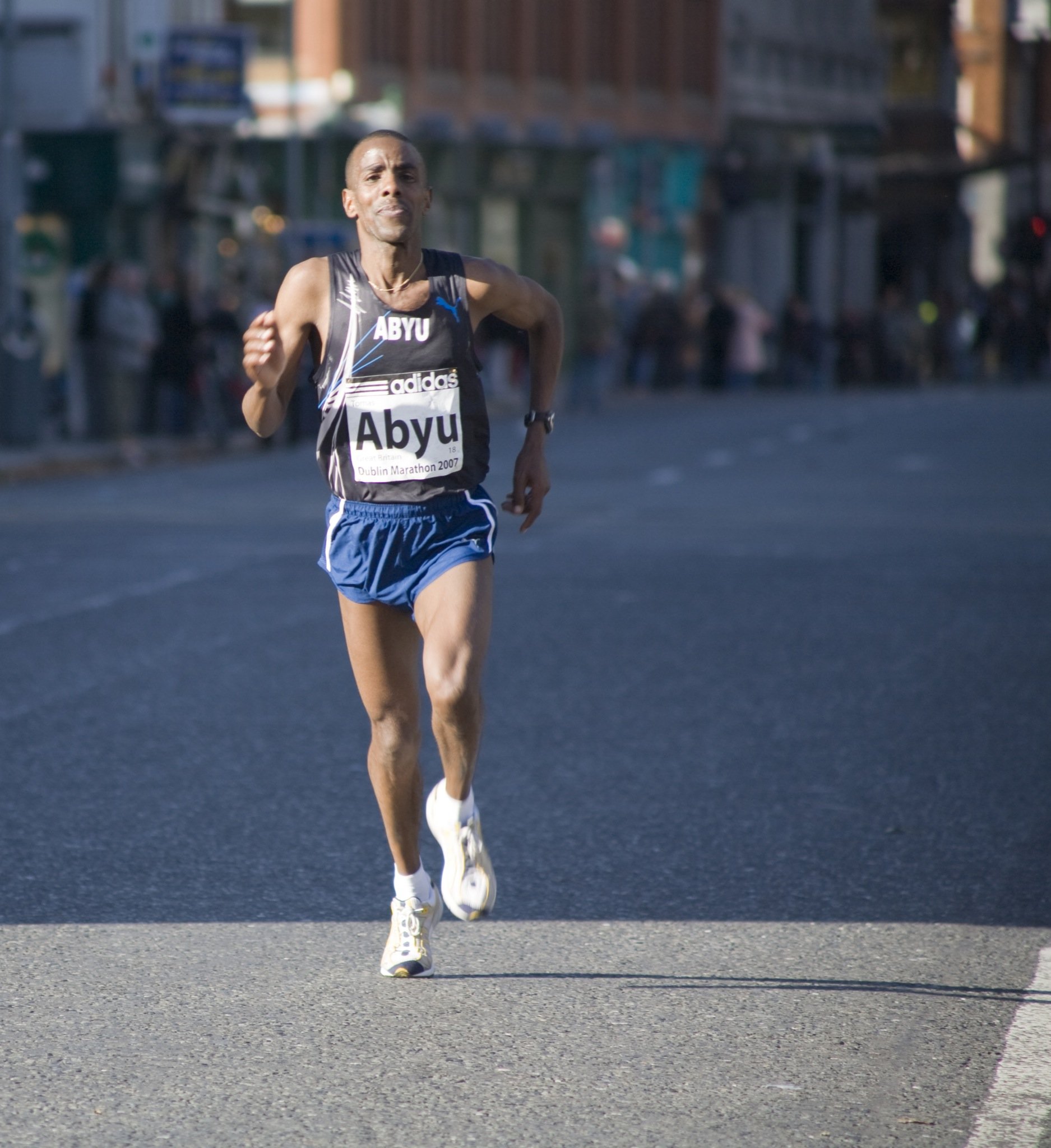
Tomas Abyu, is an Ethiopian-born British long-distance runner.

== International competition ==
Year	Competition	Venue	Position	Event	Notes
Representing Great Britain
2006	2006 European Athletics Championships	Gothenburg, Sweden	27th	Marathon	2:20:45

== Other Races ==
Year	Competition	Venue	Position	Event	Notes
2003	Loch Ness Marathon	Inverness, UK	1st	Marathon	2:20:59
2003	Sheffield Marathon	Sheffield, UK	1st	Marathon	2:27:42
2006	London Marathon	London, UK	16th	Marathon	2:15:50
2006	Sheffield Half Marathon	Sheffield, UK	1st	Half Marathon	1:04:05
2006	Great Cumbrian Run	Carlisle, UK	1st	Half Marathon	1:08:22
2006	Windsor Half Marathon	Windsor, UK	1st	Half Marathon	1:06:27
2007	Watford Half Marathon	Watford, UK	1st	Half Marathon	1:04:50
2007	Four Villages Half Marathon	Helsby, UK	1st	Half Marathon	1:04:56
2007	Great North Run	Newcastle upon Tyne, UK	4th	Half Marathon	1:02:50 (PB)
2007	Dublin Marathon	Dublin, Ireland	2nd	Marathon	2:10:37 (PB)
2008	London Marathon	London, UK	16th	Marathon	2:15:49
2008	Four Villages Half Marathon	Helsby, UK	1st	Half Marathon	1:05:22
2009	London Marathon	London, UK	19th	Marathon	2:20:09
2010	Loch Ness Marathon	Inverness, UK	1st	Marathon	2:20:50
2011	London Marathon	London, UK	28th	Marathon	2:21:25
2011	Loch Ness Marathon	Inverness, UK	1st	Marathon	2:20:50
2011	Windsor Half Marathon	Windsor, UK	1st	Half Marathon	1:10:05
2012	Jersey Marathon	Jersey, UK	1st	Marathon	2:24:43
2014	Loch Ness Marathon	Inverness, UK	1st	Marathon	2:22:41
