= Sheffield Half Marathon =

Annual running event in Sheffield, England

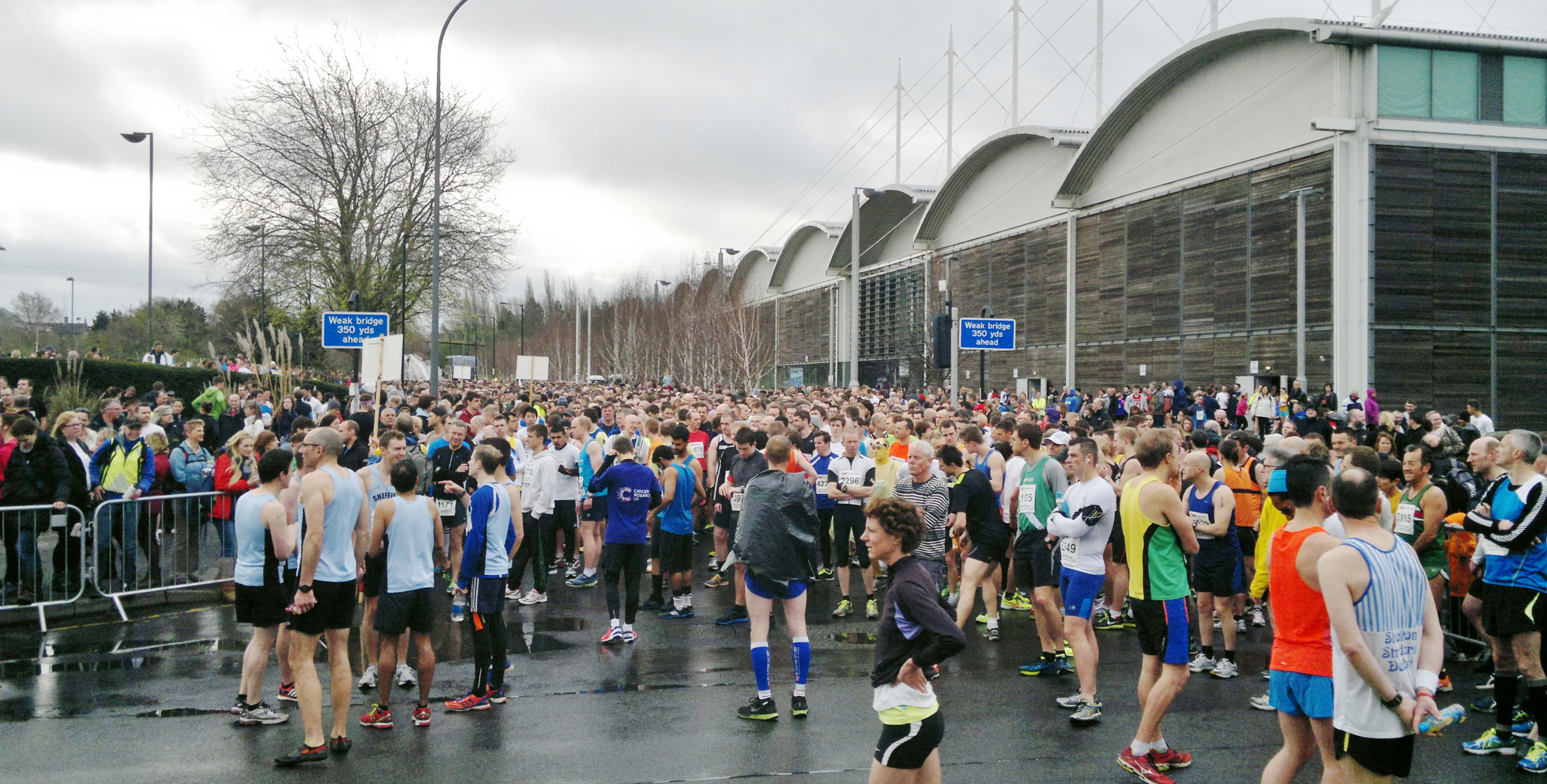
Runners await the start of the 2014 Sheffield Half Marathon

The Sheffield Half Marathon is an annual half marathon held in Sheffield, England. It was started as a marathon in 1929 for two years, with a half marathon run at the same time. It restarted again 1946 after the Second World War. In 2003 it was reduced to a half marathon and 3-kilometre fun run. Moving from Hillsborough in 1991, the race started and finished at Don Valley Stadium, the stadium where Jessica Ennis trained, until the stadium's closure was announced in 2013. The race is gold graded by UK Athletics.

The 10 chosen charities for the 2009 event were Sheffield Teenage Cancer Trust, Motor Neurone Disease Association South Yorkshire, Macmillan Cancer Support, Myasthenia Gravis Association, RSPCA Sheffield, Multiple Sclerosis Therapy Centre South Yorkshire, Sheffield Wildlife Trust, Marie Curie Cancer Care, Sheffield Royal Society for the Blind and Bluebell Wood Children’s Hospice.

The 2009 Sheffield Half Marathon was sponsored by SIG Insulations and took place on 26 April 2009 at Sheffield International Venues managed facility Don Valley Stadium at 9:30 am.

The 2010 Marathon was held 25 April.

The 2014 race, on 6 April, was due to start and finish at the Don Valley Stadium, but was cancelled at the last minute due to the expected delivery of water bowsers not arriving. South Yorkshire Police initially set up roadblocks in order to try to stop those runners that had set off, but later decided to let them carry on for safety reasons. Despite the cancellation, organisers refused to refund runners, which one entrant described as "pretty disgusting". Deputy Prime Minister and Sheffield Hallam MP Nick Clegg called for a "full explanation" of how the "farcical situation" was allowed to happen.

From 2015, the race relocated to the city centre, with the starting point on Arundel Gate and the finish line on Pinstone Street. The route took runners up Ecclesall Road and out to Ringinglow, before returning through Dore and back down Ecclesall Road. It was re-branded as the Plusnet Yorkshire Half Marathon as part of the Run For All Yorkshire Marathon series. The new route features over 850 feet of elevation gain in the first 5 and a half miles, including a category 3 climb. In addition to the overall race time, runners are timed on a single-mile climb (King/Queen of the Hill) and a 10 km mostly downhill "sprint" section.

== Recent winners ==
=== Half Marathon ===
Year	Date	Men's winner	Time (h:m:s)	Women's winner	Time (h:m:s)
2019	14 April	Jamie Hall	1:11:16	Phillipa Williams	1:17:25
2018	8 April	William Mycroft	1:11:12	Nicola Squiresr	1:19:21
2017	9 April	Steven Bayton	1:09:25	Sarah Lowery	1:20:25
2016	10 April	John Franklin	1:10:24	Zanthe Wray	1:22:59
2015	12 April	Dave Archer	1:13:20	Sharon Barlow	1:22:59
2014	Cancelled				
2013	12 May	Ben Fish	1:06:51	Julie Briscoe	1:16:17
2012	27 May	John Franklin	1:10:31	Nicola Squires	1:21:22
2011	8 May	Fergus Meade	1:11:32	Nicola Clay	1:21:17
2010	25 April	Andrew Pearson	1:07:04	Natalie Burns	1:23:24
2009	26 April	Jason Ward	1:08:02	Rebecca Robinson	1:14:52
2008	27 April	Zachary Kihara	1:05:12	Nicola Clay	1:18:53
2007	20 May	Simon Tonui	1:05:00	Banuelia Katesigwa	1:17:34
2006	14 May	Tomas Abyu	1:04:05	Pauline Powell	1:17:47
2005	1 May	Simon Tonui	1:04:46	Cathy Mutwa	1:15:31
2004	2 May	Eric Kiplagat	1:04:50	Miriam Wangari	1:16:16
2003		William Musyoki	1:09.44	Yelena Burykena	1:22.20
2002		Mohamed el Sadicki	1:08.36	Penny Thackray	1:18.44
2001		Andrew Aked	1:09.57	Kate Rice	1:24.56
2000	16 April	Mohammed Fahiti	1:07.11	Chaanah Patton	1:18.59
1999		Andrew Weatherill	1:07.40	Kate Burge	1:17.52
1998		Carl Thackery	1:06.03	Carol Wolstenholme	1:26.07
1997		Kassa Tadassa	1:05.45	Jane Shields	1:15.55
1996		Trevor Wilson	1:09.50	Carol Wild	1:25.29
1995		Tony Duffy	1:07.57	Jenny Pearson	1:26.23
1994		Tony Duffy	1:09.00	Deborah Shaw	1:25.03
1993		Peter Whitehead	1:05.17	Sally Eastall	1:16.37
1992	28 June	Julius Gombedeza	1:04.36	Julia Sakare	1:18.04
1991	Not held due to 1991 World Student Games				
1990		John Tollerfield	1:07.28	Jane Shields	1:18.07
1989		Roy Bailey	1:08.15	Clare Crofts	1:24.52
1988	19 June	Chris Parkes	1:07.40	Carol Moore	1:25.32
1987		Sam Carey	1:08.07	Sarah Singleton	1:24.08
1986		Roy Bailey	1:07.32	Jenny Pearson	1:22.23
1985		Tim Leader	1:08.30	Jenny Pearson	1:25.30
1984		Chris Maddocks	1:11.06	J Clarke	1:22.27
1983		Dave Allen		D Bennett	
1982		Trevor Fieldsend		J Hulbert	

=== Marathon ===
Year	Date	Men's winner	Time (h:m:s)	Women's winner	Time (h:m:s)
2003	1 June	Tomas Abyu	2:27:42	Sarah Heatley	3:17:38
2002	28 April	Darren Hale	2:34:17	Helen Burrell	2:55:23
2001	29 April	Darren Hale	2:30:17	Ruth Whitehead	3:06:47
2000		Darren Hale	2:35:30	Sally Keigher	3:06:40
1999		Dennis Walmsley	2:29:06	Eleanor Robinson	2:59:39
1998		Richard Ironmonger	2:30:56	Elizabeth Allott	2:55:19
1997		Andrew Weatherill	2:28:37	Eleanor Robinson	2:58:13
1996		Chris Parkes	2:20:04	Eleanor Robinson	2:59:58
1995		Jonathan Hooper	2:27:14	Eleanor Robinson	2:58:44
1994		Dave Bond	2:29:31	Sarah Kriel	3:18:14
1993		John Boyes	2:24:36	Eleanor Robinson	2:58:23
1992	28 June	Dave Bond	2:26:05	Janet Kelly	3:05:00
1991		Dave Bond	2:25:35	Caroline Boyd	2:55:05
1990		Ken Moss	2:26:16	Janet Kelly	2:49:05
1989		Trevor Hawes	2:31:53	Caroline Boyd	3:08:14
1988	19 June	Trevor Hawes	2:26:01	Dora Hopkinson	3:04:52
1987		Trevor Hawes	2:26:29	Pat Hudson	3:04:33
1986		Sam Carey	2:26:09	Helene Diamantides	3:25:01
1985		Trevor Hawes	2:23:55	Dors Hopkinson	3:14:37
1984		Trevor Hawes	2:26:21	Dawn Harris	3:16:34
1983		Trevor Hawes	2:23:23	Dawn Harris	2:59:40
1982		Malcolm Martin	2:29:49	Jenny Pearson	3:01:41
