= Wokingham Half Marathon =

Half-marathon in England

The Wokingham Half Marathon is an annual half marathon held in Wokingham, Berkshire, England since 1984. The race currently starts and finishes at Cantley Park. It is a UK Athletics BARR Gold Graded Event. The 2008 event attracted a field of over 2,500 runners. The 2009 event, due to be held on 8 February, was cancelled due to adverse weather conditions and rearranged to May.

The course record is held by Phil Wicks who ran in 1:03:14 in 2012. The Ladies record was set in 2008 by Liz Yelling who ran in 1:11:09.

== Recent winners ==
Edition	Year	Date	Men's winner	Time (h:m:s)	Women's winner	Time (h:m:s)
37th	2025	23 February	Joshua Grace	1:05:31	Annabel Gummow	1:12:59
36th	2024	25 February	Alexander Tuetan	1:04:48	Lauren Reed	1:13:39
35th	2023	26 February	Scott Cousins	1:05:10	Lauren Reed	1:14:14
34th	2022	27 February	Joshua Grace	1:06:06	Naomi Mitchell	1:11:53
33rd	2020	23 February	Jonathan Cornish	1:07:13	Louise Damen	1:16:24
32nd	2019	24 February	Matthew Clowes	1:04:06	Hayley Munn	1:16:51
31st	2018	18 February	Scott Overall	1:05:11	Naomi Mitchell	1:17:55
30th	2017	12 February	Toby Spencer	1:05:48	Joanne Harvey	1:18:10
29th	2016	21 February	Paul Pollock	1:03:46	Caryl Jones	1:14:35
28th	2015	8 February	Paul Martelletti	1:04:18	Hayley Munn	1:15:43
	2014	Cancelled due to flooding				
27th	2013	10 February	Adam Bowden	1.05.53	Emily Wicks	1.14.16
26th	2012	19 February	Phil Wicks	1.03.14	Liz Yelling	1.12.58
25th	2011	13 February	Phil Wicks	1.04.10	Liz Yelling	1.13.44
24th	2010	21 February	Jean Ndyasenga	1.04.48	Liz Yelling	1.16.53
23rd	2009	24 May	David Webb	1.04.50	Sarah Gee	1.18.10
22nd	2008	10 February	Toby Lambert	1.05.41	Liz Yelling	1.11.09
21st	2007	11 February	Williard Chinhanhu	1.04.52	Alice Braham	1.17.19
20th	2006	12 February	Huw Lobb	1.06.07	Melanie Ellis	1.17.46
19th	2005	13 February	Dai Roberts	1.12.50	Alice Braham	1.20.14
18th	2004	8 February	Jerome Claeys	1.08.37	Michelle Lee	1.15.39
17th	2003		Ronnie Adams	1.10.39	Liz Hartney	1.19.37
	2002	Event not held				
16th	2001		Andrew Hennesy	1.10.39	Sarah Bradbury	1.17.31
15th	2000		Mark Flint	1.06.04	Annie Emerson	1.15.52
14th	1999		David Taylor	1.08.42	Gill O’Connor	1.21.32
13th	1998		Vince Garner	1.06.55	Leslie Leggart	1.21.47
12th	1997		Paul Harris	1.07.50	Tracie Swindell	1.16.34
11th	1996		Gary Bishop	1.06.54	Mandy Whittington	1.20.17
10th	1995		Peter Haynes	1.05.26	Jackie Leak	1.17.44
9th	1994		Wayne Buxton	1.08.41	Jill Taylor	1.20.33
8th	1993		Mark Curzons	1.08.18	Tanya Ball	1.21.22
	1992	Event not held				
7th	1991		David Taylor	1.08.41	Paula Fudge	1.15.59
6th	1990		M Scheyt	1.08.38	Janet Kelly	1.20.36
5th	1989		Mike Hurd	1.08.29	Nicky McCracken	1.16.56
4th	1988		Rob Watts	1.06.52	Rosemary Ellis	1.17.34
3rd	1986		Bill Glad	1.08.36	Norma Blackwood	1.24.56
2nd	1985		Mike Bliss	1.08.00	Karen Whapshot	1.21.38
1st	1984		Mike Hurd	1.06.59	Jane Davies	Unknown
