= Daniel Studley =

British long-distance runner

Personal information
- Nationality: Great Britain
- Born: 1 January 1992 (age 33) Bristol, England
- Home town: Oxford, England

Sport
- Country: Great Britain
- Sport: Long-distance running
- Event: 10k – marathon
- Club: Bristol & West AC

Daniel Studley (born 1 January 1992) is a British long-distance runner.

In 2012, he made his England Athletics debut at the Cross de Atapuerca in Burgos, Spain. In 2015, Dan won the England Athletics 10k Championships in Leeds, England. In 2018, he competed in the men's half marathon at the 2018 IAAF World Half Marathon Championships held in Valencia, Spain. He finished in 102nd place. In 2019, he won the men's race of the Windsor Half Marathon held in Windsor, United Kingdom.

== Personal Bests ==
Event	Time	Date	Place
1500m	3:43.64	31 May 2014	Manchester, England
5000m	13:53.55	19 July 2018	Dublin, Ireland
10000m	29:15.41	19 May 2018	London, England
5k Road	14:02	19 February 2015	Armagh, Northern Ireland
10k Road	29:16	5 March 2023	Manchester, England
Half Marathon	1:03:58	10 February 2019	Barcelona, Spain
Marathon	2:18:23	1 December 2019	Valencia, Spain

== Course Records ==
Event	Time	Date
Wiltshire 10 Mile	49:34	12 February 2017
Stratford Summer Six	29:57	22 July 2017
Bourton 10k	30:05	24 February 2019
