= Rocky River Run =

- Date: late May / early June
- Location: Rockhampton
- Event type: road
- Distance: Half-marathon
- Established: 2007
- Website: http://7rockyriverrun.com.au/

The Rocky River Run (currently branded as the 7 Rocky River Run for sponsorship reasons) is a half-marathon fun run held in the Australian city of Rockhampton in either late May or early June each year.

The event also incorporates 10-kilometre, 5-kilometre and 2-kilometre events. The courses are centred around Rockhampton's Fitzroy River and all except the 2-kilometre course traverse the heritage-listed Alexandra Bridge and the Fitzroy Bridge.

The Rocky River Run began when the local Rotary Club created the event in 2007 with just 358 entrants competing but has steadily grown in popularity.

Rotary continued to organise the Rocky River Run until it grew so large it became difficult for the community group to organise and were considering cancelling the event in 2016. However, they reached an agreement with local employment agency Capricorn Training Company to take over the organisation of the event.

In 2017, the Seven Network became the official naming rights sponsor.

The event celebrated its 10th anniversary in 2017.

In recent years, the number of competitors has been fluctuating around 2000 competitors.

The event is held as a way to raise money for charities, namely youth suicide preventative and mental health initiatives such as RUOK? Day.

In 2017, the event raised $15,000 for R U OK? Day initiatives and another $15,000 for Ronald McDonald House Charities.

Originally commencing from Victoria Park in Wandal, the Rocky River Run moved to the newly redeveloped Quay Street riverside precinct in the city in 2017.

== Results ==
The winners of the Rocky River Run half-marathon and their recorded times since 2013:

Year	Men's winner	Time (h:m:s)	Women's winner	Time (h:m:s)
2017	Louis McAfee	01:12:21	Kiarra Walters	01:27:52
2016	Glen Yarham	01:17:21	Clare O'Brien	01:24:20
2015	Chris Pollock	01:15:22	Anna McMurtrie	01:25:19
2014	Paul Tucker	01:16:52	Katie Keohane	01:31:37
2013	Paul Tucker	01:17:07	Leah Cheal	01:30:14

== See also ==
- Bridge to Brisbane
- Gold Coast Half Marathon
- List of half marathon races
