= Becky Briggs =

British long-distance runner

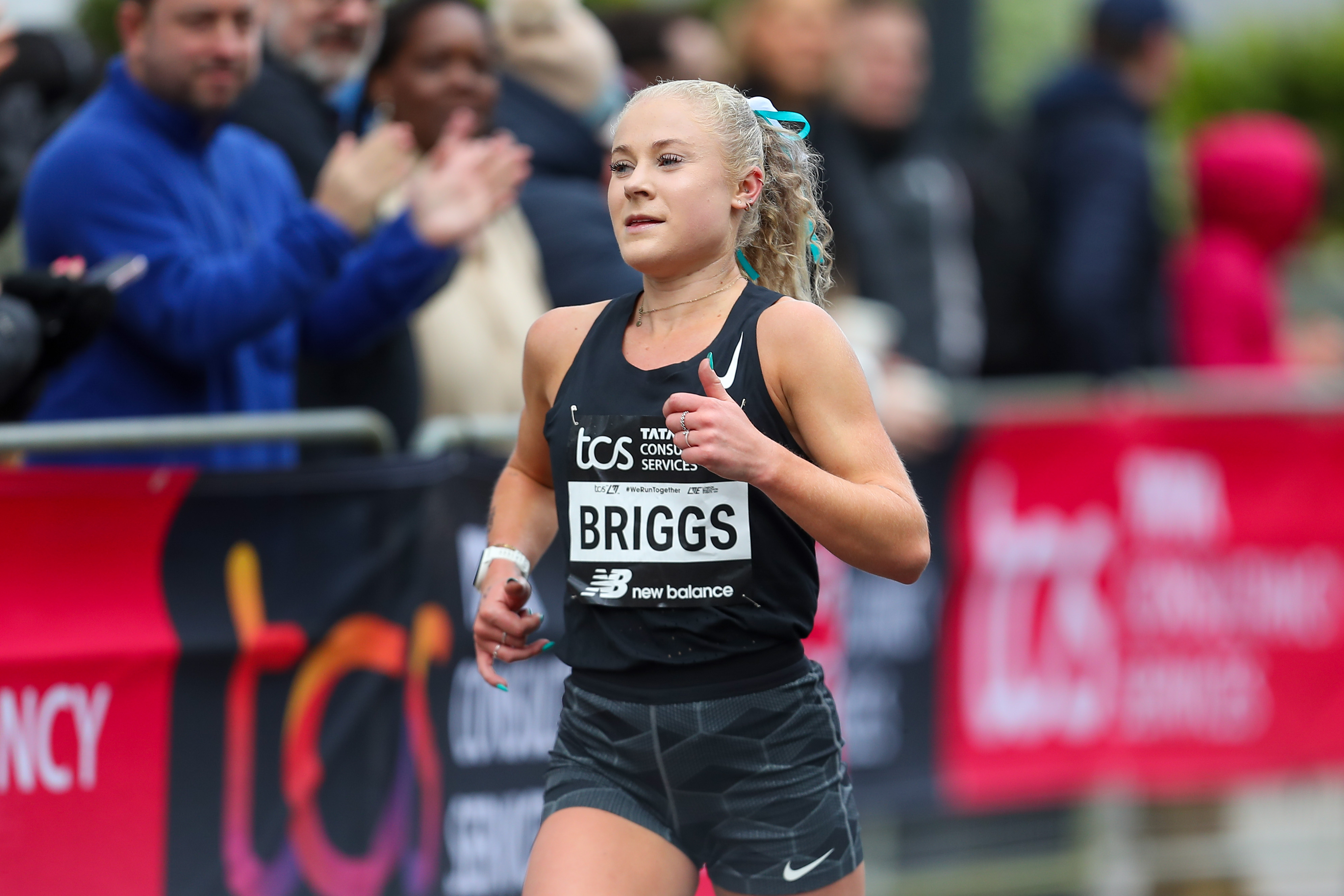
- Briggs (2024 London Marathon)

Personal information
- Born: 2 March 2000 (age 26)

Sport
- Country: United Kingdom
- Sport: Long-distance running

Becky Briggs (born 2 March 2000) is a British long-distance runner. She competed in the women's half marathon at the 2020 World Athletics Half Marathon Championships held in Gdynia, Poland.

== Career ==
In 2019, Briggs competed in the junior women's race at the IAAF World Cross Country Championships held in Aarhus, Denmark. In 2020, she won the Bath Half Marathon held in Bath, United Kingdom.

Briggs competed at the 2021 British Athletics Marathon and 20km Walk Trial held in Kew Gardens, London hoping to qualify for the 2020 Summer Olympics in Tokyo, Japan.

In 2025, Briggs won the Hackney Half held in London, United Kingdom.

== Achievements ==
Year	Competition	Venue	Position	Event	Notes
Representing United Kingdom
2020	Bath Half Marathon	Bath, United Kingdom	1st	Half marathon	1:14:34
2020	World Championships (HM)	Gdynia, Poland	64th	Half marathon	1:13:08
2022	Manchester Marathon	Manchester, United Kingdom	1st	Marathon	2:29:06
2024	Bath Half Marathon	Bath, United Kingdom	1st	Half Marathon	1:14:24
2025	Hackney Half	London, United Kingdom	1st	Half Marathon	1:14:20
