= Manchester Marathon =

Annual race in the United Kingdom held since 2012

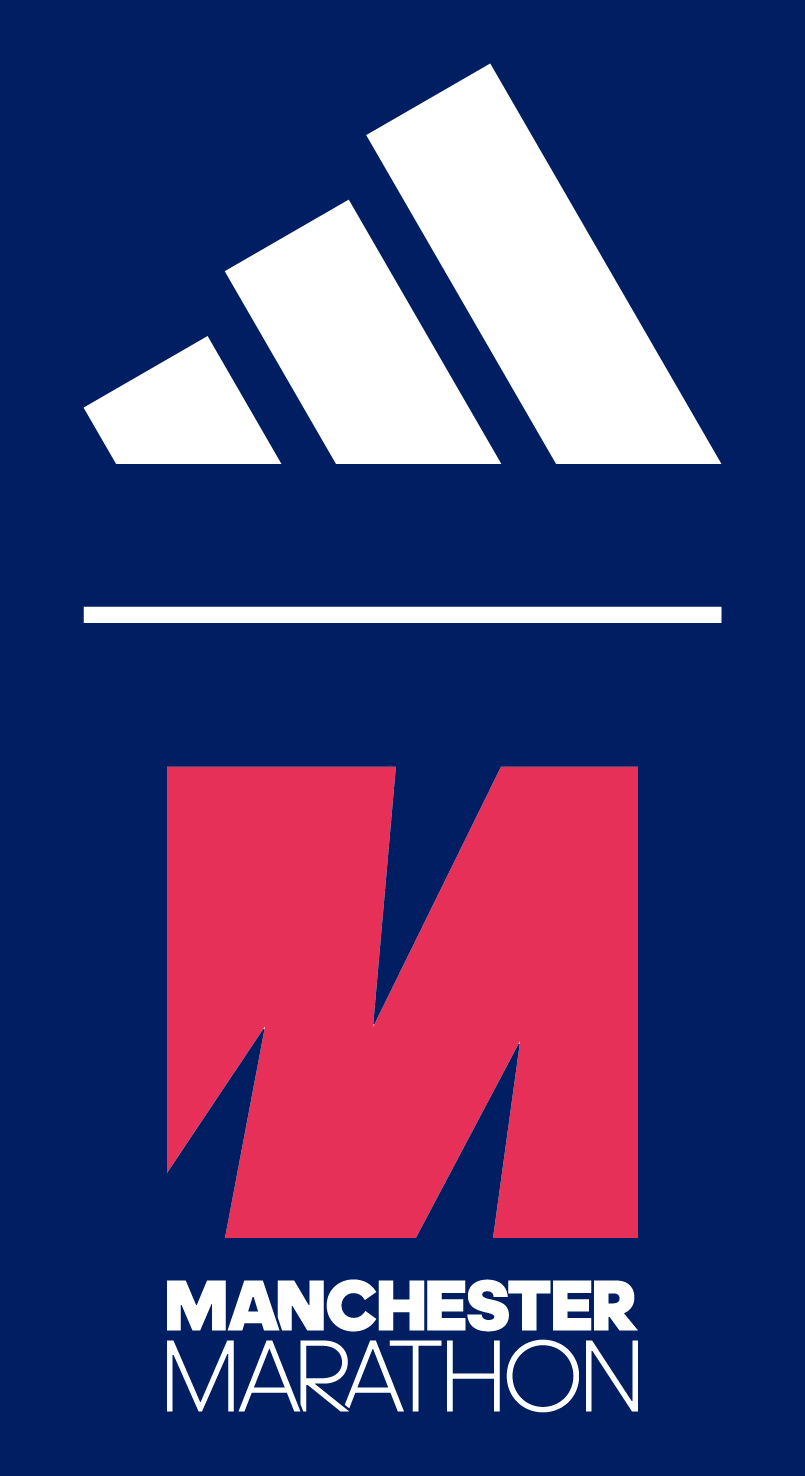
- Date: 27 April 2025
- Location: Greater Manchester, England, UK
- Event type: Road
- Distance: Marathon
- Primary sponsor: Adidas
- Established: 2012 (14 years ago)
- Website: www.manchestermarathon.co.uk
- Participants: 21887 finishers (2024)

The Manchester Marathon is a long-distance running event in Greater Manchester, England. It was known as the Greater Manchester Marathon until the word "Greater" was dropped beginning with the (cancelled) 2020 edition of the race. The most recent marathon was held on 19th April 2026. The race was first held in 2012. It is claimed that the race is the flattest marathon course in the UK, with only 54 metres (177 ft) of elevation. The 2013, 2014 and 2015 Greater Manchester Marathon times have been declared invalid after the course was found to be 380 m (1,250 ft) too short.

== History ==
The first marathon in the Manchester area was run in 1908 and started and finished at the Saracen's Head pub in Warburton, although at this point the run was only 20 mi (32 km). The first marathon to be run over 26 mi and 385 yards (42.195 km) was the race in 1909, which started in Sandbach, Cheshire and finished at the Fallowfield Stadium in Manchester. A marathon has been run along various routes in the Manchester area intermittently throughout the years with various start and finish points. Until 2012, the last marathon to be held in the city was in 2002, with the 10 km (6.2 mi) Great Manchester Run superseding it as the major running event in Manchester.

The 2020 edition of the race was cancelled due to the coronavirus pandemic, with all entries automatically remaining valid for 2021, and all registrants given the options of transferring their entry to another runner for a 10 GBP fee or obtaining a refund minus a 5 GBP administration fee. (Note: It had initially been postponed before being cancelled.)

Similarly, the 2021 edition of the race, originally scheduled for April, was postponed to 10 October 2021 due to the pandemic.

== Course ==
The current course starts on Trafford Way, near to Manchester United's Old Trafford Stadium and finishes on Oxford Road, close to All Saint's Park. Previous routes have finished at Old Trafford cricket ground and passed a number of famous Manchester landmarks, including the Old Trafford football ground. It works its way through Chorlton, Hulme, Old Trafford, Stretford, Sale, Timperley, Altrincham, Urmston, Salford, and Manchester City Centre.

The 2013, 2014 and 2015 route was subsequently found to be 380 m (1,250 ft) short of the correct distance.

From 2020, the route changed to allow the inclusion of a 3 miles (4.8 km) loop through the city centre.

=== Invalid races ===
The 2013, 2014 and 2015 Greater Manchester Marathon times have been declared invalid after the course was found to be 380 m (1,250 ft) too short in 2016. Subsequently, UK Athletics do not recognise times from those races. The error was corrected in time for the 2016 marathon. The Association of UK Course Measurers (AUKCM) said an accredited measurer had ridden the course in 2013 but indicated there had been an error in the calibration of the bicycle wheel. Marathon courses are measured out using a bicycle fitted with a counter to calculate distance by the turning of the wheels.

== Winners ==
Key:

Course record

Ed.	Year	Date	Men's winner	Time	Women's winner	Time	Rf.
14	2026	19 Apr	Yohan Lidove	2:15:19	Naomi Robinson	2:36:56	
12	2024	14 Apr	Adam Clarke	2:16:29	Charlie Arnell	2:37:14	
11	2023	16 Apr	Ignas Brasevicius	2:16:27	Naomi Mitchell	02:31:27	
10	2022	3 Apr	Jonny Mellor	2:10:46	Becky Briggs	02:29:06	
9	2021	10 Oct	Matt Crehan	2:18:26	Anna Bracegirdle	02:40:17	
	2020	cancelled due to coronavirus pandemic					
8	2019	7 Apr	Aaron Richmond	2:21:34	Jenny Spink	2:35:19	
7	2018	8 Apr	Shadrack Tanui	2:21:19	Dani Nimmock	2:38:22	
6	2017	2 Apr	Patrick Martin	2:22:37	Georgie Bruinvels	2:37:03	
5	2016	10 Apr	Steven Bayton	2:22:34	Kelly Crickmore	2:48:04	
4	2015	19 Apr	Paul Martelletti	~~2:17:47~~	Georgie Bruinvels	~~2:37:21~~	
3	2014	6 Apr	Andi Jones	~~2:16:59~~	Emily Wicks	~~2:38:26~~	
2	2013	28 Apr	Dave Norman	~~2:20:19~~	Issy Menzies	~~2:42:24~~	
1	2012	29 Apr	Dave Norman	2:24:50	Rebecca Johnson	3:05:26	

== Prizes ==
Past Prizes prizes of equal value were awarded to men and women as follows (2025 not confirmed):

- 1st prize £2,000 cash
- 2nd prize £1,000 cash
- 3rd prize £750 cash
- 4th prize £300 cash
- 5th prize £200 cash

Elite wheelchair athletes

- 1st prize £1,000 cash
- 2nd prize £500 cash
- 3rd prize £375 cash

== See also ==
- List of marathon races in Europe
