= Robert Wambua Mbithi =

Kenyan long-distance runner

Robert Wambua Mbithi (born 26 June 1989) is a male long-distance runner from Kenya.

== Achievements ==
Year	Competition	Venue	Position	Event	Notes
2016	Reading Half Marathon	Reading, United Kingdom	1st	Half marathon	1:03:57
2016	Hastings Half Marathon	Hastings, United Kingdom	1st	Half marathon	1:04:51
2016	Bath Half Marathon	Bath, United Kingdom	1st	Half marathon	1:01:45
2015	Phillips Piła Half Marathon	Piła, Poland	1st	Half marathon	1:02:29
2015	Wtórpol Half Marathon	Skarzysko-Kamienna, Poland	1st	Half marathon	1:03:27
2014	Wtórpol Half Marathon	Skarzysko-Kamienna, Poland	1st	Half marathon	1:03:15
2013	Indianapolis Monumental Half Marathon	Indianapolis, United States	1st	Half marathon	1:03:37
