= Loch Ness Marathon =

Annual marathon race in Scotland

- Date: Late September / Early October
- Location: Inverness, Scotland
- Event type: Road
- Distance: Marathon, 10K, 5K
- Primary sponsor: Baxters
- Established: 2002
- Course records: Men's: 2:19:26 (2024) (United Kingdom) Moray Pryde; Women's: 2:42:04 (2019) (United Kingdom) Katie White
- Website: Official website
- Participants: 3,504 finishers (2023); 2,637 finishers (2021); 3,584 (2019)

The Loch Ness Marathon (Gaelic: Marathon Loch Nis) is an annual marathon race in Scotland, held along the famous loch, Loch Ness, ending in Inverness. The event is part of the Festival of Running, held annually at the beginning of October. This also includes a 10K race and a 5K fun run, and attracts over 8,000 participants across all of the events. The first prize in the marathon is approx 1,400 GBP.

The marathon starts near Whitebridge, and follows the southern side of Loch Ness, passing through the villages of Foyers, Inverfarigaig and Dores. The route goes into Inverness, crossing the River Ness by the Ness Bridge in the city centre, and finishes at Bught Park.

The marathon supports several charities, including Highland Hospice, Leonard Cheshire, Maggie's Cancer Caring Centres, Marie Curie Cancer Care, Multiple Sclerosis Society Scotland, and the Scottish Community Foundation. The lead partner charity since 2013 has been Macmillan Cancer Support, who have been involved in the event since 2009.

Kenyan Zakary Kihara was a convincing winner of the 2007 Baxters Loch Ness Marathon in a time of 2 hours 23 minutes. The women's race was won by Banuelia Katesigwa from Tanzania in a time of 2:55. The 2007 event saw 5600 people take part in the three main events - marathon, 10 km, and the 5 km with fifty different nationalities were represented.

In 2005 Simon Pride from Fochabers won in 2:30:15 whilst Julia Myatt won the women's event in 2.51.56. 18 nationalities were represented in the 2005 event.

Winners of the 2010 event were Tomas Abyu of Salford Harriers in a time of 2:20:50 and Dinknesh Mekash Tefera from Ethiopia in 02:46:37, a new course record for the women's race.

== Past winners ==
Key: Course record

Edition	Year	Men's winner	Time (h:m:s)	Women's winner	Time (h:m:s)
1st	2002	Eric Kiplagat (KEN)	2:33:36	Addy Gerrard (GBR)	2:57:06
2nd	2003	Tomas Abyu (ETH)	2:20:59	Trudi Thomson (GBR)	2:50:42
3rd	2004	Simon Pride (GBR)	2:27:58	Jan Roxburgh (GBR)	2:59:57
4th	2005	Simon Pride (GBR)	2:30:15	Julia Myatt (GBR)	2:51:52
5th	2006	Zachary Njoroge (KEN)	2:22:17	Helen Cherono (KEN)	2:46:54
6th	2007	Zachary Njoroge (KEN)	2:23:17	Banuela Katesigwa (TAN)	2:55:04
7th	2008	Ezekiel Cherop (KEN)	2:28:03	Banuela Katesigwa (TAN)	2:51:23
8th	2009	Simon Tanui (KEN)	2:20:13	Joyce Kirui (KEN)	2:48:25
9th	2010	Tomas Abyu (ETH)	2:20:50	Dinkinesh Mekash (ETH)	2:46:39
10th	2011	Tomas Abyu (ETH)	2:20:50	Lisa Finlay (GBR)	2:59:14
11th	2012	Ross Houston (GBR)	2:20:24	Avril Mason (GBR)	2:54:54
12th	2013	Elly Tarus (KEN)	2:27:21	Megan Crawford (GBR)	2:46:37
13th	2014	Tomas Abyu (ETH)	2:22:41	Jennifer Emsley (GBR)	2:46:10
14th	2015	Elly Tarus (KEN)	2:25:19	Megan Crawford (GBR)	2:44:50
15th	2016	Mohammed Abu-Rezeq (JOR)	2:20:52	Jennifer Wetton (GBR)	2:47:03
16th	2017	Mohammed Abu-Rezeq (JOR)	2:22:02	Lesley Pirie (GBR)	2:48:10
17th	2018	Mohammed Abu-Rezeq (JOR)	2:22:56	Sheena Logan (GBR)	2:51:11
18th	2019	Isaiah Kosgei (KEN)	2:29:31	Katie White (GBR)	2:42:04
19th	2021	Stuart Livingstone (GBR)	2:32:21	Megan Crawford (GBR)	2:48:15
20th	2022	Dougie Selman (GBR)	2:23:52	Jemima Farley (GBR)	2:42:36
21st	2023	Moray Pryde (GBR)	2:22:04	Melissah Gibson (AUS)	2:43:45
22nd	2024	Moray Pryde (GBR)	2:19:26	Melissah Gibson (AUS)	2:54:39
