= 20 Kilomètres de Paris =

Road running event in Paris, France

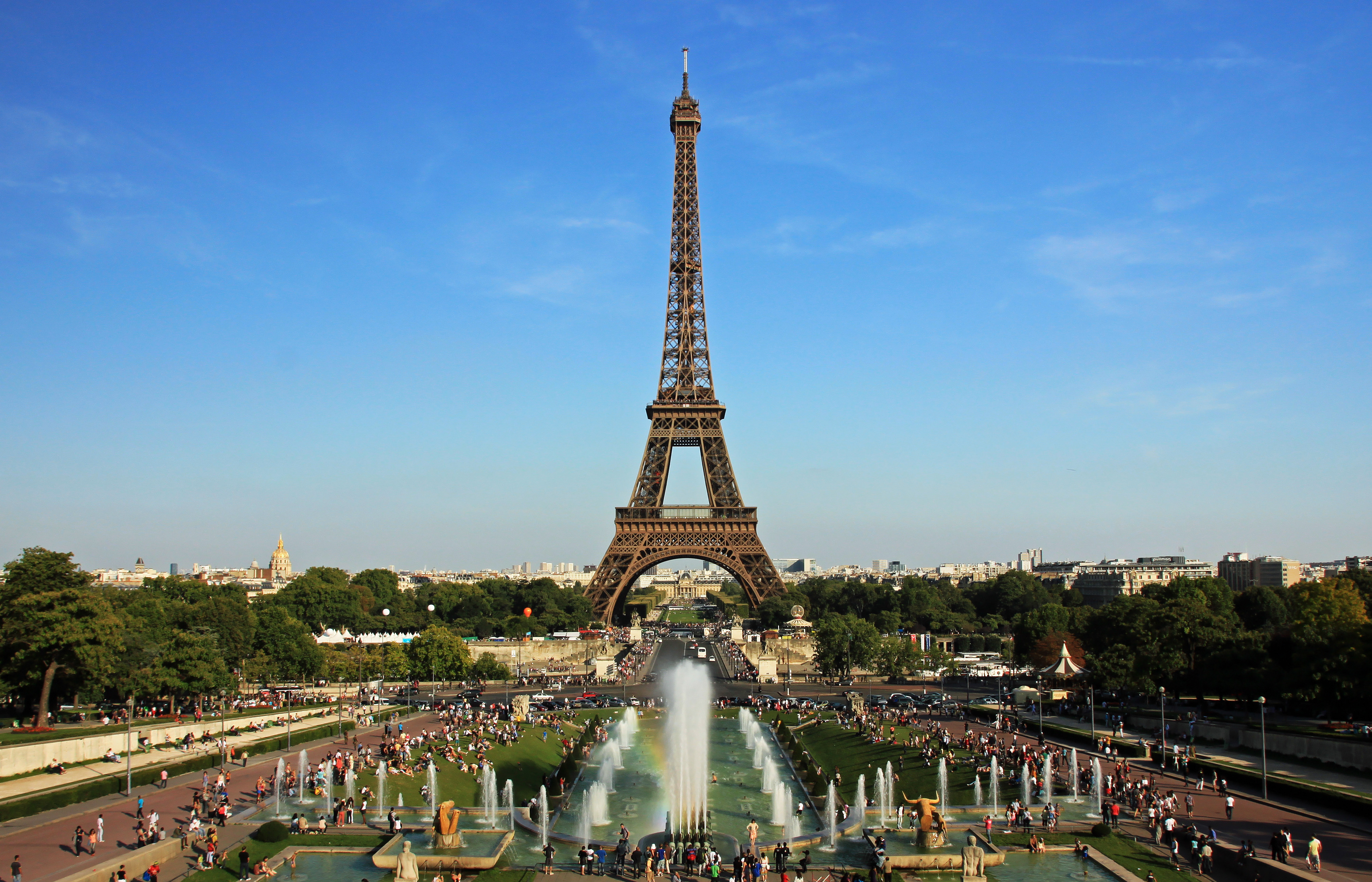
- The start point is near the Eiffel Tower
- Date: October
- Location: Paris, France
- Event type: Road
- Distance: 20 km
- Established: 1979
- Course records: Men's: 56:18 (2025) (France) Etienne Daguinos; Women's: 1:04:30 (2023) (Kenya) Gladys Jemaiyo
- Website: 20 Kilomètres de Paris
- Participants: 9,270 finishers (2021)

The 20 Kilomètres de Paris (Paris 20 km) is an annual road running competition over 20 kilometres which takes place on the streets of Paris, France in October. First held in 1979, the race attracts top level international competitors and holds IAAF Silver Label Road Race status.

The competition was the idea of Michel Jazy, a French runner who was an Olympic medallist and two-time European Champion. The first edition was held through a joint effort by the Council of Paris and ASCAIR (the French Airforce's body for sport). The race has been organised under the auspices of ASCAIR since then.

The course for the competition has a double looped, figure 8 style. The start point of the race is in the Trocadéro near the Eiffel Tower and runners then cross the River Seine over the Pont d'Iéna. It heads in an anti-clockwise loop through Bois de Boulogne before completing a smaller, clockwise loop along the banks of the Seine. The finish point is the Musée du quai Branly. The original race distance was 20.3 km, but this was reduced to 20 km in 1981. As a result of poor race organisation at the starting point, athlete's times from 1981 to 1992 are not accepted for record purposes; unusually quick times were recorded as some runners began the race a whole minute before the official starter's gun had been fired.

The men's and women's course records for the 20 km race are held by Kenyan athletes: Evans Cheruiyot completed the distance in 57:19 minutes in 2005 and Sarah Chepchirchir's time of 1:05:03 hours was set in 2013.

The race organisers abide by their own charter of ethics which – aside from outlining typical races rules and safety issues – includes the aims of increasing inclusion of women in the sport of running and promotion of environmentally friendly attitudes.

== Past winners ==
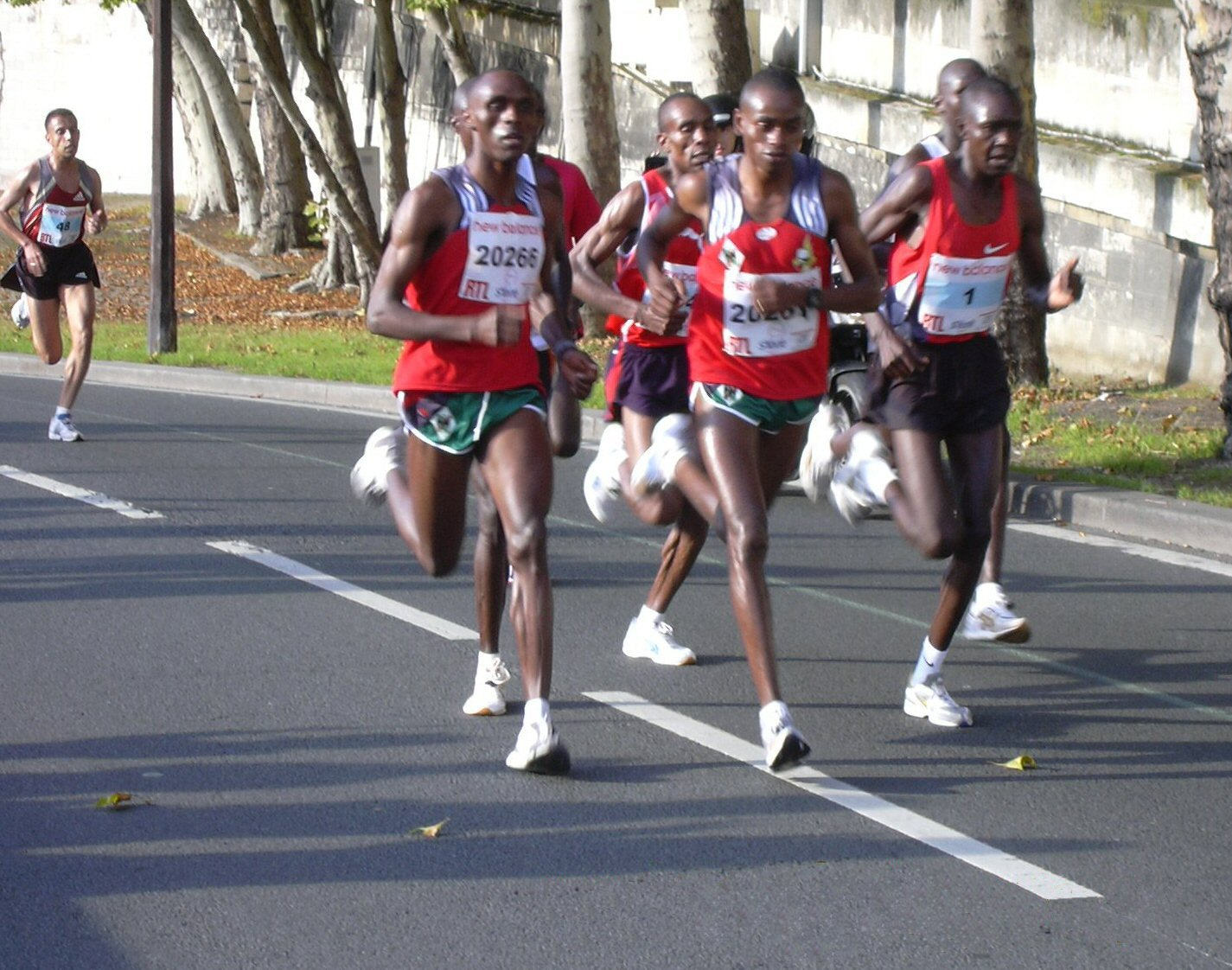
Elite level runners competing at the 2004 edition

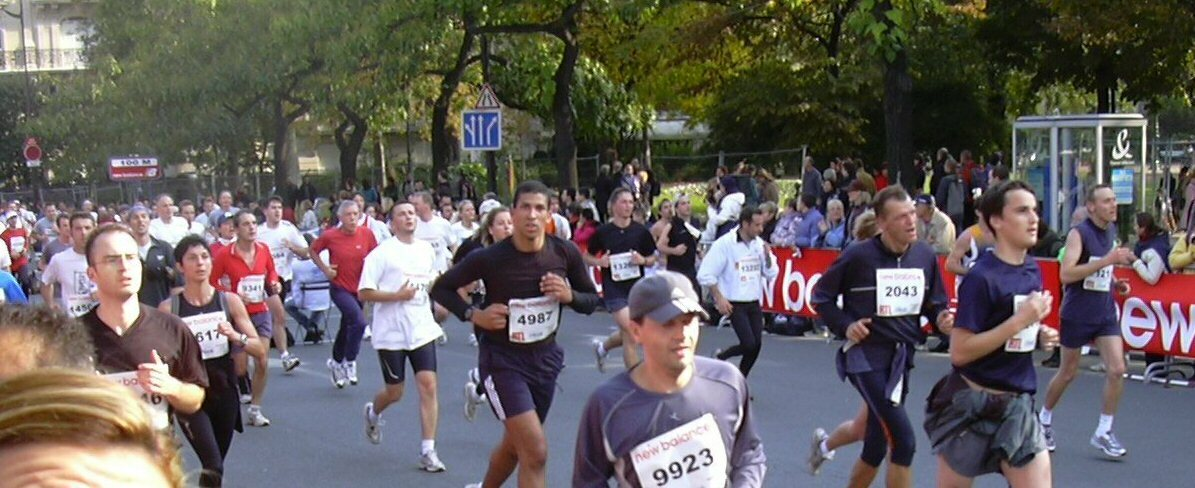
Scene of the mass amateur race in 2004

Key: Course record Timings invalid (False start or short course)

Edition	Year	Men's winner	Time (h:m:s)	Women's winner	Time (h:m:s)
1st	1979	Bram Wassenaar (NED)	1:01:30	Chantal Navarro (FRA)	1:11:29
2nd	1980	Mike McLeod (GBR)	1:02:53	Joëlle Audibert (FRA)	1:16:00
3rd	1981	Radhouane Bouster (FRA)	57:35	Annick Loir (FRA)	1:09:58
4th	1982	Jacques Boxberger (FRA)	57:47	Paula Fudge (GBR)	1:06:19
5th	1983	Thierry Watrice (FRA)	57:15	Joëlle De Brouwer (FRA)	1:07:14
6th	1984	Pierre Lévisse (FRA)	57:22	Sally-Ann Hales (GBR)	1:08:20
7th	1985	Colin Moore (GBR)	55:51	Sue Crehan (GBR)	1:06:21
8th	1986	Hussein Ahmed Salah (DJI)	57:19	Maria Rebelo (FRA)	1:06:34
9th	1987	Cor Lambregts (NED)	59:31	Agnes Pardaens (BEL)	1:08:39
10th	1988	Pierre Lévisse (FRA)	59:33	Maria Rebelo (FRA)	1:09:44
11th	1989	António Pinto (POR)	58:46	Rosa Mota (POR)	1:06:37
12th	1990	Mohammed Mourhit (BEL)	59:15	Dominique Rembert (FRA)	1:10:48
13th	1991	António Pinto (POR)	59:28	Natalia Artyemova (RUS)	1:09:37
14th	1992	Paul Arpin (FRA)	57:20	Nadezhda Ilyina (RUS)	1:09:34
15th	1993	Said Ermilli (MAR)	58:40	Hellen Kimaiyo (KEN)	1:06:37
16th	1994	Salah Hissou (MAR)	58:20	Iulia Negura (ROM)	1:08:04
17th	1995	Kenneth Cheruiyot (KEN)	58:45	Hellen Kimaiyo (KEN)	1:07:26
18th	1996	Elarbi Khattabi (MAR)	58:22	Joyce Chepchumba (KEN)	1:07:33
19th	1997	John Gwako (KEN)	57:35	Cristina Pomacu (ROM)	1:07:15
20th	1998	Hendrick Ramaala (RSA)	57:46	Hellen Kimaiyo (KEN)	1:06:21
21st	1999	Domingos Castro (POR)	57:54	Berhane Adere (ETH)	1:06:36
22nd	2000	Francis Wachira (KEN)	59:35	Hellen Kimutai (KEN)	1:05:28
23rd	2001	Philippe Remond (FRA)	1:02:17	Chantal Dällenbach (FRA)	1:10:50
24th	2002	Robert Cheruiyot (KEN)	57:38	Jeļena Prokopčuka (LAT)	1:06:44
25th	2003	Sammy Chumba (KEN)	58:26	Mestawet Tufa (ETH)	1:06:29
26th	2004	Sammy Chumba (KEN)	59:36	Lenah Cheruiyot (KEN)	1:07:36
27th	2005	Evans Cheruiyot (KEN)	57:19	Dire Tune (ETH)	1:08:17
28th	2006	John Kyui (KEN)	59:23	Florence Chepkirui (KEN)	1:10:52
29th	2007	Musau Mwanzia (KEN)	58:07	Meriem Wangari (KEN)	1:07:35
30th	2008	Sammy Kitwara (KEN)	57:42	Meriem Wangari (KEN)	1:08:05
31st	2009	Dieudonné Disi (RWA)	59:33	Meriem Wangari (KEN)	1:05:30
32nd	2010	John Mwangangi (KEN)	58:09	Rose Chelimo (KEN)	1:07:27
33rd	2011	John Mwangangi (KEN)	58:11	Sarah Chepchirchir (KEN)	1:06:04
34th	2012	Ezechiel Nizigiymana (BDI)	58:12	Cynthia Jerotich (KEN)	1:05:36
35th	2013	Tebalu Zawude (ETH)	58:07	Sarah Chepchirchir (KEN)	1:05:03
36th	2014	Muhajir Hiredin (ETH)	58:28	Rose Chelimo (KEN)	1:05:01
37th	2015	Stephen Ogari (KEN)	59:11	Nancy Kimaiyo (KEN)	1:06:03
38th	2016	Morhad Amdouni (FRA)	59:18	Etagegn Woldu (ETH)	1:06:24
39th	2017	Collins Chebii (KEN)	58:28	Gebayanesh Ayele (ETH)	1:06:02
40th	2018	Samuel Tsegay (ERI)	58:23	Ophélie Claude-Boxberger (FRA)	1:09:48
41st	2019	Enos Kales (KEN)	58:28	Naomi Jebet (KEN)	1:08:22
42nd	2021	Morhad Amdouni (FRA)	57:54	Samira Mezeghrane-Saad (FRA)	1:09:08
43rd	2022	Yann Schrub (FRA)	58:04	Cynthia Kosgei (KEN)	1:07:03
44th	2023	Elvis Chebor Tabarach (KEN)	57:32	Gladys Jemaiyo (KEN)	1:04:30
45th	2024	Mekonen Hayimoro Yele (ETH)	58:05	Manon Trapp (FRA)	1:04:46
46th	2025	Etienne Daguinos (FRA)	56:18	Mercy Chebwogen (KEN)	1:04:54
47th	2026	Daniel Tumaka Kosen (KEN)	57:11	Mekdes Woldu (FRA)	1:04:37
