= Barrathon =

Annual half marathon on the Isle of Barra, Outer Hebrides in Scotland

Coordinates: 56.955°N 7.495°W

The Barrathon was an annual half marathon which takes place on the Isle of Barra, which is the southernmost inhabited isle of the Outer Hebrides in Scotland. The Barrathon was initially a single event to mark the millennium, and a chance to raise some money for charity at the same time. The Charity was MacMillan Cancer Support.

== Recent winners ==
Table of recent winners.

Year	Date	Finishers	Time (h:m:s)	Men's winner	Time (h:m:s)	Women's winner
2000		37	1:21:06	Simon Axon	1:42:09	Marsie Ewing
2001		46	1:25:51	Simon Axon	1:46:36	Heather McIntosh
2002		64	1:18:08	Terence Coyle	1:41:46	Gillian Mckelvie
2003		89	1:15:37	Stuart Gibson	1:33:07	Isobel Knox
2004		87	1:16:23	Graham Beal	1:23:53	Janet Roxburgh
2005	2 July	98	1:22:16	Brendan Bolland	1:28:49	Megan Clarke
2006	1 July	114	1:13:13	Paul Freary	1:34:54	Isobel Knox
2007	30 June	129	1:14:25	Jamie Reid	1:35:52	Amanda Henderson
2008		156	1:21:44	Benjamin Kemp	1:28:28	Michelle Hetherington
2009	4 Jul	167	1:19:33	Graham Beal	1:31:07	Marietta Beal
2010		162	1:16:27	Phil Mowbray	1:27:52	Megan Wright
2011	2 July	227	1:15:00	Jamie Reid	1:31:36	Gillian Carr
2012		250	1:20:53	Andrew Laycock	1:32:17	Gloria White
2013	29 June	242	1:13:13	Neil Renault	1:30:10	Gloria White
2014	28 June	241	1:18:28	Ray Ward	1:27:12	Eilis McKechanie
2015	27 June	249	1:17:12	Ray Ward	1:30:14	Megan Mowbray
2016	25 June	233	1:19:22	Colin Doig	1:31:49	Megan Mowbray
2017	1 July	255	1:11:49	Tom Martyn	1:30:07	Georgia Tindley
2018	30 June	271	1:13:24	Fraser Stewart	1:29:38	Zanthe Wray
2019	29 June	277	1:12:23	Cameron Milne	1:26:02	Jennifer Wetton

== Route ==
The Barrathon route is a clockwise circuit of the island, following an undulating course, the lowest point being near sea level and the highest point being just under 350 ft.

The route starts in Castlebay at about 60 ft falling quickly to sea level before rising to 100 ft around the 1-mile mark. The next 0.5 miles is mainly downhill and then the course undulates between sea level and 50 ft until the 4-mile mark.

From mile 4, the course climbs gradually as the route starts to head east, peaking at around 170 ft just past the 5.5-mile stage. The next 1.5 miles see the route drop back to sea level as the 7-mile mark is approached.

From miles 7 to 9, the route starts to work its way round the east coast of the island over a number of short, small climbs ranging from 50 ft to 90 ft. This is quickly followed by a downhill 0.5-mile and a gently undulating course to the 10.5-mile mark. From here the route climbs steeply to 340 ft at the 11.5-mile stage.

The route offers some respite with a mile long descent followed by a short but sharp climb of approximately 40 ft before a fairly steady run to the finish point in Castlebay.

The course was officially measured in 2008 by a company on behalf of Scottish Athletics and meets the minimum distance for a half marathon. The official record is over the measured course.

== Fun Runs ==
There is also a "Fun Run" which is 3 miles. Runners must be 11 or over. Additionally, there is also a "Junior Fun Run" which is approximately 1 mile. The Junior Fun Run is for runners aged 4–10.
