= Great North West Half Marathon =

- Date: February
- Location: Blackpool
- Event type: Road
- Distance: Half marathon
- Course records: 1:06:48 (men); 1:16:58(women); Since 2004.
- Website: www.fyldecoastrunners.com/great-north-west-half-marathon.html

The Great North West Half Marathon is an annual road running event staged in Blackpool, United Kingdom. It is held in February and organised by the Fylde Coast Runners running club. The course is flat and popular as a training race for the London Marathon.

== Past winners ==
Since 2004 the only athletes to have won their event twice have been Mike Proudlove and Carly Needham.

Edition	Year	Date	Time (h:m:s)	Men's winner	Time (h:m:s)	Women's winner
32	2021	19 Sep	1:17:35	Karl Hodgson	1:42:29	Gemma Lysycia
31	2020	16 Feb	1:15:16	Tristan Windley	1:27:05	Rachel Brown
30	2019	17 Feb	1:10:41	Grant Johnson	1:29:23	Danielle Jepson
29	2018	18 Feb	1:14:38	Paul Fauset	1:19:14	Hayley Carruthers
28	2017	19 Feb	1:08:30	Chris Steele	1:24:12	Madeleine Bell
27	2016	21 Feb	1:16:52	Benjamin Douglas	1:28:07	Stephanie Burns
26	2015	22 Feb	1:12:35	Tom Charles	1:23:22	Sharon Barlow
25	2014	23 Feb	1:14:01	Ian McBride	1:25:10	Carly Needham
24	2013	24 Feb	1:08:54	Matthew John	1:23:55	Dianne McVey
23	2012	26 Feb	1:08:54	Luke Cragg	1:23:01	Helen Waugh
22	2011	27 Feb	1:10:03	Martin Williams	1:22:07	Carly Needham
21	2010	21 Feb	1:09:36	Stuart Robinson	1:22:22	Gemma Unsworth
20	2009	22 Feb	1:07:28	Chris Davies	1:16:58	Pauline Powell
19	2008	24 Feb	1:11:52	Garry Dixon	1:19:04	Shona McIntosh
18	2007	25 Feb	1:06:48	Martin Scaife	1:21:34	Jo Buckley
17	2006	26 Feb	1:12:11	Mike Proudlove	1:25:21	Hannah Cunningham
16	2005	27 Feb	1:08:55	Mike Proudlove	1:21:26	Jenny Carson
15	2004	29 Feb	1:10:10	Gearoid O'Connor	1:22:13	Jenny Murray
