= Four Villages Half Marathon =

- Date: January
- Location: Helsby, Cheshire
- Event type: Road
- Distance: Half marathon
- Course records: 1:04:36 (men); 1:13:08 (women)
- Website: www.helsbyrunningclub.org.uk/four-villages-half/

The Four Villages Half Marathon is an annual road running event held during January in Cheshire, United Kingdom. The race is organised by Helsby Running Club. The event's course passes through the villages of Dunham on the Hill, Mouldsworth, Manley, Alvanley and Helsby.

== History ==
The race was started in 1982 by staff from BICC, a manufacturing firm formerly located in Helsby. The race was inspired by the first London Marathon (which had been held on 29 March 1981), as well as to raise money to send a terminally ill local lad on the trip of a lifetime to Disneyland.

The original route was through the four villages of Thornton-le-Moors, Ince, Elton and Helsby. In 1999, the course was changed to a similar course to the current (with some adjustments along the way), passing Dunham-on-the-Hill, Mouldsworth, Manley and Helsby.

== Winners ==
Edition	Date	Time (h:m:s)	First Man	Time (h:m:s)	First Woman
41	19 Jan 2025	1:07:21	Daniel Cliffe	1:17:53	Kate Ward
40	21 Jan 2024	1:09:12	Matthew Rhys Collins	1:18:40	Rachael Burns
39	15 Jan 2023	1:07:51	Omar Ahmed	1:14:49	Anna Bracegirdle
38	16 Jan 2022	1:07:22	Michael Kallenberg	1:15:20	Anna Bracegirdle
	Jan 2021	Cancelled due to COVID-19			
37	19 Jan 2020	1:06:14	Mohammed Abu-Rezeq	1:14:31	Eleanor Whyman-Davis
36	20 Jan 2019	1:06:38	Mohammed Abu-Rezeq	1:18:08	Kirsty Longley
35	21 Jan 2018	1:09:09	Ben Fish	1:19:40	Gemma Connolly
34	15 Jan 2017	1:07:24	Mohammed Abu-Rezeq	1:19:18	Gemma Connolly
33	17 Jan 2016	1:07:06	Michael Kallenberg	1:22:46	Gemma Connolly
	18 Jan 2015	Cancelled due to bad weather			
32	19 Jan 2014	1:05:46	Mohammed Abu-Rezeq	1:19:23	Dianne McVey
	20 Jan 2013	Cancelled due to bad weather			
31	22 Jan 2012	1:08:32	Martin Williams	1:21:05	Gemma Connolly
30	23 Jan 2011	1:05:55	Neil Renault	1:14:31	Michelle Ross-Cope
29	17 Jan 2010	1:04:54	Dave Webb	1:15:02	Michelle Ross-Cope
28	18 Jan 2009	1:07:47	Neil Renault	1:21:21	Helen Waugh
27	20 Jan 2008	1:05:22	Tomas Abyu	1:16:05	Nicky Archer
26	21 Jan 2007	1:04:56	Tomas Abyu	1:16:59	Louise Gardner
25	22 Jan 2006	1:05:58	Andrew Norman	1:14:31	Debra Mason
24	23 Jan 2005	1:07:27	Michael Aspinall	1:14:48	Anna Pichrtova
23	18 Jan 2004	1:10:29	Simon Shiels	1:14:22	Tracey Morris
22	19 Jan 2003	1:05:23	Alastair O'Connor	1:16:56	Kate Burge
21	20 Jan 2002	1:04:36	Carl Warren	1:13:08	Marian Sutton
20	2001	1:07:29	Duncan Mason	1:20:04	Jackie Newton
19	2000	1:05:47	Duncan Mason	1:17:03	Angela Allen
18	1999	1:07:16	G Hill	1:18:29	J Newton
Course changed
17	1998	1:07:05	Simon Shiels	1:15:18	Alison Wyeth
16	19 Jan 1997	1:04:11	Kevin McCluskey	1:16:06	Carolyn Hunter-Rowe
15	21 Jan 1996	1:06:00	Mark Kinch	1:16:03	Trudi Thomson
14	22 Jan 1995	1:07:57	D Mansbridge	1:16:38	K Cornwall
13	1994	1:08:26	T Morrey	1:19:57	D Hoogesteger
12	24 Jan 1993	1:05:40	D Swanston	1:21:44	A Whitelaw
11	1992	1:05:21	C Sweeney	1:21:29	L Clarke
10	1991	1:06:03	Tony O'Kell	1:18:22	K Cornwall
9	1990	1:07:51	B Gillespie	1:22:55	Janice Needham
8	1989	1:05:13	Tony O'Kell	1:21:26	M Henry
7	1988	1:08:15	Tony O'Kell	1:19:59	M Henry (née Burke)
6	1987	1:05:58	R Lindsay	1:19:44	M Burke
5	1986	1:09:48	C Potter	1:23:35	J Littler
4	20 Jan 1985	1:09:22	D Vernon	1:20:53	G Nicholson
3	1984	1:06:10	S Anders	1:32:57	V Gillespie
2	1983	1:08:48	Stan Curran	1:23:56	Susan Catterall
1	1982	1:12:36	Mark Edwards	1:54:14	V Malchin
