= Joseph Kibor =

Kenyan long-distance runner

Joseph Kibor (born 22 December 1972) is a Kenyan runner.

At the 1997 World Cross Country Championships, he finished seventh in the long race, earning a place on the Kenyan team that won the team competition.

== Achievements ==
Year	Competition	Venue	Position	Event	Notes
Representing Kenya
1996	Great Scottish Run	Glasgow, United Kingdom	1st	Half Marathon	1:02:27
1997	Great Scottish Run	Glasgow, United Kingdom	1st	Half Marathon	1:01:46
1997	1997 IAAF World Cross Country Championships	Turin, Italy	7th	12.333 km	35:37
1998	Lille Half Marathon	Lille, France	1st	Half Marathon	1:01:46
1998	1998 IAAF World Half Marathon Championships	Uster, Switzerland	13th	Half Marathon	1:01:42
1999	Great Scottish Run	Glasgow, United Kingdom	1st	Half Marathon	1:02:36
2005	Windsor Half Marathon	Windsor, United Kingdom	1st	Half Marathon	1:06:52
2005	Great Cumbrian Run	Carlisle, United Kingdom	1st	Half Marathon	1:05:51
