= Guwahati Half Marathon =

- Date: 13 April 2025
- Location: Guwahati, India
- Event type: Marathon
- Distance: 6 km and 21 km
- Established: 30 August 2009
- Organizer: Indian Institute of Technology Guwahati
- Website: techniche.org.in/ghm

The Guwahati Half Marathon is an annual road running event held on the streets of Guwahati, India. The event is organised by the student body of Indian Institute of Technology, Guwahati. The fifteenth edition of the event took place on 13 April 2025.

== Overview ==
Guwahati Half Marathon was organised for the first time in August, 2009 under the Social Initiatives Module of Techniche, the annual Techno-Management festival of IIT Guwahati. The event received a great response from the Guwahati populace, with over 1000 participants in the two races organised - The Glory Run (18 km) and The Dream Run (6 km). One of the largest events of its kind to be managed entirely by a student body, the marathon has evolved coherently over the years to become the largest half Marathon in North East India. In 2010, Techniche introduced a 21-km cycle race with the motto of shaping the youth's attitude towards the environment with the motto "Youth for environment". As the years unfolded, the initiative grew, now standing as the largest of its kind in North-East India. Also in the same year, a new marathon was introduced, namely, the Courage Run for specially-abled participants. The marathon continues to grow every year, with a new vision each year, including - "Run for Clean and Safe Drinking Water" (in 2019), "Run for Digital India" (in 2018), "Run for Organ Donation – Live Life Give Life" (in 2017), "Run for Peace" (in 2015), "Run to affect the shift" (in 2014) and "Run for a better tomorrow" (in 2013) respectively. Despite a 2 year hiatus on offline events due to the spread of the COVID-19 pandemic, Techniche – IIT Guwahati, in association with UNICEF Assam, successfully conducted the 12th edition on 24 April 2022. The theme for the year was "Run for Child Protection and Child Abuse prevention", Standup with“ #youth4suraksha”. The event witnessed the participation of over 1500 people from different walks of life to come and spread their cognizance and sense of concern for a better society. Over the years, many prominent personalities have endorsed the event, including the illustrious Milkha Singh, Shimit Amin, and Rakeysh Omprakash Mehra. Their support has been integral in drawing large crowds to the event. Special attendees to the event include singer Zublee Baruah, cricketer Akash Chopra and the world's largest parkour group, "American Parkour". The resumption of the Marathon in 2022 saw Mr. Munna Prasad Gupta, ex-IPS Commissioner among the runners. Coverage of the events are usually provided by Assam Tribune and NDTV India.

== Events ==
=== Spirit Run ===
This is a 6 km run specifically designed for the citizens of Guwahati. The run is open to participants of all ages.

=== Glory Run ===
This is a 21 kilometre half marathon, the first of its kind in North-East India and the flagship event of the day. The race is open to everyone above the age of 14. All participants receive certificates of participation from the Assam Athletic Association.

=== General Championship ===
This event was started in 2014, to inspire young students to hone their athletic skills. The event is exclusive to schools and colleges in and around Guwahati. Participants compete in the Spirit Run, and the institute that garners the most points takes home the General Championship. The points are awarded on the basis of the total number of participants from the institute and the number of participants that end up in the top 50 positions.

=== Creativity Event ===
This event is targeted at all the artists in the crowd who are not athletically inclined. A painting competition is held at the venue, in two separate subgroups - For those below 14 years, and those above 14 years. The best paintings in the competition are awarded.

=== 2023 Edition ===
The 13th edition of the Guwahati Half Marathon was conducted on 9 April 2023. The theme for the year was "Run for Zero Hunger”, in its essence, tried to raise awareness to combat hunger and malnutrition in the region. The theme aligned with the United Nations Sustainable Development Goal 2, which aims to end hunger, achieve food security, and improve nutrition worldwide. The Guwahati Half Marathon 2023 highlighted the urgent need to address the issue of hunger and malnutrition, which affects millions of people in the region. The event will also provide a platform for participants to support the cause and positively impact their communities.

== See also ==
- List of half marathon races
