= Paul Martelletti =

New Zealand long-distance runner

Personal information
- Nationality: New Zealand
- Born: 1 August 1979 (age 47)
- Height: 1.73 m (5 ft 8 in)
- Weight: 65 kg (143 lb)

Sport
- Sport: Long-distance running
- Events: Marathon, Ultramarathon
- Club: Run Fast

Achievements and titles
- Personal bests: 5,000 m – 14:19.50 (2011); 10,000 m – 29:26.18 (2016); HM – 64:18 (2015); 20M – 1:45:17 (2012); Marathon – 2:16:49 (2011); 100K – 7:09:39 (2014)

Paul Martelletti (born 1 August 1979) is a New Zealand marathoner and ultra-marathoner. His notable victories in 2015 included the Greater Manchester Marathon, Bath Half Marathon, Wokingham Half Marathon and Watford Half Marathon. In 2014 Martelletti won the Chelmsford Park Marathon and the Windsor Half Marathon. He also represented Great Britain at the 2014 IAU 100 km World Championships in Doha, Qatar.

In 2016, Martelletti claimed victory at the Brighton Half Marathon for the fourth successive year.

Other Victories

In April 2015, Paul Martelletti ran the quickest ever marathon by someone dressed as a superhero at Sunday's Virgin Money London Marathon.

Initially clocking 2:30:12, Martelletti's time was later adjusted from gun to chip time meaning he managed his target of breaking 2:30 with 2:29:57.

In 2014 he won the UK leg of the inaugural Red Bull Wings for Life race, where he outran a chaser car for 69.37 km to place 5th in the global rankings.

In December 2017 he set the Linford Wood parkrun record, clocking in at 15:13. In May 2019, Martelletti also set the Victoria Dock parkrun course record, in a time of 14:43.
