= Polar Night Halfmarathon =

Annual half marathon running competition in Tromsø, Norway

- Date: early January
- Location: Tromsø, Norway
- Event type: Road running
- Distance: Half Marathon (21.098 km)
- Primary sponsor: SpareBank 1
- Established: 2004
- Course records: Men: 1:08:28 (2021) (Norway) Sebastian Håkansson; Women: 1:18:44 (2021) (Norway) Yngvild Kaspersen
- Website: Polar Night Halfmarathon
- Participants: 256 (2021); 796 (2020)

Polar Night Halfmarathon is an annual half marathon running competition in Tromsø, Norway. It takes place in the beginning of January, during the Polar night-period, when the sun does not rise above the horizon. At almost 70° north, it is the northernmost AIMS-certified (Association of International Marathons and Distance Races) half marathon in the world. It is renowned for its torch-lit route and the chance of running underneath the aurora borealis.

== Past winners ==
Key: Course record Race longer than marathon distance

Edition	Year	Men's winner	Time (h:m:s)	Women's winner	Time (h:m:s)
1st	2004	Juan Rodríguez (ESP)	1:16:00	Manuela Krämer (SWE)	1:41:51
2nd	2005	Egil Skarpsno (NOR)	1:23:08	Trude Giverhaug (NOR)	1:44:34
3rd	2006	Trond-Are Michelsen (NOR)	1:19:12	Ulla Brith Rånes (NOR)	1:48:06
4th	2007	Jens-Kristian Berg (NOR)	1:20:15	Monika Larsen (DEN)	1:37:42
5th	2008	Jens-Kristian Berg (NOR)	1:19:44	Manuela Krämer (SWE)	1:33:44
6th	2009	Jens-Kristian Berg (NOR)	1:21:06	Margaretha Baumann (NOR)	1:26:05
7th	2010	Jens-Kristian Berg (NOR)	1:20:46	Margaretha Baumann (NOR)	1:28:40
8th	2011	Jens-Kristian Berg (NOR)	1:16:19	Helen Palmer (GBR)	1:34:40
9th	2012	Mike Bialick (USA)	1:17:21	Maria Nordfjell (SWE)	1:32:49
10th	2013	Martin Kjäll-Ohlsson (SWE)	1:12:59	Mari Brox (NOR)	1:27:27
11th	2014	Glenn Martinsen (NOR)	1:10:12	Karianne Løkken (NOR)	1:27:52
12th	2015	Alexander Skeltved (NOR)	1:14:25	Hilde Aders (NOR)	1:23:33
13th	2016	Kristian Ulriksen (NOR)	1:13:34	Hilde Aders (NOR)	1:21:50
14th	2017	Kristian Ulriksen (NOR)	1:15:01	Hilde Aders (NOR)	1:23:54
15th	2018	Kristian Ulriksen (NOR)	1:14:24	Hilde Aders (NOR)	1:23:47
16th	2019	Lasse Finstad (NOR)	1:14:24	Hilde Aders (NOR)	1:23:08
17th	2020	Eskil Schøning (DEN)	1:16:25	Lindy-Lee Fölscher (RSA)	1:28:58
18th	2021	Sebastian Håkansson (NOR)	1:08:28	Yngvild Kaspersen (NOR)	1:18:44
