= Stockholm Half Marathon =

- Date: September
- Location: Stockholm, Sweden
- Event type: Road
- Distance: Half marathon
- Primary sponsor: Ramboll
- Established: 1984
- Course records: Men's: 1:03:03 (2023) (United States) Diego Estrada; Women's: 1:11:07 (2011) (Sweden) Isabellah Andersson
- Website: Official website
- Participants: 3,896 finishers (2021); 10,233 (2019)

Stockholm Half Marathon is an annual half marathon arranged in Stockholm, Sweden. It is held in the beginning of September, and so is not connected with Stockholm Marathon directly. Up until 2007 the race was called S:t Eriksloppet (S:t Erik's Race, S:t Erik is the official saint of Stockholm). In order to attract more runners, especially foreign, the name was changed in 2007, however, in 2007 both names were used in parallel. The race has been arranged since 2001, although there was a predecessor called Stockholmsloppet (the Stockholm Race) during the years 1995-2000.

== Results ==
Key: Course record

Year	Men's winner	Time (h:m:s)	Women's winner	Time (h:m:s)
2008	Henrik Skoog (SWE)	1:04:36	Anna Rahm (SWE)	1:13:51
2009	Daniel Woldu (ERI)	1:06:54	Isabellah Andersson (SWE)	1:11:35
2010	Erik Pettersson (SWE)	1:06:07	Isabellah Andersson (SWE)	1:11:52
2011	Adil Bouafif (SWE)	1:04:41	Isabellah Andersson (SWE)	1:11:07
2012	Haben Idris (ERI)	1:05:57	Isabellah Andersson (SWE)	1:14:48
2013	Haben Idris (ERI)	1:06:28	Isabellah Andersson (SWE)	1:11:31
2014	Ababa Lama (ETH)	1:04:47	Lena Eliasson (SWE)	1:15:18
2015	David Nilsson (SWE)	1:10:41	Isabellah Andersson (SWE)	1:17:20
2016	Mustafa Mohamed (SWE)	1:04:51	Roman Mengistu (ETH)	1:16:03
2017	David Nilsson (SWE)	1:06:54	Camilla Richardsson (FIN)	1:15:34
2018	Adhanom Abraha (SWE)	1:04:13	Hanna Lindholm (SWE)	1:15:43
2019	Mustafa Mohamed (SWE)	1:03:44	Johanna Eriksson (SWE)	1:15:51
2021	Olle Walleräng (SWE)	1:06:06	Sara Trané (SWE)	1:20:13
2022	Mohammadreza Abootorabi (SWE)	1:05:41	Hanna Lindholm (SWE)	1:14:26
2023	Diego Estrada (USA)	1:03:03	Lovisa Kissa (UGA)	1:16:33
2024	Ebba Tulu Chala (SWE)	1:04:08	Carolina Wikström (SWE)	1:14:36
