= Windsor Half Marathon =

- Date: September
- Location: Windsor, Berkshire, United Kingdom
- Event type: Road
- Distance: Half Marathon
- Established: 1982

The Windsor Half Marathon is a race that takes place every September at Windsor Great Park, and is run over a distance of 21.0975 kilometres (13.1094 mi).

== Course ==
First Stage

- Double Gates (start)
- Copper Horse (1 Mile)
- Royal Lodge / First Aid / Drinks Station (2 Miles)
- Royal School (3 Miles)
- First Aid / Drinks Station (4.5 Miles)
- Copper Horse (5 Miles)
- Bishops Gate (6 Miles)

Second Stage

- Cumberland Gate (7 Miles)
- First Aid / Drinks Station (9 Miles)
- Sandpit Gate (10.5 Miles)
- First Aid / Drinks Station (11 Miles)
- Copper Horse (12 Miles)
- Double Gates (Finish / 21.0975 kilometres (13.1094 mi))

== Recent Winners ==
Table of recent winners.

| Date | Edition | Time (h:m:s) | Men's winner | Time (h:m:s) | Women's winner |
|---|---|---|---|---|---|
| 29 Sep 2019 | 37th | 1:07:47 | Daniel Studley | 1:16:52 | Charlotte Taylor-Green |
| 30 Sep 2018 | 36th | 1:07:53 | Daniel Jarvis | 1:17:11 | Louise Small |
| 24 Sep 2017 | 35th | 1:09:49 | Daniel Jarvis | 1:20:22 | Georgie Bruinvels |
| 25 Sep 2016 | 34th | 1:07:06 | Kojo Kyereme | 1:17:49 | Lily Partridge |
| 27 Sep 2015 | 33rd | 1:07:50 | Kojo Kyereme | 1:22:27 | Samantha Amend |
| 28 Sep 2014 | 32nd | 1:08:45 | Paul Martelletti | 1:22:00 | Samantha Amend |
| 29 Sep 2013 | 31st | 1:09:37 | Kojo Kyereme | 1:19:33 | Lesley Locks |
| 07 Oct 2012 | 30th | 1:13:29 | Alexander Miller | 1:19:50 | Holly Rush |
| 25 Sep 2011 | 29th | 1:10:05 | Tomas Abyu | 1:17:38 | Lucy MacAlister |
| 26 Sep 2010 | 28th | 1:08:14 | Scott Overall | 1:17:51 | Holly Rush |
| 27 Sep 2009 | 27th | 1:06:10 | Scott Overall | 1:18:05 | Susie Bush |
| 28 Sep 2008 | 26th | 1:09:33 | Kassa Tadesse | 1:16:16 | Lucy MacAlister |
| 30 Sep 2007 | Cancelled due to Foot-and-mouth disease | | | | |
| 24 Sep 2006 | 25th | 1:06:27 | Tomas Abyu | 1:15:10 | Birhan Dagne |
| 25 Sep 2005 | 24th | 1:06:52 | Joseph Kibor | 1:16:06 | Joyce Kandie |
| 26 Sep 2004 | 23rd | 1:04:06.5 | Ernest Kimeli | 1:18:16.7 | Lucy MacAlister |
| 28 Sep 2003 | 22nd | 1:02:43 | Simon Kasimili | 1:30:28 | Pippa Knight |
| 29 Sep 2002 | 21st | 1:04:12 | Julius Kimtai | 1:14:06 | Emily Samoei |
| 30 Sep 2001 | 20th | 1:07:50 | Peter Edukan | 1:18:37 | Miriam Wangari |
| 01 Oct 2000 | 19th | 1:07:34 | Hilary Lelei | 1:20:25 | Emily Chepkosgei |
| 03 Oct 1999 | 18th | 1:09:03 | Vincent Garner | 1:21:14 | Lesley Whiley |
| 04 Oct 1998 | 17th | 1:08:48 | Gary Bishop | 1:21:11 | Helen Cawthorne |
| 05 Oct 1997 | 16th | 1:09:23 | Martin Kearns | 1:21:35 | Clare Pauzers |
