= Michelle Ross-Cope =

English long-distance runner

Personal information
- Born: 31 January 1972 (age 53)
- Website: www.rosscoperunning.co.uk

Sport
- Event(s): Marathon, Half marathon
- Club: City of Stoke

Michelle Ross-Cope (born 31 January 1972) is an English long-distance runner. She competed for Britain at the European Athletics Championships and several IAAF World Half Marathon Championships. She also represented England at the 2010 Commonwealth Games. She has also won several British domestic road races.

Ross-Cope began running competitive half marathon races in 2006. By 2007 she was representing Britain in the IAAF World Road Running Championships which she did for three successive years. The third of these was the most successful as she finished 33rd and the British women's team, of Ross-Cope with Claire Hallissey and Gemma Miles finished in 7th place despite the absence of Paula Radcliffe.

In 2009 a 2:36:02 finish in the London Marathon was just outside the required 2:34:00 qualifying time for 2009 World Championships in Athletics. However her best year was yet to come, and in 2010 she was selected for the European Athletics Championships and finished 12th, the first Briton ahead of compatriot Susan Partridge. Then at the 2010 Commonwealth Games she finished in 6th position, again the first Briton ahead of Helen Decker and Holly Rush.

== Competition Record ==
Year	Competition	Venue	Position	Event	Notes
Representing Great Britain and England
2006	Great North Run	Newcastle-upon-Tyne, U.K.	14th	Half marathon	1:14:52
2007	IAAF World Road Running Championships	Udine, Italy	40th	Half marathon	1:13:45
2008	IAAF World Road Running Championships	Rio de Janeiro, Brazil	47th	Half marathon	1:20:43
2009	London Marathon	London, U.K.		Marathon	2:36:02 (PB)
2009	IAAF World Half Marathon Championships	Birmingham, U.K.	33rd	Half marathon	1:13:50
2009	New York Marathon	New York City, U.S.A		Marathon	2:49:48
2010	Four Villages Half Marathon	Helsby, U.K.	1st	Half Marathon	1:15:02
2010	Bath Half Marathon	Bath, U.K.	1st	Half Marathon	1:12:07
2010	European Athletics Championships	Barcelona, Spain	12th	Marathon	2:38:45
2010	Commonwealth Games	Delhi, India	6th	Marathon	2:46:13
2011	Four Villages Half Marathon	Helsby, U.K.	1st	Half Marathon	1:14:31
