= Kyiv Interbank Offer Rate =

Reference rate of Ukraine

Kyiv Interbank Offer Rate (KIBOR; Ukrainian: Київська міжба́нківська ста́вка пропози́ції) is a daily indicative rate based on the interest rates at which banks offer to lend unsecured funds to other banks on the Ukrainian money market (or interbank market). KIBOR is the opposite of the Kyiv Interbank Bid Rate (KIBID).

KIBOR is currently calculated for such currencies as: Ukrainian Hryvnia (UAH) and US Dollar (USD).
