= Meriem Wangari =

Kenyan long-distance runner (born 1979)

Meriem Wangarì Kiprugut (born 22 February 1979) is a Kenyan long-distance runner who specialises in half marathon and 10K road races. Her personal best for the half marathon distance is 1:10:27 hours, set in Lille in 2007. She made her marathon debut in 2012 and set a time of 2:31:30 hours on her first attempt.

She has competed in mainly British and French competitions. She has won half marathons in Bristol, Bath, Lille, Boulogne-Billancourt, as well as Gothenburg and Marrakech. She is a three-time winner of the 20 Kilomètres de Paris, a four-time winner of the 20 kilomètres de Maroilles, and has had five victories at the Foulée Suresnoise.

== Career ==
Wangarì won her first races while based in the United Kingdom. She won the Swansea Bay 10K in 2001, then took the women's title at the Windsor Half Marathon a week later. She returned to the Swansea race the following year and took a second straight victory. She had consecutive wins at both the Cardiff 10K and the Bristol Half Marathon in 2003 and 2004. A personal best run of 1:11:58 hours came at the Bath Half Marathon in March 2003 and she was narrowly beaten by a second by race winner Deborah Robinson. She won the Göteborgsvarvet in Sweden in May, returned to the UK to win the Stroud Half Marathon in October, then went on to reach the top of the podium at her second attempt at the 2004 Bath Half Marathon. Her fastest run of 2004 came at the Glasgow Half Marathon, where she completed the distance in 1:12:00 hours to take second place behind Beatrice Omwanza.

Wangarì moved to France for the 2005 season and completed extensively on the country's road race circuit that year. Among her outings were victories at the 20 kilomètres de Maroilles, Semi-Marathon d'Oloron Sainte Marie, La Rochelle Half Marathon, Alençon-Médavy 15K, and the Foulée Suresnoise 10K. Another win came at the Boulogne-Billancourt Half Marathon in what was then a course record time of 1:12:00 hours. She improved her personal best time to 1:11:54 hours at that year's Reims à Toutes Jambes half marathon.

The highlight of her 2006 season was a win at the Lille Half Marathon in a personal best of 1:11:36 hours. She retained her titles at the Maroilles 20K and Oloron Sainte Marie races and also ran a 10K personal best of 32:47 minutes at the Istanbul 10K, finishing second to Elvan Abeylegesse. Her 15K time also fell that year, as she took the women's race at the Corrida Festas da Cidade do Porto in a time of 48:51 minutes. Her 2007 began she won a third straight win in Maroilles. She knocked a second off her best at the Lille Half Marathon, recording 1:10:27 hours and being beaten by Mary Keitany. In September she won the Le Lion Half Marathon and the Paris-Versailles Race within the space of a week. The following month she won the 20 Kilomètres de Paris and came third at the Istanbul 15K.

In April 2008 she ran the half marathon at the Humarathon in Vitry-sur-Seine and was third in an all-Kenyan sweep of the podium. A fourth straight win in Maroilles was also her fastest, as she completed the distance in 1:08:49 hours (the second fastest in the race history). Further to this, she also achieved consecutive wins at both the Course Paris-Versailles and Paris 20K, as well as winning the Foulée Suresnoise. She repeated her victories again at these three races in 2009 and at the Paris 20K set a career best of 1:05:30 hours. She came close to a personal best with a run of 1:10:28 hours for fourth at the Humarathon. At the Corrida de Langueux she defeated all comers and was five seconds off the course record. That year, she also reached the podium at the Lille and Boulogne-Billancourt half marathons.

The 2010 season saw Wangarì retain her titles at the Corrida Langueux, Foulée Suresnoise and Paris-Versailles races. Over the half marathon, she was fifth at the Paris Half Marathon and ran a season's best of 1:12:19 hours to win at the Marrakech Half Marathon. She continued her winning streaks at the Corrida Langueux and Foulée Suresnoise into 2011. Her fastest run that year was 1:11:10 hours, which brought her the title at the Saint Denis Half Marathon. She made her debut over the marathon distance at the 2012 Xiamen Marathon in China and although she was some minutes behind the winner Ashu Kasim, she claimed second place with a debut time of 2:31:30 hours.
