= Bath Half Marathon =

Road running race in the United Kingdom

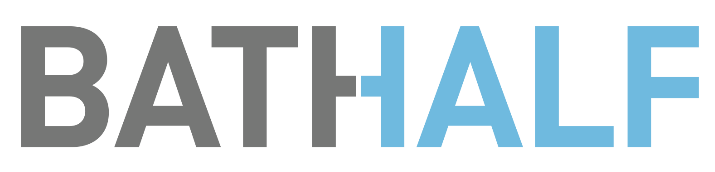
- Date: March
- Location: Bath, United Kingdom
- Event type: Road
- Distance: Half marathon
- Primary sponsor: Danone GetPro
- Established: 1981; 45 years ago
- Course records: Men's: 1:01:45 (2016); Robert Wambua Mbithi; Women's: 1:09:15 (2026); Alexandra Bell
- Website: bathhalf.co.uk

The Bath Half Marathon (stylised as BATHALF) is an annual road running half marathon held in Bath, England, normally on the second or third Sunday in March. It has been held almost every year since 1982. The race was first run in the year after the first London Marathon and has remained a popular race for runners preparing for that event. The next race is scheduled for Sunday 14 March 2027.

It is the largest one-day charity fundraising event in South West England, raising over £2.2 million for charity in 2016.

== Course ==
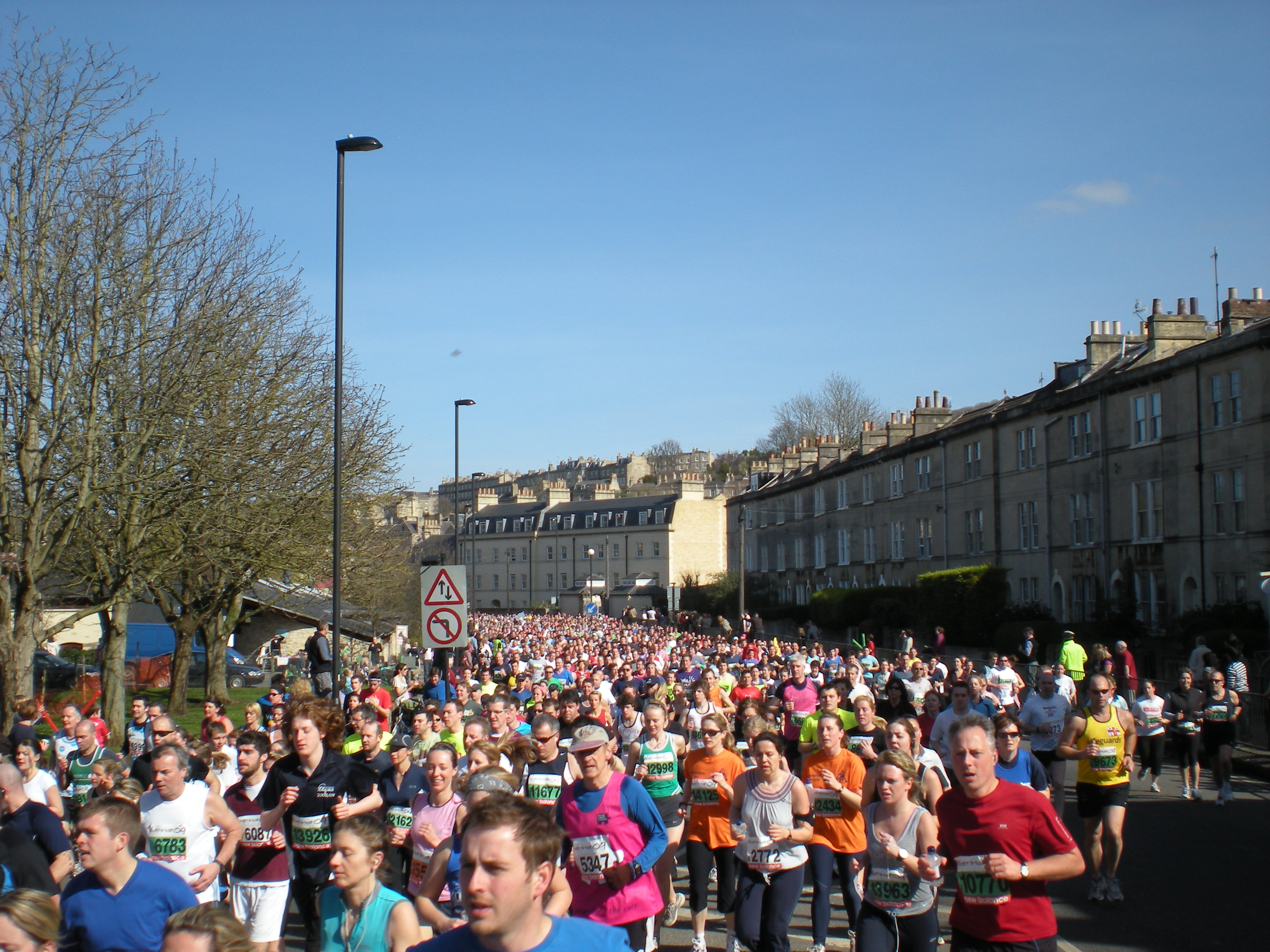
Main group of runners in 2009, on Pulteney Road, Widcombe

The Bath Half is generally considered to be a fast flat course, straddling both sides of the River Avon. The race starts and finishes at Royal Victoria Park.

The route follows two laps from the park, first heading westbound out of the city centre along the A4 road (Upper Bristol Road and Newbridge Road) to Newbridge and crossing New Bridge at the Twerton Fork at the beginning of the dual carriageway. From here the race heads eastbound on the A36 back towards the city centre, along Lower Bristol Road, past Churchill Bridge, then continues up Rossiter Road and Pulteney Road South, before going into Great Pulteney Street, U-turning at the former start and finish location and heading back down to Churchill Bridge via the same route to complete the out-and-back section.

The route then crosses the River Avon via the Churchill Bridge, heads past the city centre and Green Park via the A367, before cutting through Monmouth Place to re-join Upper Bristol Road and begin the second lap.

The second lap follows largely the same route as the first, however, the out-and-back section is not included for a second time, and the route makes a direct left turn at the Churchill Bridge instead.

At the Monmouth Place, the route breaks-off from the main loop and continues straight-on up Chapel Row, Queen Square and Queen's Parade as the incline begins to steepen. The route then heads up the only significant hill in the course: the final climb up Royal Avenue back into the park. The incline flattens-out for the final 200 metres of the route where it finishes in front of the famous Royal Crescent.

== History ==
The course used largely the same route from 2006 to 2020, starting and finishing on Great Pulteney Street with Bath Recreation Ground as the race headquarters.

Major changes to the race were made in 2022. The race relocated to Royal Victoria Park, starting at nearby Queen Square and finishing in the park, next to the new race village. The new course followed largely the same roads but in reverse order. The out-and-back section along Great Pulteney Street was introduced, with the direction of the main loop being reversed; the route ran westbound along Lower Bristol Road and eastbound along Newbridge Road and Upper Bristol Road, finishing with a sharp incline up Marlborough Lane.

In 2023, the course was revised again: the start and finish were both moved to the park's Royal Avenue, and the main loop was switched back to its original direction. Another tweak to the start was implemented in 2025, with it moving to the other side of Marlborough Lane. The finish remained unchanged.

=== Effects of the COVID-19 pandemic ===
The 2020 event faced criticism after it went ahead on despite the threat of the COVID-19 pandemic rapidly increasing; the UK went into lockdown nine days after the race took place.

A number of organisations pulled out, and local MP Wera Hobhouse called for it to be cancelled, saying "protecting the most vulnerable in our city from a further spread of the infection must be the priority." Organisers denied accusations they were irresponsible, and the event took place with half the usual number of participants. Bath MP Wera Hobhouse later said lives probably would have been saved had the event been cancelled, but the "organiser had no guidance from Government to stop the event." Bath Half race director said "We are not aware of any data or evidence linking outdoor participation events such as the Bath Half with the spread of COVID-19, or with any fatalities from COVID-19 ... In the absence of any such data this type of discussion could be regarded as speculation, even scaremongering."

The 2021 event was first postponed to September, and then cancelled in April 2021 owing to uncertainty surrounding COVID-19 restrictions, combined with planned road closures for improvement works.

=== Post-COVID-19 pandemic ===
The 2022 event was originally scheduled for 13 March, but the race was subsequently pushed back to 29 May due to "pressure on the highways" while extensive roadworks were ongoing in the city. The race was then postponed for a third time, being moved to 16 October.

The 2023 event remained at the autumn date, taking place on 15 October, and in 2024 the race returned to its traditional March date for the first time since the pandemic.

== Results ==
Year	Date	Competitors	Athlete	Nationality	Time (h:m:s)	Athlete	Nationality	Time (h:m:s)
2026	15 March	12,632	Joe Wigfield	United Kingdom	1:02:07	Alex Bell	United Kingdom	1:09:15
2025	16 March	11,134	Jake Smith	United Kingdom	1:02:20	Abbie Donnelly	United Kingdom	1:09:54
2024	17 March	8,421	Omar Ahmed	Ethiopia	1:04:42	Becky Briggs	United Kingdom	1:14:24
2023	15 October	9,240	Jonathan Escalante-Phillips	United Kingdom	1:04:25	Phillipa Williams	United Kingdom	1:13:05
2022	16 October	6,857	Kadar Omar	Ethiopia	1:05:04	Atsede Gidey	United Kingdom	1:11:54
2021	Cancelled due to COVID-19 & highways restrictions							
2020	15 March	6,827	Paul Pollock	Ireland	1:04:14	Becky Briggs	United Kingdom	1:14:34
2019	17 March	11,348	Chris Thompson	United Kingdom	1:03:09	Kate Reed	United Kingdom	1:12:44
2018	4 March	Cancelled due to snow						
2017	12 March	12,748	Ben Fish	United Kingdom	1:05:16	Ruth Barnes	United Kingdom	1:15:32
2016	13 March	11,352	Robert Mbithi	Kenya	1:01:45	Lenah Jerotich	Kenya	1:12:24
2015	1 March	11,693	Paul Martelletti	United Kingdom	1:05:27	Emma Stepto	United Kingdom	1:13:48
2014	2 March	11,208	Nicholas Kirui	Kenya	1:03:13	Perendis Lekapana	Kenya	1:10:53
2013	3 March	11,062	Tewodros Shiferaw	Ethiopia	1:03:26	Polline Wanjiru	Kenya	1:10:28
2012	11 March	10,695	Edwin Kiptoo	Kenya	1:02:01	Jane Muia	Kenya	1:11:19
2011	6 March	10,848	Edwin Kipkorir	Kenya	1:04:00	Edith Chelimo	Kenya	1:11:25
2010	7 March	5,293	Ezekiel Cherop	Kenya	1:03:03	Michelle Ross-Cope	United Kingdom	1:12:07
2009	15 March	10,690	Simon Tonui	Kenya	1:03:09	Joyce Kandia	Kenya	1:11:49
2008	16 March	10,054	Raymond Tonui	Kenya	1:05:21	Roman Gebresse	Kenya	1:13:09
2007	25 March	8,165	Tewodros Shiferaw	Ethiopia	1:02:09	Liz Yelling	United Kingdom	1:09:27
2006	19 March	5,993	Simon Kasimili	Kenya	1:04:08	Cathy Mutwa	Kenya	1:12:43
2005	20 March	5,898	Simon Tonui	Kenya	1:02:53	Susan Partridge	United Kingdom	1:13:10
2004	14 March	3,767	Joseph Riri	Kenya	1:02:20	Miriam Wangari	Kenya	1:14:37
2003	16 March	3,582	Huw Lobb	United Kingdom	1:04:51	Debbie Robinson	United Kingdom	1:11:57
2002	10 March	3,486	William Musyoki	Kenya	1:04:14	Jo Lodge	United Kingdom	1:14:01
2001	11 March	3,091	Paul Green	United Kingdom	1:04:57	Annie Emmerson	United Kingdom	1:11:13
2000	12 March	2,831	Alan Sheppard	United Kingdom	1:05:48	Helen Purdy	United Kingdom	1:15:55
1999	21 March	Unknown	Tony Graham	United Kingdom	1:06:58	Debbie Gunning	United Kingdom	1:18:36
1998	8 March	Unknown	Stuart Hall	United Kingdom	1:06:52	Melanie Ellis	United Kingdom	1:15:34
1997	16 March	Unknown	Gareth Davies	United Kingdom	1:06:55	Hayley Nash	United Kingdom	1:18:37
1996	17 March	Unknown	Phil Makepeace	United Kingdom	1:05:15	Hayley Nash	United Kingdom	1:16:10
1995	19 March	Unknown	David Taylor	United Kingdom	1:04:22	Karen MacLeod	United Kingdom	1:14:17
1994	20 March	2,321	Chris Buckley	United Kingdom	1:03:44	Hayley Nash	United Kingdom	1:13:15
1993	14 March	Unknown	Steve Brace	United Kingdom	1:04:05	Andrea Wallace	United Kingdom	1:09:39
1992	15 March	Unknown	Colin Walker	United Kingdom	1:03:59	Ann Roden	United Kingdom	1:15:26
1991	17 March	Unknown	Chris Buckley	United Kingdom	1:04:41	Karen MacLeod	United Kingdom	1:13:31
1990	18 March	Unknown	Steve Brace	United Kingdom	1:05:11	Veronique Marot	United Kingdom	1:13:46
1989	19 March	Unknown	John Wheway	United Kingdom	1:04:26	Bronwen Cardy-Wise	United Kingdom	1:15:20
1988	20 March	Unknown	John Wheway	United Kingdom	1:04:11	Sally Ellis	United Kingdom	1:11:38
1987	15 March	Unknown	John Wheway	United Kingdom	1:03:02	Veronique Marot	United Kingdom	1:11:53
1986	16 March	Unknown	Steve Anders	United Kingdom	1:02:35	Veronique Marot	United Kingdom	1:10:23
1985	17 March	Unknown	Steve Anders	United Kingdom	1:03:29	Veronique Marot	United Kingdom	1:11:10
1984	18 March	Unknown	Maurice Cowman	United Kingdom	1:04:13	Priscilla Welch	United Kingdom	1:12:13
1983	20 March	Unknown	Nigel Gates	United Kingdom	1:04:24	Annette Roberts	United Kingdom	1:15:35
1982	21 March	Unknown	Nigel Gates	United Kingdom	1:03:01	Joyce Smith	United Kingdom	1:11:45

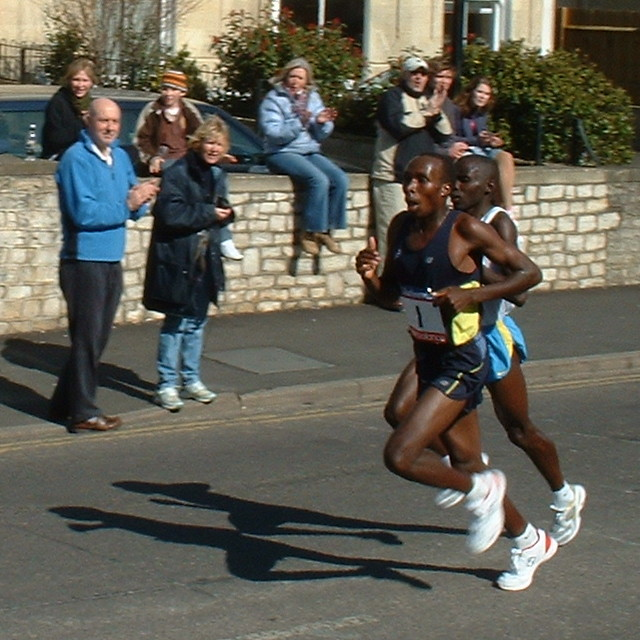
Leading runners in 2006, Simon Tonui and Simon Kasimili
