= Hackney Half =

Annual half-marathon held in London, England

- Date: May
- Location: London, United Kingdom
- Event type: Road
- Distance: Half marathon
- Primary sponsor: Hoka
- Established: 2014
- Website: www.hackneymoves.com

The Hackney Half is an annual half-marathon held during the spring in the London borough of Hackney. The first event was held in 2014, with over 12,000 runners taking part. The event is London's biggest half-marathon event, with 24,000 runners taking part in the 2023 event.

In 2020, the event was cancelled due to the COVID-19 pandemic. In 2021, the event originally set to happen in May, was postponed to September 26th with a scaled back event due to the COVID-19 lockdown in the United Kingdom.

In 2023, organisers of the event were accused of “greenwashing” by Green Party councillor Alastair Binnie-Lubbock, after the airline Wizz Air sponsored the event. General entries for the 2025 event sold out in a record time of two weeks. The event's popularity has grown, with general entries for the 2026 race selling out in two days.

== Course ==
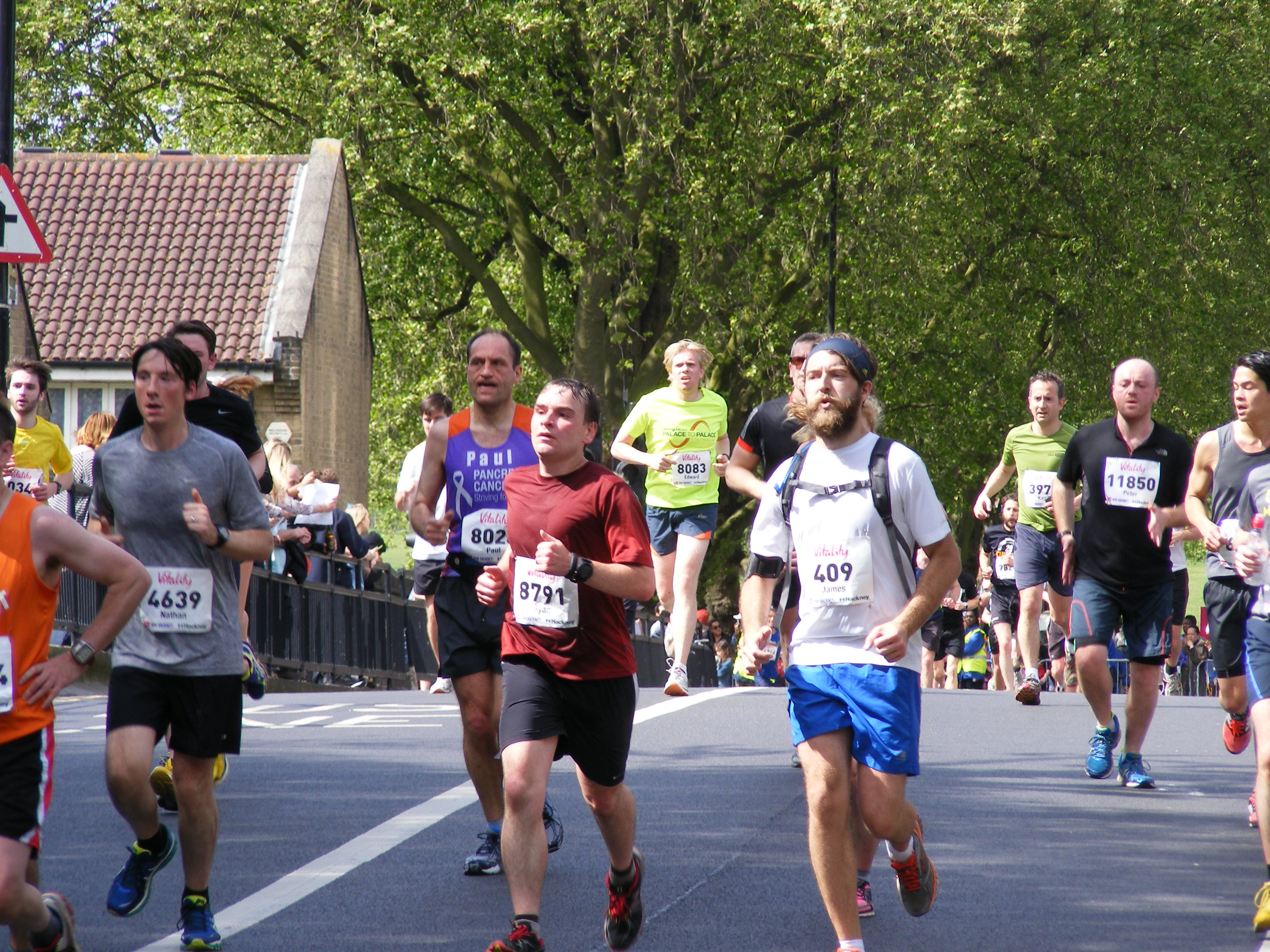
Runners at the Hackney Half 2015 event

The closed road race has a flat course that starts and finishes in Hackney Marshes, taking in Hackney Downs, Hackney Central past the Hackney Empire, Broadway Market, and Hackney Wick.

== Records ==
=== Editions ===
Edition	Date	Men's winner	Time	Women's winner	Time
1	22 June 2014	Peter Emase	1:04:19	Gladys Yator	1:15:30
2	10 May 2015	Mathew Kimutai	1:03:21	Katy Webster	1:17:38
3	8 May 2016	Mark Kibiwott	1:04:38	Hannah Walker	1:18:12
4	30 April 2017	Paul Whittaker	1:06:55	Isabel Clark	1:18:10
5	22 May 2018	Joe Morwood	1:08:50	Stephanie Davis	1:16:41
6	19 May 2019	Jonathan Cornish	1:06:58	Emily Stewart	1:19:45
7	26 September 2021	Jonathan Cornish	1:06:36	Laura Kaye	1:19:12
8	22 May 2022	Sam Bramwell	1:09:17	Rebecca Bunting	1:19:13
9	21 May 2023	Sam Bramwell	1:07.56	Kirsty Fraser	1:17.16
10	19 May 2024	Fredrick Hessian	1:08:05	Yvie Lock	1:15:25
11	18 May 2025	Hugo Fry and Chris Bruchhausen	1:06:53	Becky Briggs	1:14:20
12	17 May 2026	Sam Tyas	1:06:35	Ciara Boyd-Squires Long	1:14:54
