= Paul Pollock =

Irish long-distance runner

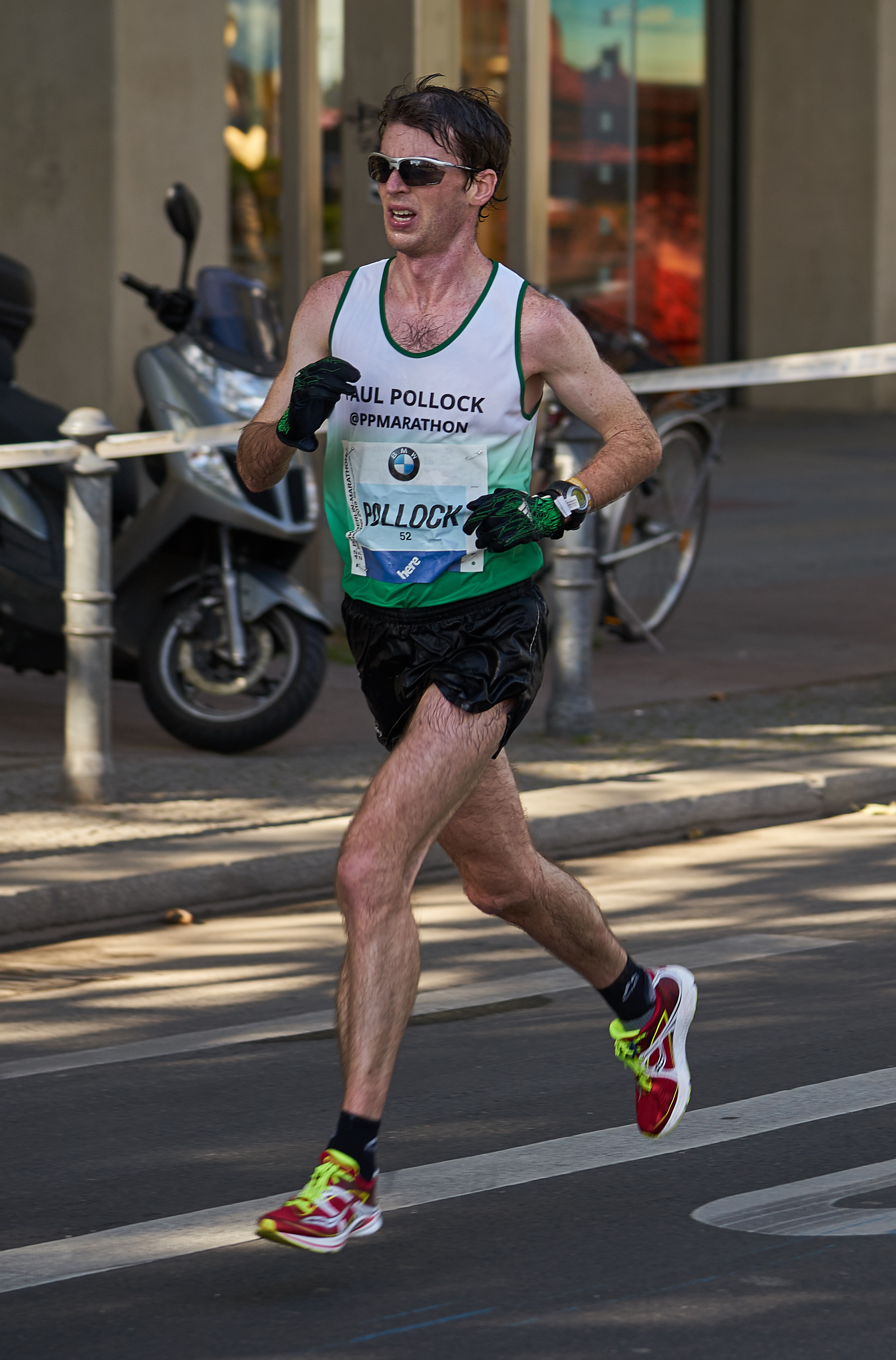
- Pollock, Berlin Marathon 2015

Personal information
- Born: June 25, 1986 (age 40) Belfast, Northern Ireland
- Height: 5 ft 10 in (1.77 m)
- Weight: 9 st 6 lb (132 lb 60 kg)

Sport
- Country: Ireland
- Sport: Athletics
- Event: Marathon

Paul Pollock (born 25 June 1986) is an Irish Marathon runner from Holywood, Northern Ireland. He competed at the Rio 2016 Summer Olympics, finishing the marathon in 32nd position, in a time of 2.16.24. He was the first Irishman home, followed by his teammates Kevin Seaward and Mick Clohisey. His time was the third-fastest by an Irish runner at an Olympic game. He also competed in the men's marathon at the 2020 Summer Olympics held in Tokyo, Japan.

He first competed in a major championship in 2004 when representing Northern Ireland at the Commonwealth Youth Games in Bendigo, Australia. He finished 4th in the 1500 m. By 2017, he had 15 Irish caps, as well as having represented Northern Ireland on numerous occasions. He has competed on the world stage at each of the major global championships – Commonwealth Games, World Championships, European Championships, and Olympic Games.

In 2018, Pollock qualified to run in the Commonwealth Games marathon, but was forced to withdraw due to injury during training in Australia.

Following his participation in the 2013 World Athletics Championships, he continues to write a monthly blog detailing his races and training. Having originally been a member of Abbey AC (Newtonabbey, Northern Ireland), he now represents both Annadale Striders (Belfast) and Kent AC (England). He continues to train, coach, and compete, alongside working part-time as an Emergency Medicine doctor.

== Championships Record ==
Year	Competition	Venue	Position	Event	Notes
2004	Commonwealth Youth Games	Bendigo, Australia	4th	1500m	
2005	European XC Championships	Tilburg, Holland	46th	XC (Junior)	
2008	European XC Championships	Brussels, Belgium	57th	XC (U23)	
2011	European XC Championships	Velenje, Slovenia	25th	XC	
2012	World Half Marathon	Kavarna, Bulgaria	34th	Half marathon	
2013	World Outdoor Championships	Moscow, Russia	21st	Marathon	
2013	European XC Championships	Belgrade, Serbia	26th	XC	
2014	European Outdoor Championships	Zurich, Switzerland	DNS	Marathon	
2014	World Half Marathon	Copenhagen, Denmark	30th	Half marathon	
2014	Commonwealth Games	Glasgow, Scotland	16th	10000m	
2014	European XC Championships	Samokov, Bulgaria	23rd	XC	
2015	European Indoor Championships	Prague, Czech Republic	Heats	3000m	
2015	European XC Championships	Hyeres, France	45th	XC	
2016	Olympic Games	Rio, Brazil	32nd	Marathon	
2016	European Outdoor Championships	Amsterdam, Holland	17th	Half marathon	
2016	World Half Marathon	Cardiff, Wales	14th	Half Marathon	
2016	European XC Championships	Chia, Sardinia	36th	XC	
2017	World Half Marathon	Gifu, Japan	42nd	Half marathon	
2017	World Marathon	Beppu-Ōita, Japan	18th	Marathon	
2018	World Half Marathon	Barcelona, Spain	28th	Half marathon	
2018	IAAF World Half Marathon Championships	Valencia, Spain	77th	Half marathon	
2018	Commonwealth Games	Gold Coast, Australia	DNS	Marathon	
