= 2005 IAAF World Half Marathon Championships =

- Organisers: IAAF
- Edition: 14th
- Date: October 1
- Host city: Edmonton, Alberta, Canada
- Events: 2
- Participation: 156 athletes from 43 nations

The 14th IAAF World Half Marathon Championships were held in Edmonton, Canada on 1 October 2005. The competition was replaced by the World Road Running Championships in 2006 and 2007, but revived as IAAF World Half Marathon Championships in 2008.

A total of 156 athletes, 87 men and 69 women, from 43 countries took part. The four and a half lap course begins and ends in Hawrelak Park. Detailed reports on the event and an appraisal of the results were given both for the men's race and for the women's race.

Complete results were published for the men's race, for the women's race, for men's team, and for women's team.

== Medallists ==
Event	Gold		Silver		Bronze	
Individual
Men	Fabiano Joseph (TAN)	1:01:08	Mubarak Hassan Shami (QAT)	1:01:09	Yonas Kifle (ERI)	1:01:13
Women	Constantina Diţă-Tomescu (ROU)	1:09:17	Lornah Kiplagat (NED)	1:10:19	Susan Chepkemei (KEN)	1:10:20
Team
Team Men	Ethiopia	3:06:18	Eritrea	3:07:05	Japan	3:08:30
Team Women	Romania	3:31:00	Russia	3:33:05	Japan	3:35:42

== Race results ==
=== Men's ===
Rank	Athlete	Nationality	Time	Notes
1st place, gold medalist(s)	Fabiano Joseph	Tanzania	1:01:08	
2nd place, silver medalist(s)	Mubarak Hassan Shami	Qatar	1:01:09	NR
3rd place, bronze medalist(s)	Yonas Kifle	Eritrea	1:01:13	
4	Sileshi Sihine	Ethiopia	1:01:14	
5	Abebe Dinkessa	Ethiopia	1:01:53	PB
6	John Yuda	Tanzania	1:02:11	
7	James Mwangi Macharia	Kenya	1:02:25	
8	Kazuo Ietani	Japan	1:02:26	
9	Yared Asmeron	Eritrea	1:02:44	
10	Norman Dlomo	South Africa	1:02:45	
11	Takayuki Matsumiya	Japan	1:02:45	
12	Tesfayohannes Mesfen	Eritrea	1:03:08	PB
13	Lishan Yegezu	Ethiopia	1:03:11	
14	Wilson Busienei	Uganda	1:03:12	
15	Ryan Shay	United States	1:03:13	
16	Paul Kimaiyo	Kenya	1:03:17	
17	Takanobu Otsubo	Japan	1:03:19	
18	Solomon Tsige	Ethiopia	1:03:23	
19	Sultan Khamis Zaman	Qatar	1:03:31	
20	Jason Hartmann	United States	1:03:32	
21	Julius Kibet	Kenya	1:03:50	
22	Antonio Peña	Spain	1:03:52	
23	Ahmed Jumaa Jaber	Qatar	1:04:06	PB
24	Yoshihiro Yamamoto	Japan	1:04:15	
25	Gilbert Okari	Kenya	1:04:17	
26	Ayele Setegne	Israel	1:04:21	
27	Sylvester Moleko	South Africa	1:04:33	
28	Keenetse Moswasi	Botswana	1:04:42	
29	Julio César Pérez	Mexico	1:04:49	PB
30	Matt Downin	United States	1:04:53	
31	Jeffrey Gwebu	South Africa	1:04:57	
32	Fabio Mascheroni	Italy	1:04:57	
33	Jason Lehmkuhle	United States	1:04:58	
34	Odilón Cuahutle	Mexico	1:04:59	
35	Brett Cartwright	Australia	1:05:10	
36	José Souza	Brazil	1:05:24	PB
37	Fernando Rey	Spain	1:05:28	
38	Javier Cortés	Spain	1:05:36	
39	Kaelo Mosalagae	Botswana	1:05:58	PB
40	Nicholas Kemboi	Qatar	1:06:04	
41	Toshihiro Iwasa	Japan	1:06:14	
42	Luis Collazo	Puerto Rico	1:06:15	
43	José Eloy	Brazil	1:06:17	
44	Jeremy Deere	Canada	1:06:19	SB
45	Raúl Mora	Chile	1:06:20	
46	Carlos Jaramillo	Chile	1:06:22	
47	Matthew McInnes	Canada	1:06:28	SB
48	César Lam	Puerto Rico	1:06:30	
49	Mike Morgan	United States	1:06:46	
50	Ndabili Bashingili	Botswana	1:06:47	
51	Nicolas Kiprono	Uganda	1:06:59	
52	Andrew Smith	Canada	1:07:23	
53	Asaf Bimro	Israel	1:07:46	
54	Anuradha Cooray	Sri Lanka	1:08:02	
55	Miguel Ángel Gamonal	Spain	1:08:09	
56	Bat-Ochir Ser-Od	Mongolia	1:08:12	NR
57	James Kibet	Uganda	1:08:36	
58	Leonidas Rivadeneira	Chile	1:08:52	
59	Egide Manirakiza	Burundi	1:09:19	
60	Róbert Štefko	Czech Republic	1:09:32	
61	Mukat Derbe	Israel	1:09:36	
62	Kabo Gabaseme	Botswana	1:09:56	
63	Coolboy Ngamole	South Africa	1:10:00	
64	Ernest Ndjissipou	Central African Republic	1:10:01	
65	Linos Chintali	Zambia	1:10:11	
66	Mark Bomba	Canada	1:10:39	
67	Wodage Zvadya	Israel	1:11:09	
68	Ryan Day	Canada	1:11:20	
69	Frederic Burquier	French Polynesia	1:11:30	PB
70	Rupert Green	Jamaica	1:12:59	NR
71	Gregory McKenzie	Jamaica	1:13:27	PB
72	Marcel Tschopp	Liechtenstein	1:13:57	
73	Curtis Cox	Trinidad and Tobago	1:14:52	
74	Samson Kiflemariam	Eritrea	1:14:56	
75	Andrew Gutzmore	Jamaica	1:14:56	PB
76	Fouly Salem	Egypt	1:15:03	
77	Richard Jones	Trinidad and Tobago	1:17:30	
78	Kun Sio Pan	Macau	1:17:42	
79	Lindson Lynch	Dominica	1:18:09	
80	Kani Simons	South Africa	1:19:32	
81	Michael Alexander	Trinidad and Tobago	1:24:07	
—	Elson Gracioli	Brazil	DNF	
—	Jean-Paul Niyonsaba	Burundi	DNF	
—	Eric Quiros	Costa Rica	DNF	
—	El Hassan Lahssini	France	DNF	
—	Ali Al-Dawoodi	Qatar	DNF	
—	Alex Malinga	Uganda	DNF	
—	Roath Ban	Cambodia	DNS	
—	Abebe Mekonnen	Ethiopia	DNS	
—	Osama S. Mabrouk	Palestine	DNS	

=== Women's ===
Rank	Athlete	Nationality	Time	Notes
1st place, gold medalist(s)	Constantina Diţă-Tomescu	Romania	1:09:17	SB
2nd place, silver medalist(s)	Lornah Kiplagat	Netherlands	1:10:19	SB
3rd place, bronze medalist(s)	Susan Chepkemei	Kenya	1:10:20	
4	Galina Bogomolova	Russia	1:10:34	PB
5	Mihaela Botezan	Romania	1:10:36	SB
6	Madaí Pérez	Mexico	1:10:37	PB
7	Lidiya Grigoryeva	Russia	1:11:01	SB
8	Nuța Olaru	Romania	1:11:07	
9	Merima Hashim	Ethiopia	1:11:09	PB
10	Adriana Pirtea	Romania	1:11:10	
11	Irina Timofeyeva	Russia	1:11:30	
12	Terumi Asoshina	Japan	1:11:45	
13	Hiromi Ominami	Japan	1:11:57	
14	Yoko Yagi	Japan	1:12:00	
15	Derartu Tulu	Ethiopia	1:12:12	
16	Caroline Kilel	Kenya	1:12:13	SB
17	Akane Taira	Japan	1:12:23	
18	Mara Yamauchi	Great Britain	1:12:40	
19	Letay Nagash	Ethiopia	1:12:43	
20	Nina Rillstone	New Zealand	1:13:03	
21	Lioudmila Kortchaguina	Canada	1:13:15	
22	Sisay Measo	Ethiopia	1:13:35	PB
23	Deborah Toniolo	Italy	1:13:36	
24	Hayley Haining	Great Britain	1:13:39	
25	Susan Partridge	Great Britain	1:13:49	
26	Živilė Balčiūnaitė	Lithuania	1:13:54	
27	Luminița Talpoș	Romania	1:14:01	
28	Nicole Stevenson	Canada	1:14:26	
29	Anastasiya Padalinskaya	Belarus	1:14:26	PB
30	Alina Ivanova	Russia	1:14:27	
31	Vincenza Sicari	Italy	1:14:33	
32	Lauren Shelley	Australia	1:14:36	
33	Tara Quinn-Smith	Canada	1:14:58	
34	Josephine Deemay	Tanzania	1:15:07	
35	Christelle Daunay	France	1:15:27	
36	Carmen Oliveras	France	1:15:42	
37	Ivana Iozzia	Italy	1:15:46	
38	Laura Turner	United States	1:16:11	
39	Tina Connelly	Canada	1:16:12	
40	María Luisa Lárraga	Spain	1:16:12	
41	Dolores Pulido	Spain	1:16:19	
42	Rosângela Faria	Brazil	1:16:28	
43	Jenny Spangler	United States	1:16:41	
44	Rosa Barbosa	Brazil	1:16:48	
45	María José Pueyo	Spain	1:16:50	
46	Stephanie Bylander	United States	1:16:58	
47	Yesenia Centeno	Spain	1:17:48	
48	Dorothy McMaham	United States	1:18:44	
49	Lisa Harvey	Canada	1:19:03	
50	Alla Zhilyayeva	Russia	1:19:25	
51	Marcella Mancini	Italy	1:19:30	
52	Debbie Robinson/Mason	Great Britain	1:19:32	
53	Michelle Lafleur	United States	1:20:36	
54	Lourdes Cruz	Puerto Rico	1:22:04	
55	Nili Avramski	Israel	1:22:34	
56	Feri Marince Subnafeu	Indonesia	1:23:41	NR
57	Yolanda Mercado	Puerto Rico	1:25:09	
58	Kerstin Mennenga	Liechtenstein	1:25:29	
59	Vivian Tang	Singapore	1:26:50	NR
60	Mable Chiwama	Zambia	1:28:45	
61	Tamica Thomas	Jamaica	1:31:41	NR
62	Merrecia James	Jamaica	1:31:54	PB
63	Chao Fong Leng	Macau	1:35:08	NR
64	Mona Mahmoud	Egypt	1:36:55	
—	Eyerusalem Kuma	Ethiopia	DNF	
—	Zahia Dahmani	France	DNF	
—	Hafida Gadi-Richard	France	DNF	
—	Arieta Martin	Jamaica	DNF	
—	Salina Kosgei	Kenya	DNF	
—	Selenge Avdiigerel	Mongolia	DNS	
—	Zuleima Amaya	Venezuela	DNS	

== Team Results ==
=== Men's ===
Rank	Country	Team	Time
1st place, gold medalist(s)	Ethiopia	Sileshi Sihine; Abebe Dinkessa; Lishan Yegezu	3:06:18
2nd place, silver medalist(s)	Eritrea	Yonas Kifle; Yared Asmeron; Tesfayohannes Mesfen	3:07:05
3rd place, bronze medalist(s)	Japan	Kazuo Ietani; Takayuki Matsumiya; Takanobu Otsubo	3:08:30
4	Qatar	Mubarak Hassan Shami; Sultan Khamis Zaman; Ahmed Jumaa Jaber	3:08:46
5	Kenya	James Mwangi Macharia; Paul Kimaiyo; Julius Kibet	3:09:32
6	United States	Ryan Shay; Jason Hartmann; Matt Downin	3:11:38
7	South Africa	Norman Dlomo; Sylvester Moleko; Jeffrey Gwebu	3:12:15
8	Spain	Antonio Peña; Fernando Rey; Javier Cortés	3:14:56
9	Botswana	Keenetse Moswasi; Kaelo Mosalagae; Ndabili Bashingili	3:17:27
10	Uganda	Wilson Busienei; Nicolas Kiprono; James Kibet	3:18:47
11	Canada	Jeremy Deere; Matthew McInnes; Andrew Smith	3:20:10
12	Chile	Raúl Mora; Carlos Jaramillo; Leonidas Rivadeneira	3:21:34
13	Israel	Ayele Setegne; Asaf Bimro; Mukat Derbe	3:21:43
14	Jamaica	Rupert Green; Gregory McKenzie; Andrew Gutzmore	3:41:22
15	Trinidad and Tobago	Curtis Cox; Richard Jones; Michael Alexander	3:56:29
—	Brazil	José Souza; José Eloy; Elson Gracioli	DNF

=== Women's ===
Rank	Country	Team	Time
1st place, gold medalist(s)	Romania	Constantina Diţă-Tomescu; Mihaela Botezan; Nuța Olaru	3:31:00
2nd place, silver medalist(s)	Russia	Galina Bogomolova; Lidiya Grigoryeva; Irina Timofeyeva	3:33:05
3rd place, bronze medalist(s)	Japan	Terumi Asoshina; Hiromi Ominami; Yoko Yagi	3:35:42
4	Ethiopia	Merima Hashim; Derartu Tulu; Letay Nagash	3:36:04
5	Great Britain	Mara Yamauchi; Hayley Haining; Susan Partridge	3:40:08
6	Canada	Lioudmila Kortchaguina; Nicole Stevenson; Tara Quinn-Smith	3:42:39
7	Italy	Deborah Toniolo; Vincenza Sicari; Ivana Iozzia	3:43:55
8	Spain	María Luisa Lárraga; Dolores Pulido; María José Pueyo	3:49:21
9	United States	Laura Turner; Jenny Spangler; Stephanie Bylander	3:49:50
—	France	Christelle Daunay; Carmen Oliveras; Zahia Dahmani	DNF
—	Jamaica	Tamica Thomas; Merrecia James; Arieta Martin	DNF
—	Kenya	Susan Chepkemei; Caroline Kilel; Salina Kosgei	DNF

== Participation ==
The participation of 156 athletes (87 men/69 women) from 43 countries is reported. Although announced, athletes from Cambodia, Palestine, and Venezuela did not show.

- Australia (2)
- Belarus (1)
- Botswana (4)
- Brazil (5)
- Burundi (2)
- Canada (10)
- Chile (3)
- Central African Republic (1)
- Costa Rica (1)
- Czech Republic (1)
- Dominica (1)
- Egypt (2)
- Eritrea (4)
- Ethiopia (9)
- France (5)
- French Polynesia (1)
- Indonesia (1)
- Israel (5)
- Italy (5)
- Jamaica (6)
- Japan (9)
- Kenya (7)
- Liechtenstein (2)
- Lithuania (1)
- Macau (2)
- Mexico (3)
- Mongolia (1)
- Netherlands (1)
- New Zealand (1)
- Puerto Rico (4)
- Qatar (5)
- Romania (5)
- Russia (5)
- Singapore (1)
- South Africa (5)
- Spain (8)
- Sri Lanka (1)
- Tanzania (3)
- Trinidad and Tobago (3)
- Uganda (4)
- United Kingdom (4)
- United States (10)
- Zambia (2)

== See also ==
- 2005 in athletics (track and field)
