= 2006 IAAF World Road Running Championships =

- Host city: Debrecen, Hajdú-Bihar, Hungary
- Nations: 39
- Athletes: 140
- Events: 2
- Dates: 2006-10-08
- Race length: 20 km
- Individual prize money (US$): 1st: 30,000; 2nd: 15,000; 3rd: 10,000; 4th: 7,000; 5th: 5,000; 6th: 3,000
- Team prize money (US$): 1st: 15,000; 2nd: 12,000; 3rd: 9,000; 4th: 7,500; 5th: 6,000; 6th: 3,000

The 1st IAAF World Road Running Championships were held in Debrecen, Hungary on 8 October 2006, the women's race starting at 11:00 and the men's race at 13:00. This was the first time the title of World Road Running Champion had been competed for, with this competition replacing the IAAF World Half Marathon Championships in the international sporting calendar. 140 athletes from 39 nations took part in the two races.

As well as individual honours, there is also a team event where the times of the first three runners home from each country are added together to produce the team standings. Only nations with at least three competitors entered in the race are eligible for this competition.

The race was notable for having the first disabled athlete to take part in a world championship athletics event. Mark Brown, who was competing for Gibraltar, lost his left arm in a traffic accident in 1981.

Detailed reports on the event and an appraisal of the results were given both for the men's race and for the women's race.

== The course ==
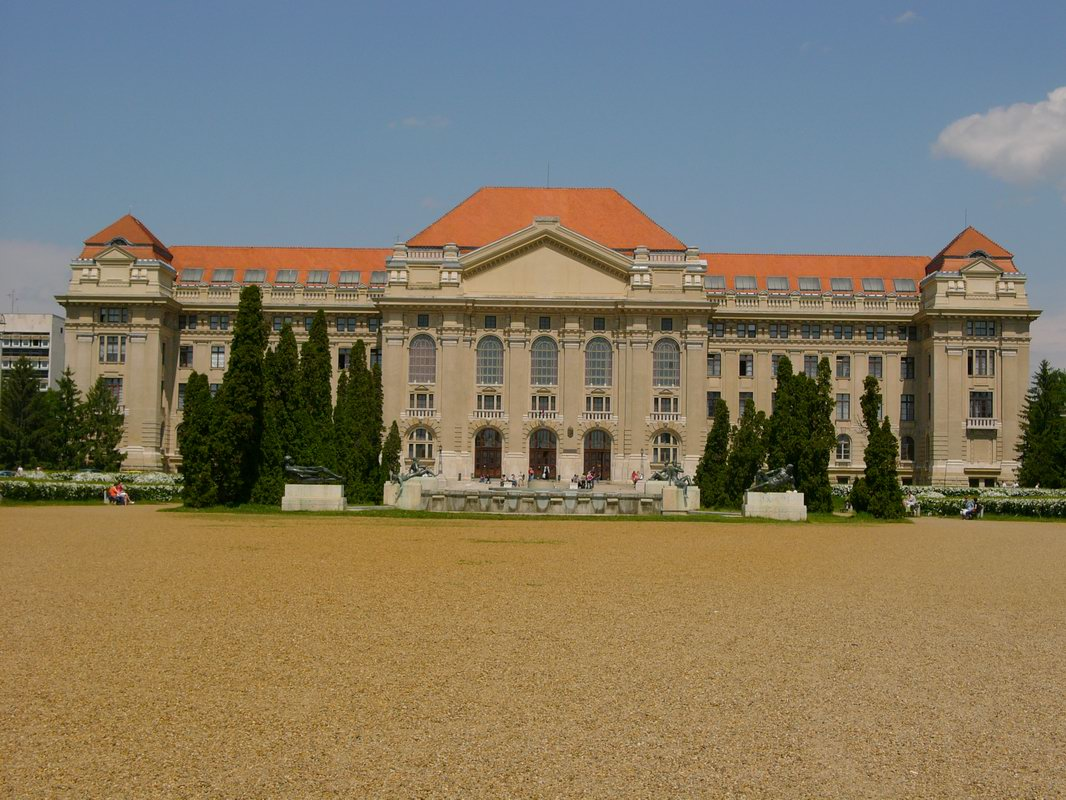

The total race distance was 20 kilometres, and consisted of four laps around a 5000-metre course. The race started and finished in front of the main building of the University of Debrecen (pictured left) on the northern edge of the city, and travelled in a clockwise direction around nearby parkland.

The runners started on Egyetem Square, outside the university, before heading around the circular Nagyerdei Avenue. Most of the course followed Nagyerdei Avenue, with two detours onto the roads inside the circle, passing the thermal baths and the Aquaticum Thermal & Wellness Hotel, before rounding the boating lake, passing the Nagyerdõ Stadium and the Hunguest Nagyerdõ Hotel. The race then headed back to Egyetem Square to complete the lap.

== Medallists ==
Event	Gold		Silver		Bronze	
Individual
Men	Zersenay Tadesse (ERI)	56:01	Robert Kipkorir Kipchumba (KEN)	56:41	Wilson Kiprotich Kebenei (KEN)	57:15
Women	Lornah Kiplagat (NED)	1:03:21	Constantina Diţă-Tomescu (ROU)	1:03:23	Rita Sitienei Jeptoo (KEN)	1:03:47
Team
Team Men	Kenya	2:51:18	Eritrea	2:53:19	Ethiopia	2:54:17
Team Women	Kenya	3:15:55	Ethiopia	3:18:50	Japan	3:19:00

== Race results ==
Complete results were published for the men's race, for the women's race, for men's team, and for women's team.

=== Men's ===
Rank	Athlete	Nationality	Time	Notes
1st place, gold medalist(s)	Zersenay Tadesse	Eritrea	56:01	CR
2nd place, silver medalist(s)	Robert Kipkorir Kipchumba	Kenya	56:41	NR
3rd place, bronze medalist(s)	Wilson Kiprotich Kebenei	Kenya	57:15	
4	Wilson Busienei	Uganda	57:21	NR
5	Wilfred Taragon	Kenya	57:22	
6	Deriba Merga	Ethiopia	57:27	
7	Tadesse Tola	Ethiopia	57:27	
8	Mubarak Hassan Shami	Qatar	57:33	NR
9	Dieudonné Disi	Rwanda	57:42	NR
10	Yonas Kifle	Eritrea	57:49	
11	Ryan Hall	United States	57:54	
12	Dickson Marwa	Tanzania	58:19	
13	Martin Toroitich	Uganda	58:26	
14	Essa Ismail Rashed	Qatar	58:31	
15	Cuthbert Nyasango	Zimbabwe	58:43	
16	Jamal Bilal Salem	Qatar	58:55	
17	Fred Mogaka	Kenya	59:07	
18	Lusapho April	South Africa	59:09	
19	James Theuri	France	59:11	
20	Demssew Tsega	Ethiopia	59:23	
21	Tesfayohannes Mesfen	Eritrea	59:29	
22	Iván Hierro	Spain	59:29	
23	Migidio Bourifa	Italy	59:37	
24	James Kibet	Uganda	59:40	
25	Antonello Petrei	Italy	59:45	
26	Patrick Musyoki	Kenya	59:54	
27	Kazuo Ietani	Japan	59:56	
28	Stephen Rogart	Tanzania	1:00:03	
29	Sultan Khamis Zaman	Qatar	1:00:07	
30	Andrew Carlson	United States	1:00:12	
31	Moulay Ali Ouadih	France	1:00:15	
32	Masayuki Tomura	Japan	1:00:24	
33	Enos Matalane	South Africa	1:00:25	
34	Max King	United States	1:00:26	
35	Masatoshi Ibata	Japan	1:00:30	
36	Ibrahim Fouliyeh	France	1:00:43	
37	Juan Vargas	Mexico	1:00:45	
38	Henryk Szost	Poland	1:00:51	
39	Iván Galán	Spain	1:00:55	
40	Sergey Rybin	Russia	1:00:57	
41	Francis Kirwa	Finland	1:00:57	
42	João de Lima	Brazil	1:00:59	
43	Rafael Iglesias	Spain	1:01:00	
44	Adriano Fortes	Brazil	1:01:05	
45	Martin Dent	Australia	1:01:15	
46	Jussi Utriainen	Finland	1:01:24	
47	Kahsay Kidane	Eritrea	1:01:34	
48	Norman Dlomo	South Africa	1:01:37	
49	Fabio Mascheroni	Italy	1:01:38	
50	Elson Gracioli	Brazil	1:01:53	
51	Pablo López	Spain	1:01:56	
52	Juan Carlos Romero	Mexico	1:01:57	
53	Gian Marco Buttazzo	Italy	1:02:00	
54	Tamás Tóth	Hungary	1:02:04	
55	Joseph Driscoll	United States	1:02:11	
57	Cian McLoughlin	Ireland	1:02:22	
58	Ernesto Zamora	Uruguay	1:02:23	
59	Tomonori Michikata	Japan	1:02:29	
60	Mphuthumi Ngedle	South Africa	1:02:34	
61	Balázs Csillag	Hungary	1:02:45	
62	George Mofokeng	South Africa	1:02:59	
63	Simon Munyutu	France	1:03:00	
64	Mohamed Abou Serea	Egypt	1:03:01	
65	Kazuyoshi Shimozato	Japan	1:03:03	
66	Alex Malinga	Uganda	1:03:06	
67	Christian Pflügl	Austria	1:03:07	
68	Igor Teteryukov	Belarus	1:03:14	
68	Rik Ceulemans	Belgium	1:03:14	
69	Martin Beckmann	Germany	1:03:19	
70	Joe McAlister	Ireland	1:03:36	
71	Solomon Tsige	Ethiopia	1:03:48	
72	Fernando Cabada Jr.	United States	1:03:52	
73	Aleksandr Moh	Kyrgyzstan	1:04:31	
74	Roland Kedves	Hungary	1:04:52	
75	András Juhász	Hungary	1:05:18	
76	Dániel Soos	Hungary	1:07:18	
77	Wilson Aquiro	Dominican Republic	1:07:49	
78	Mark Brown	Gibraltar	1:12:11	
79	Badboni El-Safadi	Palestine	1:41:15	
—	Paulo dos Santos	Brazil	DNF	
—	Yared Asmeron	Eritrea	DNF	
—	Lishan Yegezu	Ethiopia	DNF	
—	Nicholas Kemboi	Qatar	DNF	
—	Martin Hhaway Sulle	Tanzania	DNS	

=== Women's ===
Rank	Athlete	Nationality	Time	Notes
1st place, gold medalist(s)	Lornah Kiplagat	Netherlands	1:03:21	WR
2nd place, silver medalist(s)	Constantina Diţă-Tomescu	Romania	1:03:23	NR
3rd place, bronze medalist(s)	Rita Sitienei Jeptoo	Kenya	1:03:47	AR
4	Dire Tune	Ethiopia	1:05:16	NR
5	Edith Masai	Kenya	1:05:21	
6	Kayoko Fukushi	Japan	1:05:32	NR
7	Yurika Nakamura	Japan	1:05:36	
8	Natalya Berkut	Ukraine	1:05:42	
9	Souad Aït Salem	Algeria	1:06:11	
10	Teyba Erkesso	Ethiopia	1:06:15	
11	Anikó Kálovics	Hungary	1:06:20	
12	Gulnara Vygovskaya	Russia	1:06:30	
13	Natalya Kurbatova	Russia	1:06:33	
14	Eunice Jepkorir	Kenya	1:06:47	
15	Irina Timofeyeva	Russia	1:07:10	
16	Luminița Talpoș	Romania	1:07:11	
17	Ashu Kasim	Ethiopia	1:07:19	
18	Anna Thompson	Australia	1:07:23	
19	Ryoko Kizaki	Japan	1:07:52	
20	Masami Sakata	Japan	1:08:13	
21	Olesya Syreva	Russia	1:08:14	
22	Simona Staicu	Hungary	1:08:17	
23	Alina Ivanova	Russia	1:08:27	
24	Beáta Rakonczai	Hungary	1:08:38	
25	Mulu Seboka	Ethiopia	1:08:59	
26	Gloria Marconi	Italy	1:09:05	
27	Susan Partridge	Great Britain	1:09:17	
28	Lidia Șimon	Romania	1:09:22	
29	Adriana Pirtea	Romania	1:09:30	
30	Silvia Sommaggio	Italy	1:09:33	
31	Kirsten Melkevik Otterbu	Norway	1:09:37	
32	Justyna Bąk	Poland	1:09:48	
33	Paula Todoran	Romania	1:09:57	
34	Živilė Balčiūnaitė	Lithuania	1:10:10	
35	Ivana Iozzia	Italy	1:10:27	
36	Selma Borst	Netherlands	1:10:37	
37	Lisa Weightman	Australia	1:10:51	
38	Wendy Nicholls/Jones	Great Britain	1:10:55	
39	Hafida Gadi-Richard	France	1:11:07	
40	Annie Bersagel	United States	1:11:25	
41	Ann Alyanak	United States	1:11:48	
42	Erin Nehus	United States	1:11:51	
43	Desireé Davila	United States	1:11:56	
44	Lauren Shelley	Australia	1:12:22	
45	Maria Rodrigues	Brazil	1:12:26	
46	Yodit Mehari	Eritrea	1:12:27	
47	Merel de Knegt	Netherlands	1:12:32	
48	Sonja Friend-Uhl	United States	1:12:41	
49	Stefania Benedetti	Italy	1:12:57	
50	Susana Díaz Escobar	Mexico	1:13:09	
51	Petra Teveli	Hungary	1:13:24	
52	Maria Silva	Brazil	1:14:13	
53	Rosa Barbosa	Brazil	1:14:30	
54	Antonia da Silva	Brazil	1:15:16	
55	Zsuzsanna Vajda	Hungary	1:18:56	
56	Sara Abou Hassan	Egypt	1:19:55	
57	Maria Laura Bazallo	Uruguay	1:20:58	

== Team results ==
=== Men's ===
Rank	Country	Team	Time
1st place, gold medalist(s)	Kenya	Robert Kipkorir Kipchumba; Wilson Kiprotich Kebenei; Wilfred Taragon	2:51:18
2nd place, silver medalist(s)	Eritrea	Zersenay Tadesse; Yonas Kifle; Tesfayohannes Mesfen	2:53:19
3rd place, bronze medalist(s)	Ethiopia	Deriba Merga; Tadesse Tola; Demssew Tsega	2:54:17
4	Qatar	Mubarak Hassan Shami; Essa Ismail Rashed; Jamal Bilal Salem	2:54:59
5	Uganda	Wilson Busienei; Martin Toroitich; James Kibet	2:55:27
6	United States	Ryan Hall; Andrew Carlson; Max King	2:58:32
7	France	James Theuri; Moulay Ali Ouadih; Ibrahim Fouliyeh	3:00:09
8	Japan	Kazuo Ietani; Masayuki Tomura; Masatoshi Ibata	3:00:50
9	Italy	Migidio Bourifa; Antonello Petrei; Fabio Mascheroni	3:01:00
10	South Africa	Lusapho April; Enos Matalane; Norman Dlomo	3:01:11
11	Spain	Iván Hierro; Iván Galán; Rafael Iglesias	3:01:24
12	Brazil	João de Lima; Adriano Fortes; Elson Gracioli	3:03:57
13	Hungary	Tamás Tóth; Balázs Csillag; Roland Kedves	3:09:41

=== Women's ===
Rank	Country	Team	Time
1st place, gold medalist(s)	Kenya	Rita Sitienei Jeptoo; Edith Masai; Eunice Jepkorir	3:15:55
2nd place, silver medalist(s)	Ethiopia	Dire Tune; Teyba Erkesso; Ashu Kasim	3:18:50
3rd place, bronze medalist(s)	Japan	Kayoko Fukushi; Yurika Nakamura; Ryoko Kizaki	3:19:00
4	Romania	Constantina Diţă-Tomescu; Luminița Talpoș; Lidia Șimon	3:19:56
5	Russia	Gulnara Vygovskaya; Natalya Kurbatova; Irina Timofeyeva	3:20:13
6	Hungary	Anikó Kálovics; Simona Staicu; Beáta Rakonczai	3:23:15
7	Netherlands	Lornah Kiplagat; Selma Borst; Merel de Knegt	3:26:30
8	Italy	Gloria Marconi; Silvia Sommaggio; Ivana Iozzia	3:29:05
9	Australia	Anna Thompson; Lisa Weightman; Lauren Shelley	3:30:36
10	United States	Annie Bersagel; Ann Alyanak; Erin Nehus	3:35:04
11	Brazil	Maria Rodrigues; Maria Silva; Rosa Barbosa	3:41:09

== Participation ==
The participation of 140 athletes (83 men/57 women) from 39 countries is reported.

- Algeria (1)
- Australia (4)
- Austria (1)
- Belarus (1)
- Belgium (1)
- Brazil (8)
- Dominican Republic (1)
- Egypt (2)
- Eritrea (6)
- Ethiopia (9)
- Finland (2)
- France (5)
- Germany (1)
- Gibraltar (1)
- Hungary (10)
- Ireland (2)
- Italy (8)
- Japan (9)
- Kenya (8)
- Kyrgyzstan (1)
- Lithuania (1)
- Mexico (3)
- Netherlands (3)
- Norway (1)
- Palestine (1)
- Poland (2)
- Qatar (5)
- Romania (5)
- Russia (6)
- Rwanda (1)
- South Africa (5)
- Spain (4)
- Tanzania (2)
- Uganda (4)
- Ukraine (1)
- United Kingdom (2)
- United States (10)
- Uruguay (2)
- Zimbabwe (1)

== See also ==
- 2006 in athletics (track and field)
- IAAF
- Road running
