= Athletics at the 2007 All-Africa Games – Women's half marathon =

The women's half marathon event at the 2007 All-Africa Games was held on July 19.

== Results ==
Rank	Name	Nationality	Time	Notes
1st place, gold medalist(s)	Souad Aït Salem	Algeria	1:13:35	
2nd place, silver medalist(s)	Atsede Bayisa	Ethiopia	1:13:54	
3rd place, bronze medalist(s)	Kenza Dahmani	Algeria	1:14:40	
4	Ruth Kutol	Kenya	1:15:14	
5	Helaria Johannes	Namibia	1:15:27	
6	Mindaye Gishu	Ethiopia	1:16:19	
7	Tabitha Tsatsa	Zimbabwe	1:17:33	
8	Nasria Azaidj	Algeria	1:17:46	
9	Clarisse Rasoarizay	Madagascar	1:17:58	
10	Tanith Maxwell	South Africa	1:18:27	
11	Askanech Mengistu	Ethiopia	1:18:35	
12	Millicent Boadi	Ghana	1:18:56	
13	Epiphanie Nyirabarame	Rwanda	1:19:57	
14	Janeth John Yuda	Tanzania	1:21:11	
15	Nebiat Habte Mariam	Eritrea	1:22:12	
16	Poppy Mlambo	South Africa	1:22:53	
17	Sandrine Kengue	Gabon	1:25:49	
18	Kafayat Babalola	Nigeria	1:30:23	
19	Togna Domingasi	Guinea-Bissau	1:33:06	
	Ladi Musa	Nigeria	DNF	
