= Yaghi =

Yaghi could refer to:

- The Outlaw (1953 film), 1953 Iranian film
- Yaghi (surname), Arabic surname
- Rebel (Iranian TV series), 2022
