= Abebe Dinkesa =

Ethiopian long-distance runner (born 1984)

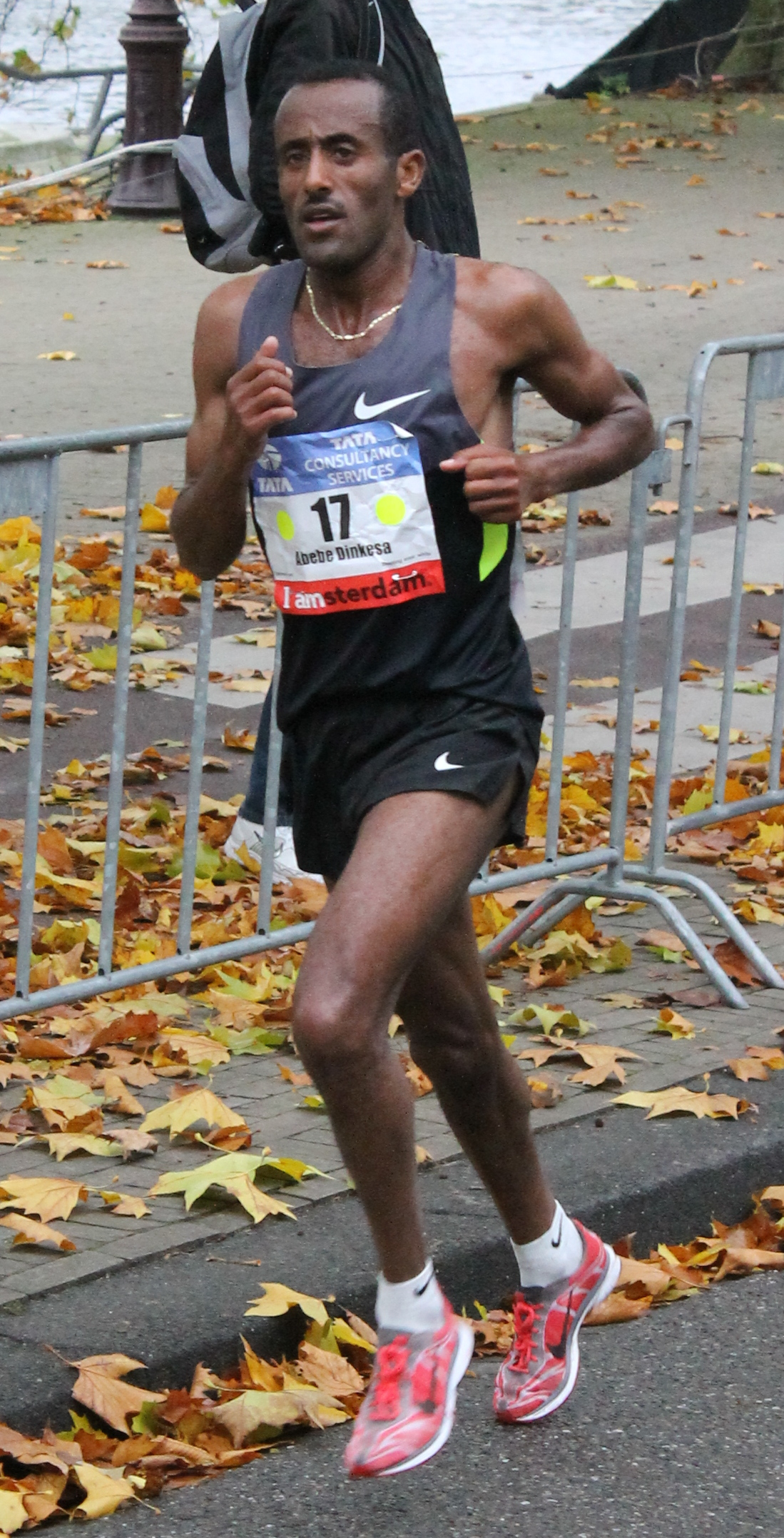
- Dinkesa during the 2012 Amsterdam Marathon

Medal record

Men's athletics

Representing Ethiopia

African Championships
Silver medal – second place	2004 Brazzaville	10,000 m
Bronze medal – third place	2006 Bambous	10,000 m

World Cross Country Championships
Gold medal – first place	2005 Saint-Galmier	Senior team

Abebe Dinkesa Negera (born 6 March 1984) is an Ethiopian professional long-distance runner who specializes in the 10,000 metres. He came to prominence with a silver medal at the 2004 African Championships in Athletics and he won a bronze medal in the same event two years later. He is the sixth fastest ever over the 10,000 m with a best time of 26:30.74 set in 2005.

He was fourth at the 2005 IAAF World Cross Country Championships and also represented Ethiopia at the World Championships in Athletics later that year. An Achilles tendon problem ruled him out entirely in 2007 and affected his later performances. He won the African Mountain Running Championships at the Obudu Ranch Race in 2010. He also competes in road running competitions, having won at the BOclassic and Great Ethiopian Run as well as coming fifth at the World Half Marathon Championships in 2005.

== Career ==
His first outing at a major event was at the 2002 IAAF World Cross Country Championships. He finished ninth in the junior race and shared the team silver medal alongside race winner Gebregziabher Gebremariam. Two years later he began making an impact in the senior ranks by winning the silver medal in the 10,000 metres at the 2004 African Championships in Athletics behind Charles Kamathi. He was selected to represent Ethiopia at the 2004 IAAF World Half Marathon Championships and he finished in tenth place. He fared better the following month as he helped his country to victory at the International Chiba Ekiden in Japan and then won at the Great Ethiopian Run in a course record time. Dinkesa ended the year with a win at the Iris Lotto Cross Cup in Belgium.

He competed at the global level on all surfaces in 2005: he was fourth at the 2005 IAAF World Cross Country Championships (taking the team gold with the winner Kenenisa Bekele), managed seventh in the 10,000 m at the 2005 World Championships in Athletics, and then set a half marathon personal best of 1:01:53 to take fifth place and the team title at the 2005 IAAF World Half Marathon Championships. He elevated himself to the fifth fastest 10,000 m runner of all-time at the FBK Games in Hengelo, completing the distance in a time of 26:30.74 (although Bekele finished ahead of him). He also ran at the 2005 IAAF World Athletics Final, finishing ninth over 5000 metres. At the end of the year he retained his title at the Lotto Cross Cup and won the 10K race at the BOclassic in Bolzano.

He won the 2006 Cross Internacional de Itálica but his season was interrupted by typhoid fever, causing him to give poor performances at the 2006 IAAF World Cross Country Championships. He recovered and won the 10,000 m bronze medal at the 2006 African Championships in Athletics. At the end of the year and went on to win the Cross Internacional de Venta de Baños in Spain. He was absent from competition for the 2007 season due to an Achilles injury.

He returned at the 2008 IAAF World Cross Country Championships, but was far from his top form and finished in 41st place. His performance at the 2008 IAAF World Half Marathon Championships marked a return to fitness as he took seventh place. He won the Obudu Ranch International Mountain Race in 2008 and his course record breaking performance earned him US$50,000 (the greatest prize available for a mountain race). Dinkesa took a victory over major rivals at the Great Edinburgh Cross Country in January the following year, beating Zersenay Tadese and Eliud Kipchoge to the finish. He missed out on qualification for that year's Cross Country Championships but he did gain selection for the 2009 World Championships in Athletics. He competed in the 10,000 m, but he failed to finish the race. He finished third at the Obudu Race in December, which was also the first African Mountain Running Championships. He won the African title in 2010, holding off a challenge from Habtamu Fikadu.

He began his 2011 season at the Egmond Half Marathon and he came third overall.

== Achievements ==
Year	Competition	Venue	Position	Notes
2002	World Cross Country Championships	Dublin, Ireland	9th	Junior race
2002	World Cross Country Championships	Dublin, Ireland	2nd	Junior team
2004	African Championships	Brazzaville, Republic of the Congo	2nd	10,000 m
2004	World Half Marathon Championships	New Delhi, India	10th	Half marathon
2005	World Cross Country Championships	Saint-Galmier, France	4th	Long race
2005	World Cross Country Championships	Saint-Galmier, France	1st	Team competition
2005	World Championships	Helsinki, Finland	7th	10,000 m
2005	World Athletics Final	Monte Carlo, Monaco	9th	5000 m
2005	World Half Marathon Championships	Edmonton, Canada	5th	Half marathon
2006	African Championships	Bambous, Mauritius	3rd	10,000 m
2006	Zevenheuvelenloop	Nijmegen, Netherlands	2nd	15,000 m
2008	World Cross Country Championships	Edinburgh, United Kingdom	41st	Senior race
2008	World Half Marathon Championships	Rio de Janeiro, Brazil	7th	Half marathon
2009	World Championships	Berlin, Germany	DNF	10,000 m

=== Personal bests ===
- 3000 metres – 7:53.7 min (2002)
- 5000 metres – 12:55.58 min (2005)
- 10,000 metres – 26:30.74 min (2005)
- Half marathon – 1:01:53 hrs (2005)
