= Yagi (surname) =

Yagi (written: 八木 or 屋宜) is a Japanese surname. Notable people with the surname include:

- Aki Yagi (八木 あき; 1895–1983), Japanese anarchist writer and activist
- Akiko Yagi (八木 亜希子; born 1965), Japanese announcer, television presenter, actress
- Alissa Yagi (八木 アリサ; born 1995), Japanese model and actress
- Bon Yagi (八木 ボン; born 1948), Japanese-American entrepreneur
- Hidetsugu Yagi (八木 秀次; 1886–1976), Japanese electrical engineer and professor, developer of the Yagi-Uda antenna
- Hirokazu Yagi (八木 弘和; born 1959), Japanese ski jumper
- Hiroshi Yagi (八木 裕; born 1965), Japanese baseball player
- Jūkichi Yagi (八木 重吉; 1898–1927), Japanese poet
- Kanae Yagi (八木 かなえ; born 1992), Japanese weightlifter
- Kazuo Yagi (八木 一夫; 1918–1979), Japanese potter and ceramic artist
- Kenzō Yagi (八木 健三; 1914–2008), Japanese mineralogist and petrologist
- Kousei Yagi (八木 光生; born 1930), Japanese voice actor
- Masao Yagi (八木 正生; 1932–1991), Japanese jazz musician
- Masumi Yagi (八木 真澄; born 1974), Japanese comedian of the comedy duo Savanna
- Meitatsu Yagi (八木 明達; born 1944), Japanese karate master and teacher
- Meitoku Yagi (八木 明徳; 1912–2003), Japanese karate master and teacher
- Michiyo Yagi (八木 美知依; born 1962), Japanese musician
- Mieko Yagi (八木 三枝子; 1950–2015), Japanese equestrian
- Norihiro Yagi (八木 教広; born 1968), Japanese manga writer and artist
- Rikako Yagi (八木 莉可子; born 2001), Japanese model and actress
- Ryosuke Yagi (八木 亮祐; born 1990), Japanese baseball player
- Sadaharu Yagi (八木 禎治), Japanese-born record producer, mixing engineer, recording engineer
- Seizaburo Yagi (八木 清三郎; born 1937), Japanese swimmer
- Shogo Yagi (屋宜 照悟; born 1989), Japanese professional baseball player
- Takayuki Yagi (八木 隆行; born 1975), Japanese wrestler and wrestling referee
- Takeshi Yagi (八木 毅; born 1967), Japanese TV director and producer
- Tomoya Yagi (八木 智哉; born 1983), Japanese professional baseball pitcher
- Yasutarō Yagi (八木 保太郎; 1903–1987), Japanese screenwriter
- Yoko Yagi (八木 洋子; born 1980), Japanese long-distance runner
- Yoshinori Yagi (八木 義徳; 1911–1999), Japanese author
- Yuki Yagi (八木 侑紀), Japanese voice actress and singer
- Yusei Yagi (八木 勇征; born 1997), Japanese singer and actor, member of Fantastics from Exile Tribe

== Fictional characters ==
- Haruhiko Yagi (八木 晴彦), a character in the manga/anime series Fighting Spirit
- Toshinori Yagi/All Might (八木 俊典), a character in the manga/anime series My Hero Academia

== See also ==
- Yaghi (surname)
