= James Macharia =

James Macharia may refer to:

- James Mwangi Macharia (born 1984), Kenyan road running athlete
- James Wainaina Macharia (born 1959), Kenyan accountant and Cabinet Secretary for Health
