= Kurbatov =

Kurbatov (Russian: Курбатов [kʊrˈbatəf]; f. Kurbatova [kʊrˈbatəvə]) is a Russian surname. Notable people with the surname include:

- Alexey Kurbatov (born 1994), Russian cyclist
- Ekaterina Kurbatova (born 1992), Russian gymnast
- Evgeny Kurbatov (born 1988), Russian ice hockey defenceman
- Natalya Kurbatova (born 1985), Russian long-distance runner
- Stoyanka Kurbatova (born 1955), Bulgarian rower
- Valentin Kurbatov (1939–2021), Russian literary critic and writer
- Valeria Kurbatova (born 1992), Russian harpist
