= Kebenei =

Kebenei is a surname of Kenyan origin. Notable people with the surname include:

- Stanley Kebenei (born 1989), Kenyan long-distance runner
- Wilson Kebenei (born 1980), Kenyan half marathon runner
