= 2013 Nippon Professional Baseball season =

2013 NPB season
- League: Nippon Professional Baseball
- Sport: Baseball
- Duration: March 29 – November 3

Central League pennant
- League champions: Yomiuri Giants
- Runners-up: Hanshin Tigers
- Season MVP: Wladimir Balentien (Yakult)

Pacific League pennant
- League champions: Tohoku Rakuten Golden Eagles
- Runners-up: Saitama Seibu Lions
- Season MVP: Masahiro Tanaka (Rakuten)

Climax Series
- CL champions: Yomiuri Giants
- CL runners-up: Hiroshima Toyo Carp
- PL champions: Tohoku Rakuten Golden Eagles
- PL runners-up: Chiba Lotte Marines

Japan Series
- Venue: Nippon Paper Kleenex Stadium Miyagi, Sendai, Miyagi; Tokyo Dome, Bunkyō, Tokyo
- Champions: Tohoku Rakuten Golden Eagles
- Runners-up: Yomiuri Giants
- Finals MVP: Manabu Mima (Rakuten)

NPB seasons
- ← 2012 2014 →

The 2013 Nippon Professional Baseball season was the 64th season since the NPB was reorganized in 1950.

== Juiced ball scandal ==
At the beginning of the 2013 NPB season, a new livelier ball was introduced in secret. This juiced up baseball allowed more home runs to be scored, leading to Tokyo Yakult Swallows outfielder Wladimir Balentien to break the 55 single season home run record set by Sadaharu Oh and later tied by Tuffy Rhodes and Alex Cabrera. This caused three-term NPB commissioner Ryozo Kato to resign, although he claimed to be unaware of the juiced baseballs.

== Regular season standings ==
Central League regular season standings
| Team | G | W | L | T | Pct. | GB |
|---|---|---|---|---|---|---|
| Yomiuri Giants | 144 | 84 | 53 | 7 | .613 | — |
| Hanshin Tigers | 144 | 73 | 67 | 4 | .521 | 12.5 |
| Hiroshima Toyo Carp | 144 | 69 | 72 | 3 | .489 | 17.0 |
| Chunichi Dragons | 144 | 64 | 77 | 3 | .454 | 22.0 |
| Yokohama DeNA BayStars | 144 | 64 | 79 | 1 | .448 | 23.0 |
| Tokyo Yakult Swallows | 144 | 57 | 83 | 4 | .407 | 28.5 |

Pacific League regular season standings
| Team | G | W | L | T | Pct. | GB |
|---|---|---|---|---|---|---|
| Tohoku Rakuten Golden Eagles | 144 | 82 | 59 | 3 | .582 | — |
| Saitama Seibu Lions | 144 | 74 | 66 | 4 | .529 | 7.5 |
| Chiba Lotte Marines | 144 | 74 | 68 | 2 | .521 | 8.5 |
| Fukuoka SoftBank Hawks | 144 | 73 | 69 | 2 | .514 | 9.5 |
| Orix Buffaloes | 144 | 66 | 73 | 5 | .475 | 15.0 |
| Hokkaido Nippon-Ham Fighters | 144 | 64 | 78 | 2 | .451 | 18.5 |

== Climax Series ==
Note: All of the games that are played in the first two rounds of the Climax Series are held at the higher seed's home stadium. The team with the higher regular-season standing also advances if the round ends in a tie.

First stage
Central League
2 | Hanshin Tigers | 0
3 | Hiroshima Toyo Carp | 2
Pacific League
2 | Saitama Seibu Lions | 1
3 | Chiba Lotte Marines | 2

Final stage
1 | Yomiuri Giants | 4
3 | Hiroshima Toyo Carp | 0
1 | Tohoku Rakuten Golden Eagles | 4
3 | Chiba Lotte Marines | 1

Japan Series
CL1 | Yomiuri Giants | 3
PL1 | Tohoku Rakuten Golden Eagles | 4

=== First stage ===
The regular season league champions, the Tohoku Rakuten Golden Eagles (PL) and the Yomiuri Giants (CL), received byes to the championship round.

==== Central League ====
Hiroshima Toyo Carp (2) vs. Hanshin Tigers (0)

| Game | Date | Score | Location | Time | Attendance |
|---|---|---|---|---|---|
| 1 | October 12 | Hiroshima Toyo Carp – 8, Hanshin Tigers – 1 | Koshien Stadium | 3:34 | 46,923 |
| 2 | October 13 | Hiroshima Toyo Carp – 7, Hanshin Tigers – 4 | Koshien Stadium | 3:02 | 46,902 |

==== Pacific League ====
Chiba Lotte Marines (2) vs. Saitama Seibu Lions (1)

| Game | Date | Score | Location | Time | Attendance |
|---|---|---|---|---|---|
| 1 | October 12 | Chiba Lotte Marines – 11, Saitama Seibu Lions – 1 | Seibu Dome | 3:24 | 32,880 |
| 2 | October 13 | Chiba Lotte Marines – 0, Saitama Seibu Lions – 15 | Seibu Dome | 3:16 | 33,914 |
| 3 | October 14 | Chiba Lotte Marines – 4, Saitama Seibu Lions – 1 | Seibu Dome | 3:01 | 33,832 |

=== Final stage ===
The regular season league champions, the Tohoku Rakuten Golden Eagles (PL) and the Yomiuri Giants (CL), received a one-game advantage.

==== Central League ====
Yomiuri Giants (4) vs. Hiroshima Toyo Carp (0)

| Game | Date | Score | Location | Time | Attendance |
|---|---|---|---|---|---|
| 1 | October 16 | Hiroshima Toyo Carp – 2, Yomiuri Giants – 3 | Tokyo Dome | 3:27 | 45,107 |
| 2 | October 17 | Hiroshima Toyo Carp – 0, Yomiuri Giants – 3 | Tokyo Dome | 2:26 | 45,316 |
| 3 | October 18 | Hiroshima Toyo Carp – 1, Yomiuri Giants – 3 | Tokyo Dome | 2:32 | 46,081 |

==== Pacific League ====
Tohoku Rakuten Golden Eagles (4) vs. Chiba Lotte Marines (1)

| Game | Date | Score | Location | Time | Attendance |
|---|---|---|---|---|---|
| 1 | October 17 | Chiba Lotte Marines – 0, Tohoku Rakuten Golden Eagles – 2 | Miyagi Baseball Stadium | 2:55 | 24,332 |
| 2 | October 18 | Chiba Lotte Marines – 4, Tohoku Rakuten Golden Eagles – 2 | Miyagi Baseball Stadium | 3:25 | 24,097 |
| 3 | October 19 | Chiba Lotte Marines – 0, Tohoku Rakuten Golden Eagles – 2 | Miyagi Baseball Stadium | 3:00 | 24,396 |
| 4 | October 21* | Chiba Lotte Marines – 5, Tohoku Rakuten Golden Eagles – 8 | Miyagi Baseball Stadium | 3:33 | 24,264 |

* Postponed from October 20 due to rain

== Japan Series ==
PL Tohoku Rakuten Golden Eagles (4) vs. CL Yomiuri Giants (3)

| Game | Date | Score | Location | Time | Attendance |
|---|---|---|---|---|---|
| 1 | October 26 | Yomiuri Giants – 2, Tohoku Rakuten Golden Eagles – 0 | Miyagi Baseball Stadium | 3:20 | 25,209 |
| 2 | October 27 | Yomiuri Giants – 1, Tohoku Rakuten Golden Eagles – 2 | Miyagi Baseball Stadium | 3:16 | 25,219 |
| 3 | October 29 | Tohoku Rakuten Golden Eagles – 5, Yomiuri Giants – 1 | Tokyo Dome | 3:26 | 44,940 |
| 4 | October 30 | Tohoku Rakuten Golden Eagles – 5, Yomiuri Giants – 6 | Tokyo Dome | 4:07 | 44,968 |
| 5 | October 31 | Tohoku Rakuten Golden Eagles – 4, Yomiuri Giants – 2 | Tokyo Dome | 3:49 | 44,995 |
| 6 | November 2 | Yomiuri Giants – 4, Tohoku Rakuten Golden Eagles – 2 | Miyagi Baseball Stadium | 3:16 | 25,271 |
| 7 | November 3 | Yomiuri Giants – 0, Tohoku Rakuten Golden Eagles – 3 | Miyagi Baseball Stadium | 3:15 | 25,249 |

== League leaders ==
=== Central League ===
Batting leaders
| Stat | Player | Team | Total |
|---|---|---|---|
| Batting average | Tony Blanco | Yokohama DeNA BayStars | .333 |
| Home runs | Wladimir Balentien | Tokyo Yakult Swallows | 60 |
| Runs batted in | Tony Blanco | Yokohama DeNA BayStars | 136 |
| Runs | Wladimir Balentien | Tokyo Yakult Swallows | 94 |
| Hits | Matt Murton | Hanshin Tigers | 178 |
| Stolen bases | Yoshihiro Maru | Hiroshima Toyo Carp | 29 |

Pitching leaders
| Stat | Player | Team | Total |
|---|---|---|---|
| Wins | Yasuhiro Ogawa | Tokyo Yakult Swallows | 16 |
| Losses | Daisuke Miura; Ryosuke Yagi | Yokohama DeNA BayStars; Tokyo Yakult Swallows | 13 |
| Earned run average | Kenta Maeda | Hiroshima Toyo Carp | 2.10 |
| Strikeouts | Randy Messenger | Hanshin Tigers | 183 |
| Innings pitched | Randy Messenger | Hanshin Tigers | 196 1/3 |
| Saves | Kentaro Nishimura | Yomiuri Giants | 42 |

=== Pacific League ===
Batting leaders
| Stat | Player | Team | Total |
|---|---|---|---|
| Batting average | Yuya Hasegawa | Fukuoka SoftBank Hawks | .341 |
| Home runs | Michel Abreu | Hokkaido Nippon-Ham Fighters | 31 |
| Runs batted in | Hideto Asamura | Saitama Seibu Lions | 110 |
| Runs | Dai-Kang Yang | Hokkaido Nippon-Ham Fighters | 93 |
| Hits | Yuya Hasegawa | Fukuoka SoftBank Hawks | 198 |
| Stolen bases | Dai-Kang Yang | Hokkaido Nippon-Ham Fighters | 47 |

Pitching leaders
| Stat | Player | Team | Total |
|---|---|---|---|
| Wins | Masahiro Tanaka | Tohoku Rakuten Golden Eagles | 24 |
| Losses | Mitsuo Yoshikawa | Hokkaido Nippon-Ham Fighters | 15 |
| Earned run average | Masahiro Tanaka | Tohoku Rakuten Golden Eagles | 1.27 |
| Strikeouts | Chihiro Kaneko | Orix Buffaloes | 200 |
| Innings pitched | Chihiro Kaneko | Orix Buffaloes | 223 1/3 |
| Saves | Naoya Masuda | Chiba Lotte Marines | 33 |

== 2013 average attendance ==
| Team | Games | Total attendance | Av. attendance |
|---|---|---|---|
| Yomiuri | 72 | 3,008,197 | 41,780 |
| Hanshin | 72 | 2,771,603 | 38,494 |
| SoftBank | 72 | 2,408,993 | 33,458 |
| Chunichi | 72 | 1,998,188 | 27,752 |
| Nippon-Ham | 72 | 1,855,655 | 25,772 |
| Seibu | 72 | 1,600,841 | 22,233 |
| Hiroshima | 72 | 1,565,598 | 21,744 |
| Orix | 72 | 1,438,467 | 19,978 |
| Yakult | 72 | 1,432,695 | 19,898 |
| Yokohama | 72 | 1,425,728 | 19,801 |
| Rakuten | 72 | 1,281,087 | 17,792 |
| Lotte | 72 | 1,260,439 | 17,506 |

== See also ==
- 2013 Korea Professional Baseball season
- 2013 Major League Baseball season
