= Gulnara Vygovskaya =

Russian long-distance runner

Gulnara Vygovskaya (born 6 September 1980) is a Russian long-distance runner who specializes in marathon races.

She finished twelfth at the 2006 World Road Running Championships, helping the Russian team take a fifth place in the team competition.

Her personal best time in the half marathon is 1:12:06 hours, achieved in September 2006 in Saransk. In the marathon she has 2:32:51 hours, achieved in October 2006 in Frankfurt.

== International competitions ==
Representing Russia
Year	Competition	Venue	Position	Event	Result	Notes
2006	World Road Running Championships	Debrecen, Hungary	12th	Half marathon	1:06:30	
2006	World Road Running Championships	Debrecen, Hungary	5th	Team	3:20:13	With Natalya Kurbatova and Irina Timofeyeva
2007	World Championships	Osaka, Japan	12th	Marathon	2:33:57	
2014	European Championships	Zürich, Switzerland	23rd	Marathon	2:35:56	
2014	European Championships	Zürich, Switzerland	3rd	Team Cup	7:42:03	With Natalya Puchkova and Albina Mayorova
