= Terumi =

- Gender: Unisex

Origin
- Origin: Japanese
- Meaning: Different meanings depending on the kanji used

Terumi (written: 照美, 輝美, 煕巳 or てるみ in hiragana) is a unisex Japanese given name. Notable people with the name include:

- Terumi Asoshina (阿蘇品 照美; born 1982), Japanese long-distance runner
- Terumi Kurata (蔵田 照美; born 1951), Japanese handball player
- Terumi Niki (二木 てるみ; born 1949), Japanese actress
- Terumi Ogura (小倉 輝美; born 1963), Japanese cyclist

== Male ==
- Terumi Tanaka (田中 煕巳; born 1932), Japanese anti-nuclear and anti-war activist

== Fictional characters ==
- Afuro Terumi, a fictional character from the Inazuma Eleven franchise
- Yuuki Terumi, a fictional character from the game BlazBlue: Chronophantasma
