= Obudu Ranch International Mountain Race =

Coordinates: 6°22′36″N 9°22′42″E

- Date: Late November
- Location: Obudu, Nigeria
- Event type: Mountain race
- Distance: 11.25 km (800 m incline)
- Established: 2005
- Website: Obudu Mountain Race

The Obudu Ranch International Mountain Race is an annual 11.25 km mountain running competition that takes place in late November in Obudu, Cross River State, Nigeria. First held in 2005, it has the largest total prize money available of any mountain race and is known as "the world's richest mountain race". The men's and women's competition winners receive US$50,000 each, and there is a total prize pot of around $250,000.

The combination of the distance of the race and the rewards on offer means that it attracts world-class road running athletes as well as mountain running athletes. It is an associate member race of the World Mountain Running Association (WMRA) and is also endorsed by the International Association of Athletics Federations (IAAF).

The race was created by Athletics Federation of Nigeria when Dan Ngerem was President and major sponsor was Nigerians Telecommunications Company MTN when Adrian Wood was CEO and Donald Duke the former Governor of Cross River State, who devised it as a means of raising awareness of Obudu Cattle Ranch – a tourist resort. The course begins at a height of 800 m above sea level, and as it traces a path towards the summit of Mount Obudu it climbs a further 800 m, with the finishing point of the race being a total 1600 m above sea level.

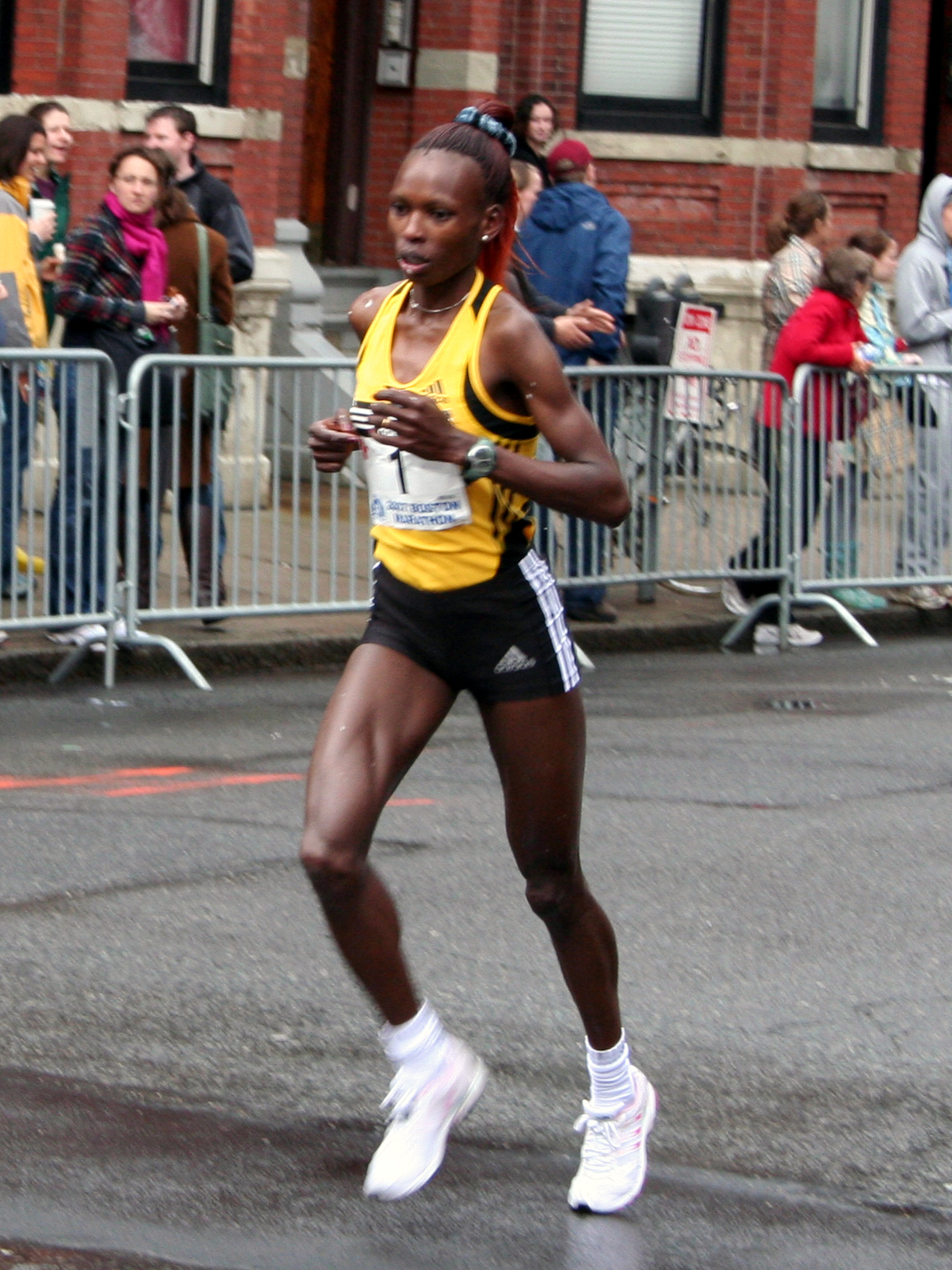
The 2007 winner of the women's race, Rita Jeptoo

The inaugural edition in 2005, the first ever professional mountain running race to be held in the country, mainly comprised Nigerian runners and a select group of invited professional mountain runners. The following two editions saw prominent mountain runners mix with established road runners for the first time: Stockholm Marathon winner Rita Jeptoo took the women's 2007 title. The women's race at the 2008 edition demonstrated the advantages of mountain running experience as Mestawet Tufa, that year's World Cross Country silver medallist, built up a large lead but struggled with the incline near the finish. She was overtaken by Mountain Running World Champion Andrea Mayr, who set a new course record, while Tufa collapsed and failed to finish just 50 m from the line.

For the 2009 race, WMRA president Danny Hughes and Liyel Imoke (the new Cross River State governor) decided to inaugurate the first men's African Mountain Running Championships as part of the Obudu Mountain race. Habtamu Fikadu was elected as the first African Mountain Running champion, Geoffrey Kusuro took silver and Abebe Dinkesa won bronze. In the team competition, Ethiopia won while Uganda and hosts Nigeria won the minor medals.

== Past senior race winners ==
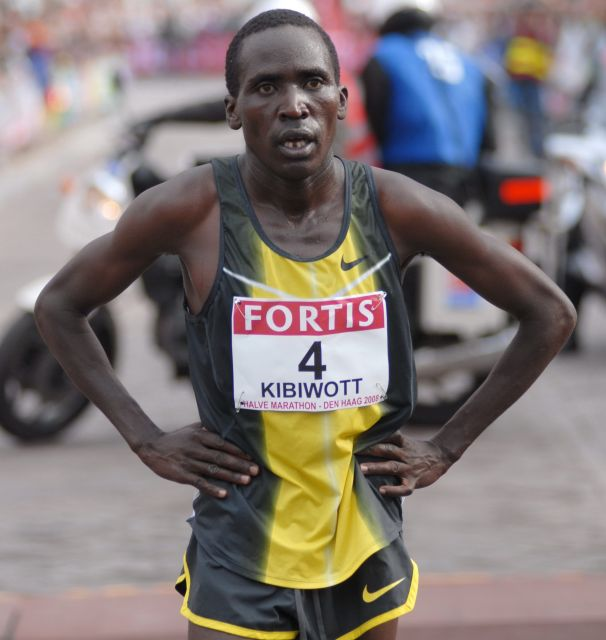
Francis Kibiwott was the second winner of the men's race

Key: Course record African Championship race

Edition	Year	Men's winner	Time (m:s)	Women's winner	Time (m:s)
1st	2005	Ben Dubois (AUS)	48:44	Anna Pichrtová (CZE)	55:46
2nd	2006	Francis Kibiwott (KEN)	42:26	Rehima Kedir (ETH)	53:26
3rd	2007	Habtamu Fikadu (ETH)	42:50	Rita Jeptoo (KEN)	51:42
4th	2008	Abebe Dinkesa (ETH)	41:45	Andrea Mayr (AUT)	51:14
5th	2009	Habtamu Fikadu (ETH)	42:03	Mamitu Daska (ETH)	49:12
6th	2010	Abebe Dinkesa (ETH)	42:21	Meselech Melkamu (ETH)	48:57
7th	2011	Hunegnaw Mesfin (ETH)	41:50	Genet Yalew (ETH)	48:45
