= Joe McAlister =

Joe McAlister may refer to:

- Joe McAlister, character in Under the Dome (TV series)
- Joe McAlister (athlete) in 2006 IAAF World Road Running Championships
