= Yaghi (surname) =

Yaghi (Arabic: ياغي) is an Arabic surname.

Notable people with the surname include:

- Brigitte Yaghi (born 1987), Lebanese pop singer
- Kenan Yaghi (born 1976), Syrian politician
- Racha Yaghi (born 2002), Lebanese footballer
- Omar M. Yaghi (born 1965), American-Jordanian academic

== See also ==
- Yagi (surname)
- Yağısıyan
- The Outlaw, a film known as Yaghi in Persian
