= Takanobu Otsubo =

Japanese long-distance runner

Takanobu Otsubo (大坪 隆誠, Otsubo Takanobu; born 15 June 1976) is a Japanese long-distance runner who specializes in the half marathon and ekiden.

He finished seventeenth at the 2005 World Half Marathon Championships, which was good enough to help Japan finish third in the team competition.

His personal best time is 1:01:55 hours, achieved in March 2005 in Yamaguchi. In the 10,000 metres his personal best time is 28:14.92 minutes, achieved in November 2005 in Hachiōji.

He is a policeman from the Osaka Prefectural Police, and often referred to as the fastest running policeman in Japan.
