= 2006 African Championships in Athletics – Men's 10,000 metres =

The men's 10,000 metres event at the 2006 African Championships in Athletics was held at the Stade Germain Comarmond on August 13.

== Results ==
Rank	Name	Nationality	Time	Notes
1st place, gold medalist(s)	Moses Ndiema Kipsiro	Uganda	28:03.46	
2nd place, silver medalist(s)	Mike Kigen	Kenya	28:03.70	
3rd place, bronze medalist(s)	Abebe Dinkesa	Ethiopia	28:05.07	
4	John Cheruiyot Korir	Kenya	28:10.83	
5	Tadese Tola	Ethiopia	28:15.16	
6	Tesfayohannes Mesfen	Eritrea	28:19.88	
7	Wilfred Taragon	Kenya	28:24.57	
8	Amanuel Mesel	Eritrea	28:29.24	
9	Raji Assef	Ethiopia	28:36.07	
10	Mulugheta Tesfayohannes	Eritrea	29:10.58	
11	Isaac Kiprop	Uganda	29:50.99	
12	John Stephen Rogart	Tanzania	30:02.65	
13	Etienne Bizimana	Burundi	30:04.66	
14	Nelson Cruz	Cape Verde	30:44.16	
15	Ilunga Mande Zatara	Democratic Republic of the Congo	31:02.78	
16	Danjuma Kopkuddi	Nigeria	32:11.88	
	Dieudonné Disi	Rwanda	DNS	
	Fulgence Rakotondrasoa	Madagascar	DNS	
	Ahmed Baday	Morocco	DNS	
