= Habtamu Fikadu =

Ethiopian runner

Habtamu Fikadu (born 13 March 1988 in Shewa) is an Ethiopian runner. He won the bronze medal in the 400 metres at the 2005 African Junior Athletics Championships.

He was the 2007 winner of the Obudu Ranch International Mountain Race, which brought him US$50,000 in prize money, and he repeated the feat two years later in 2009. He was runner-up at the 2010 competition, taking the silver medal for the African Mountain Running Championships.

== Achievements ==
Year	Competition	Venue	Position	Notes
2006	World Cross Country Championships	Fukuoka, Japan	6th	Junior race
2008	World Cross Country Championships	Edinburgh, Scotland	9th	Senior race
2008	World Cross Country Championships	Edinburgh, Scotland	2nd	Team competition

=== Personal bests ===
- 400 metres - 46.79 s (2006)
- 3000 metres - 7:57.78 min (2006)
- 10,000 metres - 27:06.47 min (2007)
