= Souad Aït Salem =

Algerian long-distance runner

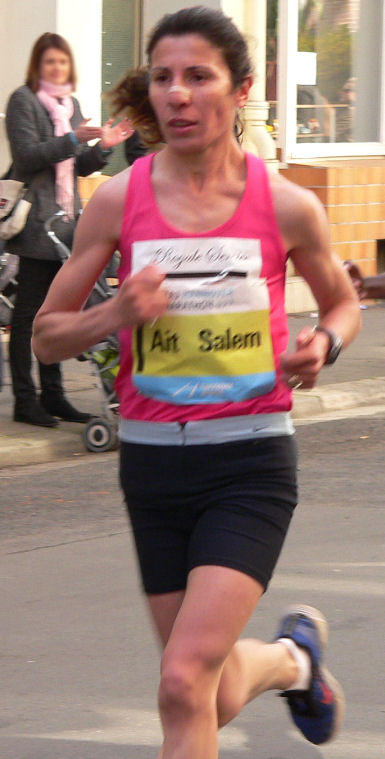
- Souad Aït Salem in 2015

Personal information
- Born: 6 January 1979 (age 47) Mécheria, Algeria
- Height: 1.67 m (5 ft 5 1/2 in)
- Weight: 50 kg (110 lb)

Sport
- Country: Algeria
- Sport: Athletics
- Event: Marathon
Medal record
Women's athletics
Representing Algeria
All-Africa Games
Gold medal – first place	2007 Algiers	Half marathon
African Championships
Gold medal – first place	2000 Algiers	10,000 m
Mediterranean Games
Gold medal – first place	2005 Almería	10,000 m
Silver medal – second place	2013 Mersin	Half marathon
Bronze medal – third place	2013 Mersin	10,000 m

Souad Aït Salem, also known as Souad Aït Mahour-Bacha (born 6 January 1979 in Mécheria, Algeria) is an Algerian long-distance runner who specializes mainly in the half marathon and marathon. She won gold in the 10,000 metres at the 2000 African Championships in Athletics and the 2005 Mediterranean Games. Salem also won the gold in the half marathon at the 2007 All-Africa Games. She holds Algerian women's long-distance record for every distance between 3000 metres and the marathon.

Her first appearance on the world stage was in the junior race at the 1997 IAAF World Cross Country Championships, where she finished in 98th place. Salem reached the top fifty at the 2000 and 2003 IAAF World Half Marathon Championships. She ran in the 5000 metres at the 2003 World Championships in Athletics and the 2004 Summer Olympics but did not progress beyond her heat in either competition.

After winning the Universiade cross country competition, Salem switched to the marathon distance in 2006 and the move paid off: she won the 2006 Alexander the Great Marathon in Thessaloniki. She won the women's race at the 13th Rome Marathon on 18 March 2007. Her time was 2:25:08 hrs was a new course record. She finished 9th in the women's marathon at the 2008 Beijing Olympics, with a time of 2:28:29 hrs. At the 2007 World Championships in Athletics, she finished 16th in the marathon race. She finished sixth at the London Marathon in 2008 and went on to finish in ninth place in the women's marathon race at the 2008 Beijing Olympics.

After a long break from competition, she ran her first marathon in almost four years at the Prague Marathon. She finished in fourth place with a time of 2:27:21 hours. She raced in the marathon at the 2012 Summer Olympics, finishing in 37th place.

In 2017 she tested positive for Torasemide and was banned from competition for 18 months between 11 March 2017 and 8 October 2018.

== Personal bests ==
- 3000 metres – 8:47.99 min (2006)
- 5000 metres – 15:07.49 min (2006)
- 10,000 metres – 32:13.15 min (2004)
- 20 kilometres – 1:06:11 hrs (2006)
- Half marathon – 1:09:15 hrs (2008)
- Marathon – 2:25:08 hrs (2007)

== Achievements ==
Year	Competition	Venue	Position	Event	Notes
Representing Algeria
2000	African Championships	Algiers, Algeria	1st	10,000 m	
2002	African Championships	Radès, Tunisia	5th	10,000 m	
2003	World Championships	Paris, France	24th (h)	5000 m	15:34.64
2004	Pan Arab Games	Algiers, Algeria	1st	5000 m	
2004	Pan Arab Games	Algiers, Algeria	1st	10,000 m	
2004	Pan Arab Games	Algiers, Algeria	1st	Half marathon	
2004	Olympic Games	Athens, Greece	33rd (h)	5000 m	16:02.10
2004	Olympic Games	Athens, Greece	–	10,000 m	DNF
2005	Mediterranean Games	Almería, Spain	4th	5000 m	15:31.34
2005	Mediterranean Games	Almería, Spain	1st	10,000 m	32:55.48
2006	World Road Running Championships	Debrecen, Hungary	9th	20 km	1:06:11 PB
2007	All-Africa Games	Algiers, Algeria	1st	Half Marathon	1:13:35
2007	Rome City Marathon	Rome, Italy	1st	Marathon	2:25:08 NR
2007	World Championships	Osaka, Japan	16th	Marathon	2:35:09
2008	Olympic Games	Beijing, China	9th	Marathon	2:28:29
2011	Pan Arab Games	Doha, Qatar	4th	Half marathon	1:15:13
2013	Mediterranean Games	Mersin, Turkey	3rd	10,000 m	33:19:34
2015	World Championships	Beijing, China	—	Marathon	DNF
2022	Mediterranean Games	Oran, Algeria	9th	5000 m	16:21.60
2023	Arab Games	Oran, Algeria	–	10,000 m	DNF
2026	Mediterranean Games	Taranto, Italy	8th	10,000 m	35:55.40
