= Jason Hartmann =

American long-distance runner

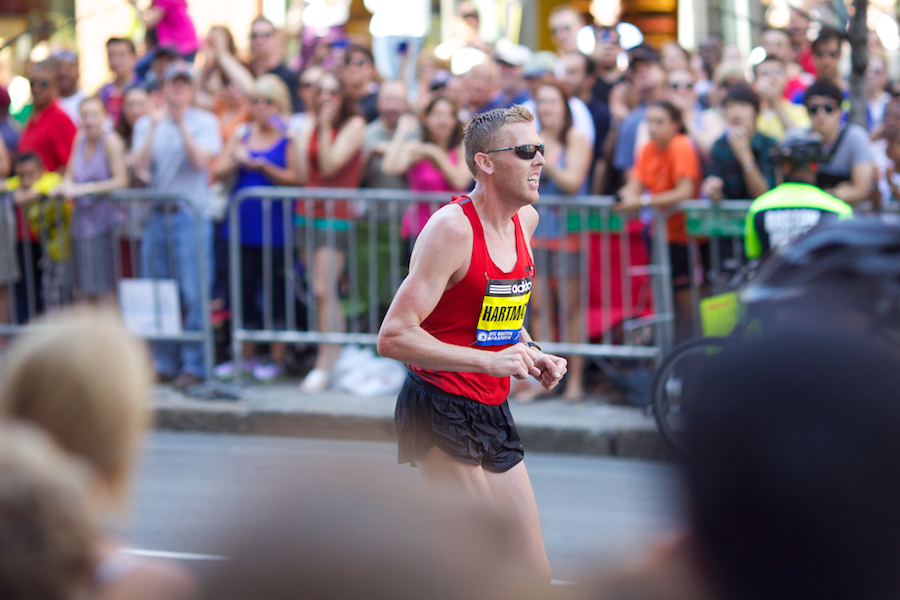
- Hartmann at the 2012 Boston Marathon

Personal information
- Born: 21 March 1981 (age 45)
- Height: 6 ft 3 in (1.91 m)
- Weight: 203 lb (92 kg)

Jason Hartmann (born March 23, 1981) is an NCAA coach and a former American long-distance runner who specializes in marathon races. He won the Twin Cities Marathon in 2009. He was the top American finisher at the 2010 Chicago Marathon and was fourth at the Boston Marathon in both 2012 and 2013. His personal record for the event is 2:11:06.

He has represented the United States on the road, grass and track, having competed at the IAAF World Half Marathon Championships, IAAF World Cross Country Championships and the Pan American Games. Collegiately he ran in cross country and track for the University of Oregon.

== Running career ==
=== Early life ===
Hartmann grew up in Rockford, Michigan and graduated from Rockford High School in 1999. He made his first national team as a junior runner at the 2000 IAAF World Cross Country Championships, where he finished in 66th place. He went on to earn a BA in education and sociology at the University of Oregon and competed in distance events for the Oregon Ducks athletic team. He earned six All-America honours during his time there, with highlights being fourth place in the 10,000 meters at the NCAA Outdoor Championships in 2002 and 2003, and two runner-up finishes in the event at the Pac-10 championships.

=== First road races ===
After college, he began to take part in road running competitions. He was third at the 2005 USA 20K championships which earned him a place for the 2005 IAAF World Half Marathon Championships, where he came twentieth in a personal best of 1:03:32 hours. He began 2006 with a personal record of 63:07 minutes for the half marathon, taking second place in the national championship race in Houston, Texas. A fifth-place finish at the USA Cross Country Championships led to an appearance at the 2006 IAAF World Cross Country Championships, although he managed only 76th place in the long race. He set a 5000 meters best of 13:36.33 minutes shortly afterwards, and placed seventh in the 10,000 m at the USA Outdoor Track and Field Championships. His marathon debut came at the 2006 Chicago Marathon and he finished the event in a time of 2:15:50 hours for twentieth place.

In 2007 he was 15th at the National Cross Country Championships, but was third at the 15 Championships behind Meb Keflezighi and Ryan Hall. He failed to finish (due to Ryan Hall's fast pace) at the London Marathon in April, but enjoyed some success over 10,000 m: he set a personal best of 28:15.22 minutes at the Stanford Invitational and was sixth at both the national championships at 2007 Pan American Games. He attempted to gain Olympic selection at the U.S. Olympic Team Trials in New York City, but his personal record run of 2:15:27 was only enough for tenth place. Three stress fractures left him unable to compete for most of 2008 and he considered abandoning the sport. He changed coach in 2009 from Brad Hudson to Steve Jones and competed at mass races including the Cherry Blossom 10-miler, Steamboat Classic and Bolder Boulder. He also ran in four national road championship races, with his best finish being a fourth place at the 25K race. Hartmann had his first major win at the Twin Cities Marathon, where he defeated the favored Kenyan runners in the final stages to lift the title in a time of 2:12:09.

=== Major marathons ===
He came fourth at the Fifth Third River Bank Run in 2010, but preparations for the 2010 Chicago Marathon were interrupted by a break with his coach, Steve Jones. Hartmann instead began training with Lee Troop, who was setting up a small elite group known as the Boulder Track Club in Boulder, Colorado. The coach change led to his best marathon finish of 2:11:06 hours for eighth place and he was the first American to cross the line. In May 2011 he beat Keflezighi to the top U.S. finish at the 100th Bay to Breakers. He was runner-up in the Las Vegas Half Marathon with a time of 1:03:34. Hartmann had geared his preparations towards he 2012 U.S. Olympic Marathon Trials, chase pack leader at halfway point, but finished far off his target of the top three as he ended the race in 32nd place. Keen to make up for this disappointing performance, Hartmann set his eyes on the 2012 Boston Marathon . He decided to run tactically and stayed away from the leading pack. The leaders dramatically slowed in the heat while Hartmann worked his way up to field to eventually finish in fourth place (the only non-Kenyan to make the top six).

== Coaching career ==
Elise Cranny was under Coach Hartmann's guidance 2008 - 2014. Elise is now a Pac-12 student-athlete at Stanford University. Elise Cranny is #3 on all-time scholastic 1500-meter list.

Saginaw Valley State University Head Coach Rod Cowan has announced the addition of Jason Hartmann to the Cardinal coaching staff for the cross country and track & field programs. He will work mainly with the distance runners during the indoor and outdoor track & field seasons. In August 2018, Hartmann recognized the skill and ability of SVSU's throws coach Nick Halabicky adding he viewed him as a mentor.

Hartmann was added to the staff at Central Michigan University for the 2019-2020 campaign. He was mainly the men’s distance coach. Unfortunately, the COVID-19 pandemic forced the athletics shutdown in March 2020, cutting all collegiate NCAA seasons short. Then weeks later, Central Michigan became the first Division 1 University to cut men’s track and field due to the pandemic. This ended Jason’s short lived coaching stint at CMU.

== Personal bests ==
- 5000 meters - 13:36.33 min (2006)
- 10,000 meters - 28:15.22 min (2007)
- 15 km road - 44:12 minutes (2007)
- Half marathon - 61:52 minutes (2013)
- Marathon - 2:11:06 hours (2011)

== Competition record ==
Year	Competition	Venue	Position	Event	Notes
2000	World Cross Country Championships	Vilamoura, Portugal	66th	Junior race	
2005	World Half Marathon Championships	Fukuoka, Japan	74th	Senior race	
2007	Pan American Games	Rio de Janeiro, Brazil	6th	10,000 meters	

Marathons

- 2006 Chicago Marathon - 20th (2:15:50)
- 2007 London Marathon - DNF - compete Ryan Hall's fast pace
- 2007 U.S. Olympic Trials - 10th (2:15:27)
- 2009 Twin Cities Marathon - 1st (2:12:09)
- 2010 Chicago Marathon - 8th (2:11:06)
- 2012 U.S. Olympic Trials - 32nd (2:16:44)
- 2012 Boston Marathon - 4th (2:14:31)
- 2013 Boston Marathon - 4th (2:12:12)
