= Rael Nguriatukei Kinyara =

Kenyan long-distance runner

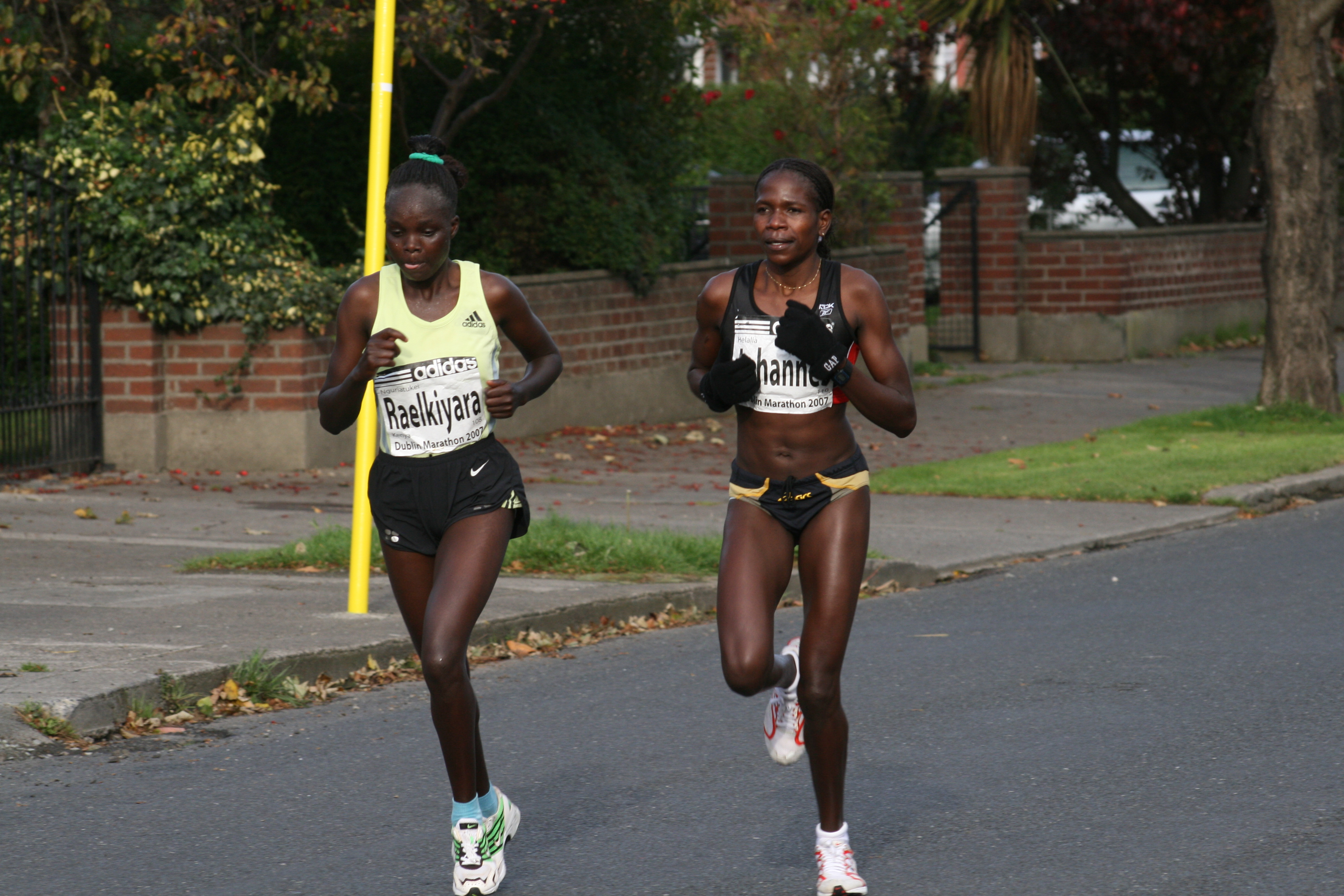
Kinyara (left) in her first European marathon in Dublin in 2007.

Nguriatukei Rael Kinyara (born 4 April 1984) is a Kenyan long-distance runner who competes in the marathon. She has won races in Madrid, Graz, Padua and Luxembourg.

In her first marathon outing in Europe, she came third at the 2007 Dublin Marathon with a time of 2:33:27 hours. She won her next race over the distance, the 2008 Madrid Marathon, and defeated Derartu Tulu in the process. She was runner-up at the Reims Marathon later that year behind Agnes Kiprop. She only competed once in 2009, but won the Graz Marathon in a personal best and course record time of 2:33:04 hours.

Kinyara broke another course record at the 2010 Maratona di Sant'Antonio in Padua, improved her best further with a finish of 2:30:19 hours. A third consecutive win and course best followed at the Europe Marathon in June 2010, where she set the women's race record at 2:34:28 hours. She made a step up at her first top level marathon race in October 2011, as she knocked nearly five minutes of her former best with her fourth-place performance of 2:25:23 hours at the Eindhoven Marathon.

At the 2012 Hamburg Marathon, Kinyara appeared to have taken the biggest victory of her career, winning in a course record and personal best time of 2:23:47 hours. However, she tested positive in the post-race drug test for norandrosterone - a metabolite of the anabolic steroid nandrolone - and was banned for doping for two years. Her period of ineligibility from athletics competition expired on 18 July 2014.
