= 2014 European Marathon Cup =

Sporting competition held in Switzerland

10th European Marathon Cup
- Venue: Zürich, Switzerland
- Dates: 16–17 August 2014
- Competitors: 92

Champions
- Men: Russia (6:46:04)
- Women: Italy (7:27:59)

The 2014 European Marathon Cup was the tenth edition of the quadrennial team marathon competition between European countries, which was held in Zürich, Switzerland on 16–17 August. The start and finish points were located on Bürkliplatz, and the route was set along a 10-kilometer circuit on the city streets. It was held in conjunction with the men's and women's individual marathon races at the 2014 European Athletics Championships.

Each national team was ranked on the sum of the finishing times of their top three athletes. Each team could enter more than three athletes, and non-scoring athletes of the top three teams were also awarded medals. In total, 92 athletes from 14 European countries entered the team race. Women participated in 11 national teams (45 participants) and men in 10 teams (47 participants). Each country could put up to 6 people in each of the two races.

Russia won the men's team competition with a time of 6:46:04 hours, led by individual bronze medallist Aleksey Reunkov. Italy won the women's race with a time of 7:27:59, led by individual silver medallist Valeria Straneo.

== Results ==
=== Men ===
Location	Team	Athletes	Time	Total time
1st place, gold medalist(s)	Russia	Aleksey Reunkov	2:12:15	6:46:04
1st place, gold medalist(s)	Russia	Stepan Kiselev	2:15:45	6:46:04
1st place, gold medalist(s)	Russia	Sergey Rybin	2:18:04	6:46:04
1st place, gold medalist(s)	Russia	Aleksey Sokolov	(DNF)	6:46:04
2nd place, silver medalist(s)	France	Abdellatif Meftah	2:13:16	6:46:29
2nd place, silver medalist(s)	France	Jean-Damascène Habarurema	2:16:04	6:46:29
2nd place, silver medalist(s)	France	Benjamin Malaty	2:17:09	6:46:29
2nd place, silver medalist(s)	France	El Hassane Ben Lkhainouch	(2:17:54)	6:46:29
2nd place, silver medalist(s)	France	Ruben Indongo	(2:20.39)	6:46:29
3rd place, bronze medalist(s)	Switzerland	Viktor Röthlin	2:13:07	6:46:48
3rd place, bronze medalist(s)	Switzerland	Tadesse Abraham	2:15:05	6:46:48
3rd place, bronze medalist(s)	Switzerland	Christian Kreienbühl	2:18:36	6:46:48
3rd place, bronze medalist(s)	Switzerland	Michael Ott	(2:22:51)	6:46:48
3rd place, bronze medalist(s)	Switzerland	Patrick Wieser	(2:25:33)	6:46:48
3rd place, bronze medalist(s)	Switzerland	Adrian Lehmann	(2:26:37)	6:46:48
4	Italy			6:46:58
5	Denmark			6:54:01
6	Ukraine			7:00:14
7	Ireland			7:01:02
8	Netherlands			7:08:25
9	Sweden			7:09:56
10	Israel			7:19:50

Participants in italics did not count towards the team's final time

=== Women ===
Location	Team	Athletes	Time	Total time
1st place, gold medalist(s)	Italy	Valeria Straneo	2:25:27	7:27:59
1st place, gold medalist(s)	Italy	Anna Incerti	2:29:58	7:27:59
1st place, gold medalist(s)	Italy	Nadia Ejjafini	2:32:34	7:27:59
1st place, gold medalist(s)	Italy	Emma Quaglia	(2:32:45)	7:27:59
1st place, gold medalist(s)	Italy	Deborah Toniolo	(2:33:02)	7:27:59
1st place, gold medalist(s)	Italy	Rosaria Console	(2:43:40)	7:27:59
2nd place, silver medalist(s)	Portugal	Jéssica Augusto	2:25:41	7:33:06
2nd place, silver medalist(s)	Portugal	Filomena Costa	2:32:50	7:33:06
2nd place, silver medalist(s)	Portugal	Marisa Barros	2:34:35	7:33:06
2nd place, silver medalist(s)	Portugal	Doroteia Peixoto	(DNF)	7:33:06
3rd place, bronze medalist(s)	Russia	Natalya Puchkova	2:32:22	7:42:03
3rd place, bronze medalist(s)	Russia	Albina Mayorova	2:33:45	7:42:03
3rd place, bronze medalist(s)	Russia	Gulnara Vygovskaya	2:35:56	7:42:03
3rd place, bronze medalist(s)	Russia	Nadezhda Leontyeva	(2:42:41)	7:42:03
4	Lithuania			7:45:38
5	Switzerland			7:47:01
6	Netherlands			7:49:55
7	Ireland			7:58:28
8	Sweden			8:06:51
9	France			8:15:37
10	Estonia			8:16:36

Participants in italics did not count towards the team's final time
