= Luxembourg Marathon =

Road running event in Luxembourg

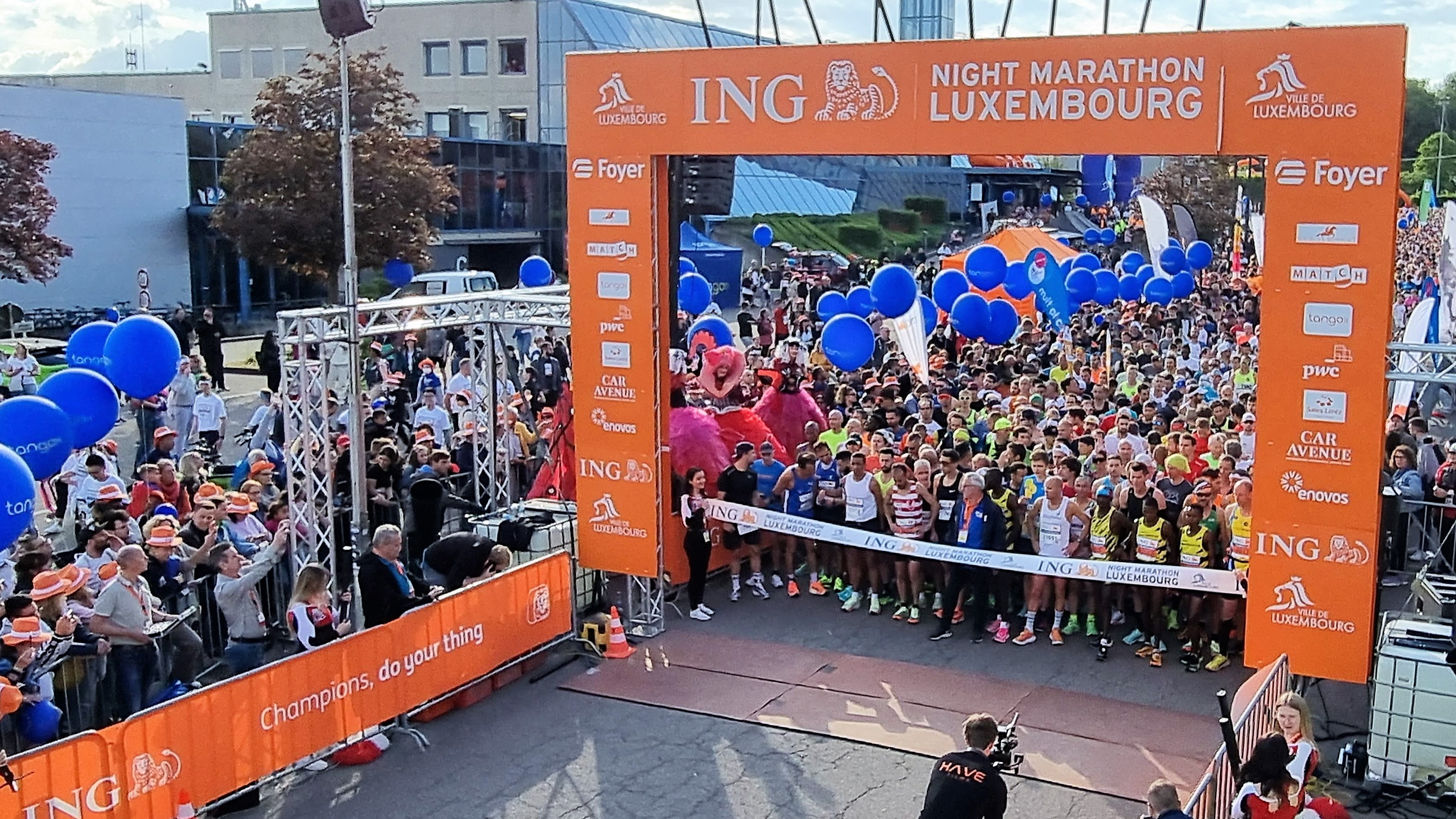
- Starting line of the 2022 Marathon at Luxexpo
- Date: Mid-May
- Location: Luxembourg City, Luxembourg
- Event type: Road
- Distance: Marathon, Half marathon, 4.2km run
- Primary sponsor: ING Group
- Established: 2006
- Course records: Men's: 2:12:10 (2018) (Kenya) Mark Kangogo; Women's: 2:34:23 (2015) (Kenya) Naomi Tuei
- Website: Luxembourg Marathon
- Participants: 17,000 (2025)

The Luxembourg Marathon (official: ING Night Marathon Luxembourg, sponsored by ING) is an annual marathon by night in Luxembourg which was held for the first time in 2006 as Europe Marathon.

== Past winners ==
Key: Course record

Edition	Year	Men's winner	Time (h:m:s)	Women's winner	Time (h:m:s)
1st	2006	Kamel Kohil (ALG)	2:17:28	Pascale Schmoetten (LUX)	3:04:57
2nd	2007	Alex Malinga (UGA)	2:17:17	Ruth Kutol (KEN)	2:41:26
3rd	2008	Mohamed Msandeki (TAN)	2:15:29	Rose Jepkemboi (KEN)	2:43:21
4th	2009	John Ngeno (KEN)	2:19:17	Irene Cherop (KEN)	2:43:08
5th	2010	Stanley Rono (KEN)	2:19:13	Gishu Mindaye (ETH)	2:39:56
6th	2011	Teferi Bacha (ETH)	2:15:42	Nguriatukei Kiyara (KEN)	2:34:28
7th	2012	Bellor Yator (KEN)	2:13:45	Mahlet Melese (ETH)	2:45:56
8th	2013	Bellor Yator (KEN)	2:17:51	Shewaye Debelu (ETH)	2:43:33
9th	2014	Johnstone Maiyo (KEN)	2:15:44	Meseret Godana (ETH)	2:38:56
10th	2015	John Komen (KEN)	2:13:55	Naomi Tuei (KEN)	2:34:23
11th	2016	John Komen (KEN)	2:12:57	Belaynesh Shifera (ETH)	2:42:34
12th	2017	Edwin Kiptoo (KEN)	2:16:55	Tsehay Gebre (ETH)	2:46:08
13th	2018	Mark Kangogo (KEN)	2:12:10	Lakelesh Feysa (ETH)	2:51:33
14th	2019	John Komen (KEN)	2:16:05	Betty Chepkwony (KEN)	2:38:55
	2020/21	cancelled due to coronavirus pandemic			
15th	2022	Ezekiel Koech (KEN)	2:15:46	Mercy Tuitoek (KEN)	2:43:34
16th	2023	Erick Kiptoo (KEN)	2:13:14	Mercy Kipkemoi (KEN)	2:37:20
17th	2024	Richard Ruto Marakwen (KEN)	2:23:04	Irine Jeruto (KEN)	2:43:49
18th	2025	James Dunn (LUX)	2:29:04	Edith Stiepel (GER)	3:12:32
