= Ahmed Jumah Jaber =

Qatari long-distance runner

Ahmed Jumah Jaber (born 29 December 1983) is a Qatari long-distance runner who specializes in the marathon.

Notable results include a 38th place at the 2004 Olympic Games, a 23rd place at the 2005 World Half Marathon Championships, a fifth place at the 2006 Asian Games, and a 29th place at the 2007 World Road Running Championships.

His personal best times are 28:40.96 minutes in the 10,000 metres, achieved in June 2006 in Neerpelt; 1:02:08 hours in the half marathon, achieved in October 2007 in Udine; and 2:14:48 hours in the marathon, achieved in April 2004 in the Hamburg Marathon.

== International competitions ==
- All results regarding marathon, unless stated otherwise

Year	Competition	Venue	Position	Event	Notes
Representing Qatar
2004	Olympic Games	Athens, Greece	38th	Marathon	2:20:27
2007	Pan Arab Games	Cairo, Egypt	4th	Half marathon	1:03:35
