= Athletics at the 2007 Pan American Games – Men's 10,000 metres =

Men's 10,000 metres at the Pan American Games

The men's 10,000 metres event at the 2007 Pan American Games was held on July 27.

== Results ==
Rank	Name	Nationality	Time	Notes
1st place, gold medalist(s)	José David Galván	Mexico	28:08.74	GR
2nd place, silver medalist(s)	Marílson Gomes dos Santos	Brazil	28:09.30	
3rd place, bronze medalist(s)	Alejandro Suárez	Mexico	28:09.95	
4	Jorge Torres	United States	28:28.48	
5	Clodoaldo da Silva	Brazil	28:28.92	PB
6	Jason Hartmann	United States	29:02.89	
7	William Naranjo	Colombia	29:13.93	
8	Freddy González	Venezuela	29:38.04	
9	Javier Guarín	Colombia	30:02.59	SB
10	Cleveland Forde	Guyana	31:23.00	
	Jorge César Fernández	Bolivia	DNF	
