= Robert Kipkorir Kipchumba =

Kenyan long-distance runner

Medal record

Men's athletics

Representing Kenya

IAAF World Road Running Championships
Silver medal – second place	2006 Debrecen	20 km

Robert Kipkorir Kipchumba (born 2 February 1984 in Kaptul, Marakwet District) is a Kenyan long-distance track, and road running athlete.

== Biography ==
He started running while at Hossen Primary School. Kipchumba won the junior race at the 2000 World Cross Country Championships in Vilamoura finishing in 22:49. Later that year in Santiago de Chile he won the gold medal at the 2000 World Junior Championships in Athletics when he finished the 10,000 m in 28:54.37. In 2001 and 2002 his running was hampered by injuries. He was recruited by Kenyan Army in 2002. He won the Stramilano half marathon in 2004.

On 8 October 2006 he won the silver medal at the World Road Running Championships. He set a Kenyan national record of 56:41 minutes for the 20 km distance. He won the Lisbon Half Marathon in 2007 with a time of 1:00.31.

He made his marathon debut at the 2009 Rotterdam Marathon, finishing eighth and setting a time of 2:09:54 hours. He won the 2011 Xiamen Marathon with a course record of 2:08:07, in spite of poor weather conditions. His second race of the year came at the Lisbon Half Marathon in March and he came fourth in the fast-paced race.

He is managed by Gianni Demadonna and coached by Renato Canova. Kipchumba has a 4-acre (16,000 m^{2}) farm in Trans-Nzoia District. He is married with two children (as of 2004).
