= Merel de Knegt =

Dutch long-distance runner

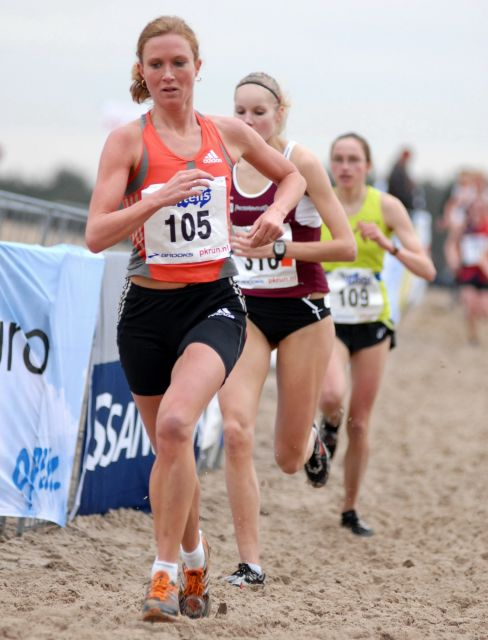

Personal information
- Full name: Merel de Knegt
- Born: 9 May 1979 (age 47) Tilburg, Netherlands
- Years active: 2004-present
- Height: 1.70 m (5 ft 7 in)
- Weight: 55 kg (121 lb)

Achievements and titles
- Personal bests: 10 km – 33:09 (2010); 15 km – 51:43 (2012); 20 km – 1:12:32 (2006) half marathon – 1:13:10 (2010) marathon - 2:35:07
- Updated on 11 April 2010

Merel de Knegt (born 9 May 1979 in Tilburg) is a Dutch runner. She is the sister of Gerben de Knegt. Her sole major international outing for the Netherlands was the 2006 IAAF World Road Running Championships, where she came 47th overall.

She won the 2009 Rotterdam Half Marathon. She finished tenth at the 2010 edition, but her time of 2:38:41 was a personal best and as the top domestic finisher she was elected the Dutch champion. At the 2012 CPC Loop Den Haag (The Hague), de Knegt reached the podium with a third-place finish.

== Career highlights ==
Dutch National Championships
2006 - The Hague, 3rd, Half marathon
2007 - Schoorl, 1st, 10 km
2007 - The Hague, 1st, Half marathon
2009 - Tilburg, 1st, 10 km
2010 - Rotterdam, 1st, marathon (10th overall in Rotterdam Marathon)

== Personal bests ==
Distance	Mark	Date	Location
10 km	33:09	14 February 2010	Schoorl
15 km	51:43	18 November 2012	Nijmegen
20 km	1:12:32	8 October 2006	Debrecen
Half marathon	1:14:21	17 March 2007	The Hague
Marathon	2:35:05	14 November 2012	Eindhoven
