= Tesfayohannes Mesfin =

Eritrean long-distance runner

Tesfayohannes Mesfin (born November 24, 1974) is an Eritrean runner who specializes in the half marathon and cross-country running.

He has several top-25 placements in global competitions. At the 2004 World Cross Country Championships he finished 22nd in the long race and also won a bronze medal with the Eritrean team. He followed up with a 20th place at the 2005 World Cross Country Championships and a ninth place at the 2006 World Cross Country Championships. He finished 21st at the 2004 World Half Marathon Championships, 12th at the 2005 World Half Marathon Championships (team silver medal) and 21st at the 2006 World Road Running Championships (team silver medal). In track competitions he has a sixth place from the 10,000 metres at the 2006 African Championships.

He also placed more lowly at the 2002 World Cross Country Championships, the 2003 World Cross Country Championships, the 2003 World Half Marathon Championships, the 2009 World Championships and the 2010 World Cross Country Championships. He competed but did not finish the 2008 Olympic maraton.

His personal best times are 13:27.06 minutes in the 5000 metres (Seville, 2006); 28:19.88 minutes in the 10,000 metres (Bambous, 2006); 1:03:08 hours in the half marathon (Edmonton, 2005) and 2:12:17 hours in the marathon (Hamburg Marathon, 2008).

He was born in Mendefera in Eritrea and now lives in Bodø, Norway.
