= Terumi Asoshina =

Japanese long-distance runner (born 1982)

Terumi Asoshina (阿蘇品照美; born 2 August 1982) is a Japanese long-distance runner who specializes in the half marathon.

She finished twelfth at the 2005 World Half Marathon Championships, which was good enough to help Japan finish third in the team competition.

== Personal bests ==
- 5000 metres - 15:22.51 min (2003)
- 10,000 metres - 31:23.55 min (2005)
- Half marathon - 1:09:54 hrs (2005)
