= Norman Dlomo =

South African long-distance runner

Norman Dlomo (born 18 April 1975 in Vereeniging, Gauteng) is a South African long-distance runner.

Dlomo finished tenth at the 2005 World Half Marathon Championships. He competed in the marathon at the 2007 World Championships, but did not finish the race.

== Achievements ==
Year	Competition	Venue	Position	Event	Notes
Representing South Africa
2005	World Half Marathon Championships	Edmonton, Canada	10th	Half Marathon	1:02:45
2007	World Championships	Osaka, Japan	—	Marathon	DNF

== Personal bests ==
- 3000 metres - 8:04.16 min (2002)
- 5000 metres - 13:32.47 min (2002)
- 10,000 metres - 28:54.19 min (2006)
- Half marathon - 1:02:24 hrs (2005)
- Marathon - 2:11:47 hrs (2007)
