= Yoko Yagi =

Japanese long-distance runner (born 1980)

Yoko Yagi (born 14 April 1980) is a Japanese long-distance runner.

She finished fourteenth at the 2005 World Half Marathon Championships, which was good enough to help Japan finish third in the team competition.

== Personal bests ==
- 5000 metres - 15:51.45 min (2004)
- 10,000 metres - 32:09.95 min (2005)
- Half marathon - 1:10:06 hrs (2006)
