= María José Pueyo =

Spanish marathon runner

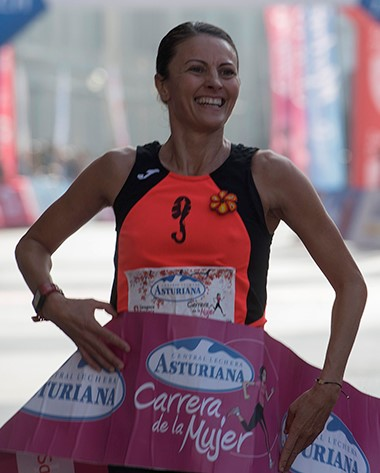

Personal information
- Full name: María José Pueyo Bergua
- Nationality: Spain
- Born: 16 March 1970 (age 56) Jaca, Huesca, Spain
- Height: 1.74 m (5 ft 8 1/2 in)
- Weight: 56 kg (123 lb)

Sport
- Sport: Athletics
- Event: Marathon
- Club: Zenit Olimpo
- Coached by: Jose Fernando García

Achievements and titles
- Personal best: Marathon: 2:32:22 (2008)

María José Pueyo Bergua (born March 16, 1970, in Jaca, Huesca) is a Spanish marathon runner. At age thirty-eight, Pueyo made her official debut for the 2008 Summer Olympics in Beijing, where she competed in the women's marathon, along with her compatriots Alessandra Aguilar and Cuban-born Yesenia Centeno. She finished the race in sixty-fourth place by thirty-one seconds ahead of Hungary's Petra Teveli, with a time of 2:48:01.
