= Wilson Kebenei =

Kenyan long-distance runner

Wilson Kiprotich Kebenei (born 20 July 1980) is a Kenyan long-distance runner. He is a Nandi by ethnicity.

He finished eighth at the 2004 World Half Marathon Championships. At the 2006 World Road Running Championships he finished third in the individual competition. This was good enough to help Kenya win a gold medal in the team competition.

Among his victories on the circuit are the Stramilano Half Marathon and Giro di Castelbuono in 2005, and victories at the World's Best 10K in Puerto Rico and Philadelphia Half Marathon in 2006. He was also fourth at the Beijing Marathon that year.

== Personal bests ==
- Half marathon - 1:00:11 hrs (2005)
- Marathon - 2:12:44 hrs (2006)
