= Antonello Petrei =

Italian long-distance runner

Personal information
- National team: Italy (1 cap in 2006)
- Born: 24 November 1972 (age 53) Avezzano, Italy

Sport
- Country: Italy
- Sport: Athletics
- Event: Long-distance running

Achievements and titles
- Personal bests: Half marathon: 1:03:08 (2003); Marathon: 2:15.20 (2007)

Antonello Petrei (born 24 November 1972) is a former Italian male long-distance runner who competed at individual senior level at the IAAF World Half Marathon Championships.
