= Ruth Kutol =

Kenyan marathon runner (born 1973)

Ruth Jepkoech Kutol (born 16 May 1973) is a Kenyan long-distance and marathon runner. She won the 2000 Venice Marathon, 2003 Madrid, Venice and Dublin Marathons, 2007 Luxembourg Marathon, and 2010 Tallinn Marathon.

== Personal life ==
Kutol is from Eldoret, Kenya. She has six sisters and two brothers, and also has 2 daughters.

== Career ==
Kutol won the Marseille-Cassis Classique Internationale in 1998, one second off the course record. At the 2000 World Cross Country Championships she finished tenth in the long race, while the Kenyan team of which Kutol was a part won the silver medal in the team competition.

In 2000, Kutol won the Venice Marathon, the first competitive marathon that she had run. In 2001, Kutol came second in a 5.65 km (3.51 mi) race in San Sebastián, Spain. In the same year, she came second in the Paris Marathon, losing in a sprint by one second to fellow Kenyan Florence Barsosio.

In 2003, Kutol won the Madrid and Venice Marathons. Later in the year, she won the Dublin Marathon in a record time of 2:27.22, which was over five minutes faster than her previous best. Her record time stood until 2010, when it was beaten by Russian Tatyana Aryasova. In 2004, Kutol won the Paris Half Marathon in a time of 1:11:13.

Kutol took a two-year break from competition in order to have a baby, and returned in 2007. In that year, she won the Luxembourg Marathon in a time of 2:41:26. In 2010, Kutol won the Tallinn Marathon. In 2011, she came third at the Kuala Lumpur Marathon. In 2012, she came 21st overall and second woman at the February Bangkok Marathon, which had been postponed from 2011 due to flooding.

== Achievements ==
Year	Competition	Venue	Position	Event	Notes
Representing Kenya
1998	Marseille-Cassis Classique Internationale	Marseille, France	1st	Half Marathon	1:10:33
2000	Venice Marathon	Venice, Italy	1st	Marathon	2:28.16
2001	Paris Marathon	Paris, France	2nd	Marathon	2:27:54
2003	Madrid Marathon	Madrid, Spain	1st	Marathon	2:34:41
2003	Dublin Marathon	Dublin, Ireland	1st	Marathon	2:27:22
2004	Paris Half Marathon	Paris, France	1st	Half marathon	1:11:13
2007	Luxembourg Marathon	Luxembourg	1st	Marathon	2:41:26
