= Lishan Yegezu =

Ethiopian long-distance runner (born 1985)

Lishan Yegezu Fanta (born 6 October 1985) is an Ethiopian long-distance runner who specializes in the half marathon.

He finished thirteenth at the 2005 IAAF World Half Marathon Championships. He thereby helped Ethiopia win a gold medal in the team competition.

His personal best time is 1:01:42 hours, achieved in August 2005 in Addis Ababa.
