= Stefania Benedetti =

Italian long-distance runner

Personal information
- National team: Italy (1 cap in 2006)
- Born: 6 September 1969 (age 56) Alzano Lombardo, Italy

Sport
- Country: Italy
- Sport: Athletics
- Event: Long-distance running

Achievements and titles
- Personal best: Half marathon: 1:12:57 (2006)

Stefania Benedetti (born 6 September 1969) is a former Italian female long-distance runner who competed at individual senior level at the IAAF World Half Marathon Championships.
