= James Mwangi Macharia =

Kenyan long-distance runner

James Mwangi Macharia (born 23 June 1984) is a Kenyan long-distance runner.

He finished seventh at the 2005 World Half Marathon Championships, which was good enough to help Kenya finish fifth in the team competition. He competed in the marathon at the 2007 World Championships, but did not finish the race.

== Achievements ==
Year	Competition	Venue	Position	Event	Notes
Representing Kenya
2005	World Half Marathon Championships	Edmonton, Canada	7th	Half Marathon	1:02:25
2007	World Championships	Osaka, Japan	—	Marathon	DNF

== Personal bests ==
- 1500 metres - 3:40.00 min (2006)
- 3000 metres - 7:56.19 min (2004)
- 5000 metres - 13:28.47 min (2004)
- 10,000 metres - 27:49.2 min (2009)
- Half marathon - 1:00:34 hrs (2008)
- Marathon - 2:08:20 hrs (2011)
