= Gishu Mindaye =

Ethiopian long-distance runner

Gishu Mindaye (born August 18, 1986) is an Ethiopian long distance track, and road running athlete.

Gishu won the 2006 Rotterdam Marathon on April 9 beating Helena Javornik and Isabel Elizmendi after 2:28:30, breaking away from Javornik passing the 35 km mark. In September that year she returned to Rotterdam taking part in the 1/2 Marathon. Gishu finished second behind Mara Yamauchi finishing almost two minutes earlier.

== Achievements ==
- All results regarding marathon, unless stated otherwise

Year	Competition	Venue	Position	Notes
Representing Ethiopia
2005	Frankfurt Marathon	Frankfurt, Germany	6th	2:33:05
2006	Rotterdam Marathon	Rotterdam, Netherlands	1st	2:28:30
2006	Amsterdam Marathon	Amsterdam, Netherlands	7th	2:33:07
2008	Paris Marathon	Paris, France	8th	2:30:20
2008	Amsterdam Marathon	Amsterdam, Netherlands	6th	2:35:51
2010	Luxembourg Marathon	Luxembourg	1st	2:39:56
