= Merrecia James =

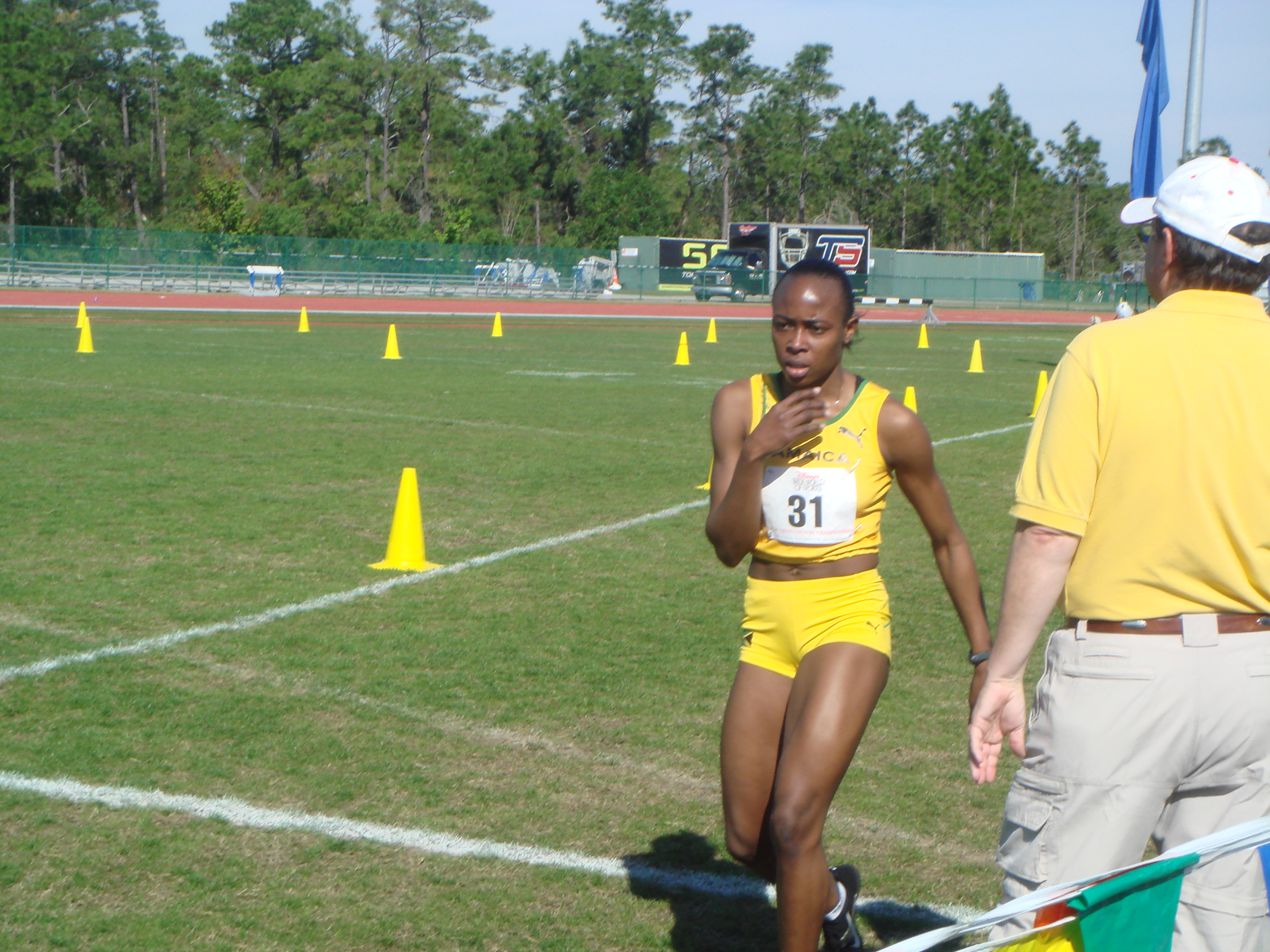

Personal information
- Nickname: Merr Merr (MJ) (Man-head:High school soccer nickname)
- Nationality: Jamaican-American
- Born: September 16, 1985 (age 40) Portland, Jamaica
- Education: University of Maryland Eastern Shore / Malcolm XC/ St. Francis University, liberty University
- Height: 5 ft 5 in (165 cm)
- Weight: 125 lb (57 kg; 8 st 13 lb)

Sport
- Sport: Track and field
- Position: middle distance

Merrecia James (born September 16, 1985) is a track and field middle distance athlete, competed collegiately for the University of Maryland Eastern Shore. She is the daughter of Merle Stewart and William James of Jamaica. She has seven half brothers and five half sisters. She represented Jamaica at the North American Central American Caribbean cross country meet in 2004, 2005 and 2006, winning the bronze medal, in 2005 the world half marathon championships in Edmonton Canada and in 2006 the world cross country championship in Fukuoka, Japan. She finished 2nd for Jamaica at the Central American Caribbean reggae half marathon in a time of 1:28:08. In her mid-twenties, James was in Chicago when she was introduced to The Church of Jesus Christ of Latter-day Saints. She was baptized soon afterward.

== Early life and career ==
James was raised by a single parent in the rural community of Portland, Jamaica. She attended Port Antonio High School, where she earned 9 CXC's in a variety of subjects and earned a scholarship to G.C. Foster college. In college, she earned a certificate in Physical Education in 2006. Also in 2006, she was admitted, with the intent to pursue a degree in Exercise Science and Physical Therapy, to the University of Maryland Eastern Shore on a full athletic scholarship, where she has achieved success as a middle distance runner. As a Maryland, she consistently placed 1st in cross-country, 800 m, 1500 m, mile, and 5000 m races in the Mid-Eastern Athletic Conference, as well as qualifying for Division I NCAA national indoor and outdoor championships in 2007–2008. Additionally, she was a COSIDA All-American in 2007 for her academic and athletic achievements. In 2013, James graduated with a Masters of Medical Science in Physician Assistant from St. Francis University.

== Major achievements ==
Year	Competition	Event	Result
2006	MEAC Cross-Country Championship	5000 m	2nd
2006	Division I Mid Atlantic Region Cross Country Championship	6000 m	59th
2007	MEAC Indoor Championships	3000 m	1st
2007		mile	1st
2007		800 m	1st
2007	MEAC Outdoor Championships	5000 m	1st
2007		1500 m	1st
2007		800 m	1st
2007	Division I East Regional	800 m	11th
2007	MEAC Cross-Country Championships	5000 m	1st
2007	Division I Mid-Atlantic Regional Cross Country	6000 m	49th
2008	MEAC Indoor Championships	mile	1st
2008		3000 m	1st
2008		800 m	1st
2008	MEAC Outdoor Championships	5000 m	1st
2008		1500 m	1st
2008		800 m	2nd
2008	Division I East Regional	800 m	5th
2008	NCAA Outdoor Championships	800 m	11

== Personal bests ==
Cross-country
Year	Event	Result
2007	6000 m	21:49
2008	5000 m	17:50

Indoor
Year	Event	Result
2008	800 m	2:07.18
2008	mile	5:00.44
2008	3000 m	10:06

Outdoor
Year	Event	Result
2008	800 m	2:06.49
2009	1500 m	4:32.64
2007	5000 m	17:41.11
