= Alex Malinga =

Ugandan long-distance runner

Alex Malinga (born 1974) is an Ugandan marathon runner. He was born in Bukwo District.

He finished sixth at the 2005 World Championships, in a national record of 2:12:12 hours.

He also competed at the 2000 Olympic Games, finishing in 57th place. At the 2007 World Championships he finished twelfth.

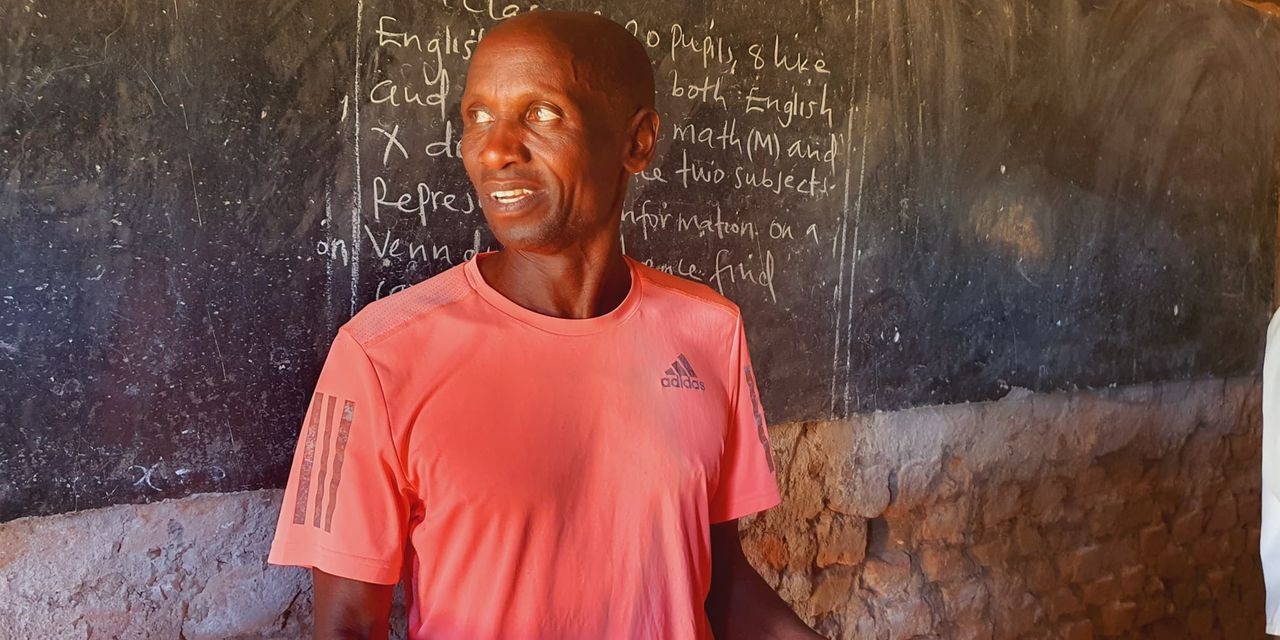
Malinga in his school after retiring from long distance running

== Achievements ==
- All results regarding marathon, unless stated otherwise

Year	Competition	Venue	Position	Notes
Representing Uganda
2000	Olympic Games	Sydney, Australia	57th	2:24:53
2005	World Championships	Helsinki, Finland	6th	2:12:12
2007	Luxembourg Marathon	Luxembourg	1st	2:17:17
2007	World Championships	Osaka, Japan	12th	2:20:36
2008	Olympic Games	Beijing, PR China	31st	2:18:26
