= The Outlaw (1953 film) =

- Directed by: Mehdi Besharatian
- Written by: Mehdi Besharatian
- Production company: Honar Film
- Release date: 6 January 1953
- Running time: 90 minutes
- Country: Iran
- Language: Persian

The Outlaw (Persian: Yaghi) is a 1953 Iranian film directed by Mehdi Besharatian.

== Bibliography ==
- Mohammad Ali Issari. Cinema in Iran, 1900-1979. Scarecrow Press, 1989.
