= Natalya Kurbatova =

Russian long-distance runner

Natalya Kurbatova (Russian: Наталья Курбатова; born 17 October 1985) is a Russian long-distance runner who specializes in marathon races.

She finished thirteenth at the 2006 World Road Running Championships, helping the Russian team take a fifth place in the team competition.

Her personal best time in the half marathon is 1:11:05 hours, achieved in September 2006 in Saransk. In the marathon she has 2:33:43 hours, achieved in June 2006 in Saransk.
