= Ryosuke Yagi =

Japanese baseball player

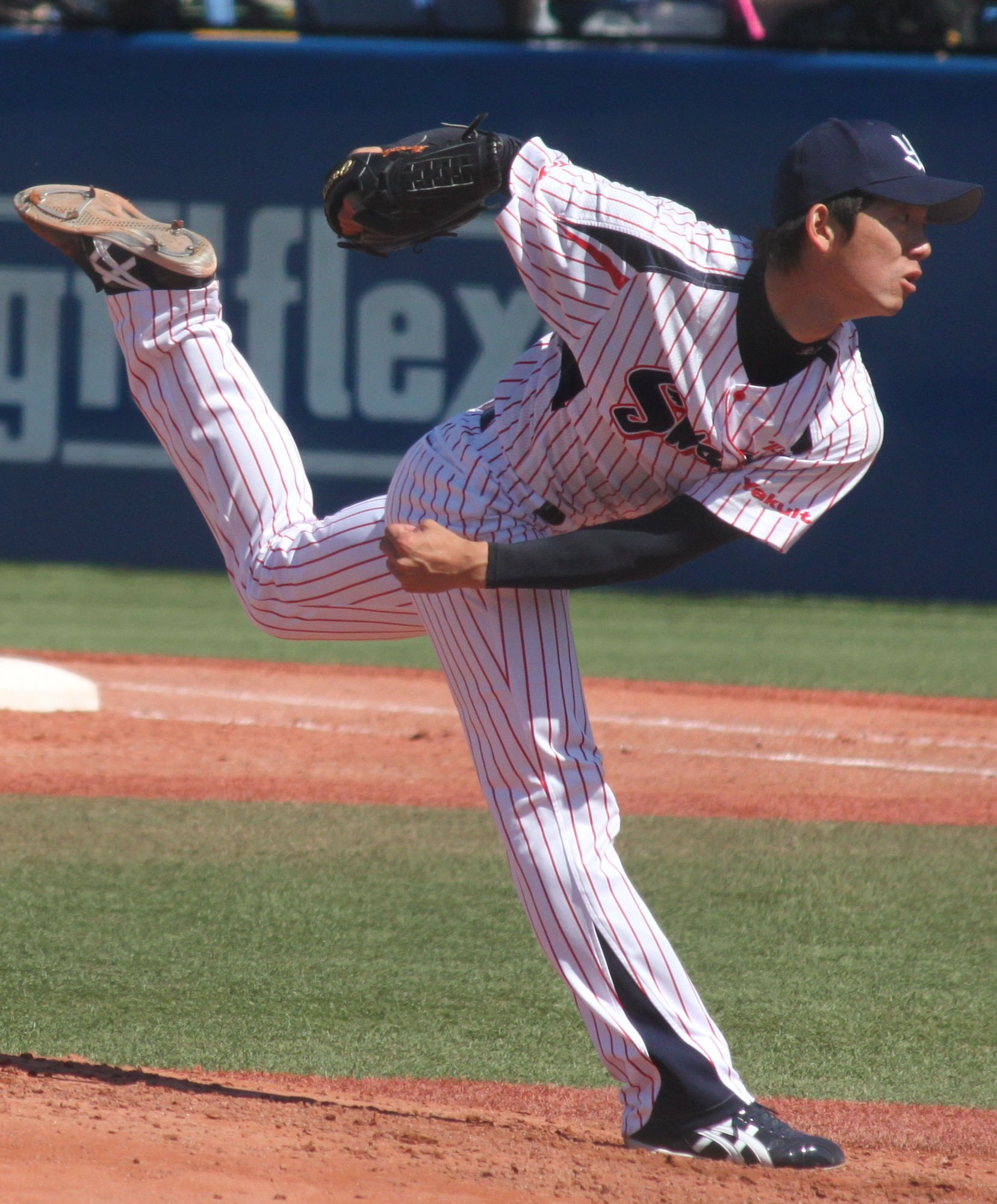
- Pitcher
- Born: July 31, 1990 (age 35); Tsushima, Aichi, Japan
- Bats: Left Throws: Left

debut
- August 4, 2012, for the Tokyo Yakult Swallows
- Stats at Baseball Reference

Teams
- Tokyo Yakult Swallows (2009–2016); Orix Buffaloes (2016–2017)

Ryosuke Yagi (八木 亮祐, Yagi Ryōsuke; born September 29, 1990 in Tsushima, Aichi Prefecture, Japan) is a professional Japanese baseball player. He plays pitcher for the Orix Buffaloes.
