= African Mountain Running Championships =

Mountain running competition

- Sport: Mountain running
- Founded: 2009
- Continent: Africa (CAA)

The African Mountain Running Championships was an annual Mountain running competition organized by the CAA for athletes representing the countries of its member associations. The event was established in 2009 and ceased in 2014.

== Editions ==
	Year	City	Country	Date
I	2009	Obudu Ranch Park, Cross River State	Nigeria	November 28
II	2010	Obudu Ranch Park, Cross River State	Nigeria	November 27
III	2011	Obudu Ranch Park, Cross River State	Nigeria	November 28
IV	2012	Obudu Ranch Park, Cross River State	Nigeria	November 17
V	2013	Obudu Ranch Park, Cross River State	Nigeria	November 23
VI	2014	Obudu Ranch Park, Cross River State	Nigeria	November 8

== Results ==
Complete results were published.

== See also ==
- World Mountain Running Championships
- European Mountain Running Championships
- NACAC Mountain Running Championships
- South American Mountain Running Championships
