= Great Eastern Run =

Running event in Peterborough, UK

- Great Eastern Run Logo
- Date: October (Annually)
- Location: Peterborough, United Kingdom
- Event type: Road
- Distance: Half marathon
- Course records: 1:01:40 (men); 1:11:52 (women)

The AEPG Great Eastern Run is a running event that takes place every year in Peterborough, United Kingdom, generally in mid-October. The event returned in 2006 after a 10-year absence and is rapidly gaining popularity. Currently, there are three races in the whole event:

Half Marathon – A 21.0975-kilometre (13.1094 mi) race which winds its way through the city's streets.

Fun run – A 5 km run which starts and finishes at the same place as the half marathon.

Wheelchair Race – This follows the same route as the half marathon.

Despite its name, the Great Eastern Run is not a part of the Great Run series of events, which includes the Great North Run.

== History of the Event ==
The first Great Eastern Run took place in 1982, boasting only a half marathon. The event was much less popular and well-known than it is today. This format existed until 1996, when the half marathon ceased and was replaced with two different events: A 10km run around the East of England Showground and a shorter race known as the Arthur Bowden 5. With so few events, the run became less and less popular and gradually deteriorated into almost nothing.

However, the Great Eastern Run was relaunched in 2006 with the half marathon returning as the main event, much to the delight of keen runners across the country. Roughly 3,000 runners took part in the whole event. A prize list of roughly £11,000 was announced, taking the race into the top five in the country for total prize money. Perkins Engines announced it would sponsor the 2006 race – the deal has been so successful that the company still sponsors the Great Eastern Run today. At the 2006 England Athletics East Region Awards, the Great Eastern Run's committee (consisting of Peterborough City Council, Perkins Engines and local running clubs) won the Athletics Partnership of the Year Award.

Due to the success of the 2006 event, the Great Eastern Run took place again in 2007, with well over 3,000 runners taking part. 2,285 people managed to complete the half marathon. The number of entrants for the event increased by 20%, with the number of fun runners almost doubling. In a poll of the readers of Runner's World magazine, the Great Eastern Run achieved a top 50 rating out of 736 races across the United Kingdom.

The 2008 event again saw an increase in the number of entrants, with approximately 4,450 runners taking to the streets of Peterborough.

Roughly 3,480 runners took part in the half marathon of the 2009 event, with about 1,300 people competing in the fun run. For the first time, the fun run was chip timed and was advertised as being 4 km in length (in previous years it had been advertised as 5 km). All three races were started by Barry Fry, the director of football at Peterborough United.

The 2010 event was unique because it took place at a time and date consisting purely of the number 10. The half marathon started at 10 seconds past 10:10, with the date being 10/10/10. Record numbers of runners took part, though the event was overshadowed by the deaths of two runners in the half marathon. Detective Constable Rob Davys collapsed during the race and was taken to Peterborough District Hospital. Despite the efforts of paramedics, he was later pronounced dead. A local runner named Matthew Ward (a teacher) also collapsed shortly after the race – he too was pronounced dead at the hospital. These were the first fatalities in the Great Eastern Run since the event was relaunched in 2006. The high temperatures meant that in total, 15 people required medical attention.

The 2011 was another record year with over 4,100 entering the Perkins Great Eastern Run. The winner, Edwin Kiptoo, completed the flat course in 62mins 28sec. Liz Yelling created a record by being the quickest woman, completing the course in 72mins 14secs.

In 2012 the Perkins Great Eastern Run, took place on 14 October and was one of only five runbritain Grand Prix races as well as being a UK Championship race.

In 2013 the Perkins Great Eastern Run, which took place on 13 October, reached a record number entries, which was beaten in 2016 when 4262 runners ran the half-marathon and 1257 people took part in the Anna’s Hope Fun Run. Organisers reported that at one stage during the event more than 10,000 people were in the crowds on The Embankment as runners crossed the finish line. In 2017, numbers declined very slightly with 4193 finishers in the half-marathon.

The 2019 half-marathon was cancelled owing to a major incident on the course.

The event was revived in 2022 with new organisers. Perkins stopped sponsoring the event., and AEPG sponsored the 2023 event which was started by England's most successful Olympian, Sir Jason Kenny, who also ran the event, finishing in 1hr 48m 28.1s.

== Route ==
The route is very flat, with a rise of only 13 metres. All events start and finish on The Embankment beside the River Nene. The half marathon and wheelchair race then follow the same route. A full route map is available online at http://www.perkinsgreateasternrun.co.uk The fun run route is 5k, only running as far Princes Gardens before heading down Eastfield Road and the same finishing straight as the half marathon.

== Past winners ==
=== Original Race ===
Edition	Date	Men's winner	Time (h:m:s)	Women's winner	Time (h:m:s)
1st	1982	John Offord		Celia Hargrave	
2nd	1983	Mike Exton		Celia Hargrave	
3rd	1984	Keith Best		Karen Fulgum	
4th	1985	Ian Thompson		Karen Fulgum	
5th	1986	Laurie Reilly		Annette Bell	
6th	31 May 1987	Angus Kindley & Tony Green	1:05:59	Celia Findley	1:20:41
7th	1988	Gary Spring		Tina Lazenby	
8th	1989	Giovanni Rizzo		Gillian Castka	
9th	1990	Giovanni Rizzo		Gillian Castka	
10th	1991	Giovanni Rizzo		Annette Bell	
11th	1992	Giovanni Rizzo		Sue Baker	
12th	1993	Wayne Buxton		Teresa Dyer	
13th	1994	Daniel Shungea		Teresa Dyer	
14th	1995	Steve Brace		Mandy Ayling	

=== New Race ===
Edition	Date	Men's winner	Time (h:m:s)	Women's winner	Time (h:m:s)
1st	15 Oct 2006	John Mutai (KEN)	1:04:35	Cathy Mutwa (KEN)	1:12:58
2nd	14 Oct 2007	Raymond Tanui (KEN)	1:03:48	Jo Wilkinson (GBR)	1:14:32
3rd	12 Oct 2008	William Chebon (KEN)	1:02:57	Jo Wilkinson (GBR)	1:12:36
4th	11 Oct 2009	Neil Addison (GBR)	1:07:32	Jo Wilkinson (GBR)	1:13:40
5th	10 Oct 2010	Edwin Kipyego (KEN)	1:02:16	Edith Cheline (KEN)	1:13:33
6th	9 Oct 2011	Edwin Kiptoo (KEN)	1:02:26	Liz Yelling (GBR)	1:12:14
7th	14 Oct 2012	Luka Rotich (KEN)	1:02:25	Emily Biwott (KEN)	1:12:29
8th	13 Oct 2013	Nicholas Kirui (KEN)	1:03:59	Purity Kimetto (KEN)	1:11:52
9th	13 Oct 2014	Jonah Chesum (KEN)	1:03:36	Perendis Lekapana (KEN)	1:12:40
10th	11 Oct 2015	Philip Koech (KEN)	1:01:40	Lenah Jerotich (KEN)	1:13:02
11th	9 Oct 2016	Shadrack Kimining Korir (KEN)	1:03:38	Teresiah Omosa (KEN)	1:15:06
12th	8 Oct 2017	Tom Evans (GBR)	1:08:40	Georgina Schwiening (GBR)	1:15:26
13th	14 Oct 2018	Lucian Allison (GBR)	1:05:27	Amy Clements (GBR)	1:14:09
	13 Oct 2019	Cancelled due to Police attending incident on course			
	2020	Cancelled due to COVID 19			
	2021	Cancelled due to COVID 19			
14th	16 Oct 2022	Logan Smith	1:05:55	Nina Griffith	1:15:58
15th	15 Oct 2023	Joe Wilkinson (GBR)	1:06:23	Mabel Beckett (GBR)	1:17.05

=== Winners of the Wheelchair Race ===
- 2007: Marc Poolman United Kingdom 0:47:41
- 2008: Rob Wickham United Kingdom 0:40:05
- 2009: Brian Alldis United Kingdom 0:53:23
- 2010: Matthew Clarke United Kingdom 1:01:33
