= Biwott =

Biwott is a surname of Kenyan origin that may refer to:

- Amos Biwott (born 1947), former Kenyan steeplechase runner and 1968 Olympic champion
- Emily Biwott (born 1984), Kenyan road running athlete
- Gideon Biwott (born 1964), retired Kenyan 400 metres hurdler
- Nicholas Biwott (born 1940), Kenyan businessman and politician
- Paul Biwott (born 1978), Kenyan marathon runner
- Simon Biwott (born 1970), former Kenyan marathon runner and 2002 Paris Marathon winner
- Stanley Biwott (born 1986), Kenyan marathon runner and 2012 Paris Marathon winner
- William Biwott Tanui (born 1990), Kenyan middle-distance runner competing for Turkey as İlham Tanui Özbilen
- Yusuf Biwott (born 1986), Kenyan middle- and long-distance track runner

== See also ==
- Kibiwott, related name meaning "son of Biwott"
