= Angela Allen =

Angela Allen may refer to:

- Angela Allen, member of Carmen (band)
- Angela Allen, see 2009 Plymouth child abuse case
- Angela Allen (script supervisor), winner of the 2005 BAFTA Outstanding British Contribution to Cinema Award
- Angela Allen, women's winner of the 1996 Stroud Half Marathon

== See also ==
- Angela Allen-Bell, American activist scholar
