= Karen MacLeod =

British long-distance runner (1958–2021)

Karen Nicolson née MacLeod
Personal information
- Nationality: British (Scottish)
- Born: 4 April 1958 Skye, Scotland
- Died: 8 June 2021 (aged 63)

Sport
- Sport: Athletics
- Event: long distance
- Club: Edinburgh AC

Karen Margaret Anne Nicolson (née MacLeod; 4 April 1958 – 8 June 2021) was a British long-distance runner. She represented Great Britain running the marathon at the 1996 Summer Olympics and 1993 World Championships in Athletics. She also represented her native Scotland in the 1994 Commonwealth Games marathon.

== Biography ==
Karen MacLeod grew up on Skye. After leaving Skye she came late into athletics, at the age of 24 running in the Bath Half Marathon to raise funds for cancer research, from which her father had died.

MacLeod finished third behind Sue Crehan in the 10,000 metres event at the 1985 WAAA Championships and took part in the world cross-country championships in 1985, 1986 and 1987. In 1987 she won the Scottish National cross-country Championship.

MacLeod ran the 10,000m at the 1990 Commonwealth Games finishing 12th in a race won by compatriot Liz McColgan. She then switched to the longer distance of marathon and enjoyed success in the early 1990s by winning the Bordeaux Marathon, Majorca Marathon and Seville Marathon. In the 1991 Carpi Marathon she finished 12th behind British athletes Andrea Wallace and Marian Sutton, and in the 1992 London Marathon she finished 22nd again behind Wallace and Sutton but also Julia Gates. These performances earned her a place at the 1993 World Championships in Athletics in which she finished 16th and only two minutes behind first Briton Marian Sutton.

In 1994 MacLeod represented Scotland in the Commonwealth Games marathon in Victoria, running a personal best of 2:33:16 finishing fourth and less than a minute behind Yvonne Danson. She was selected for the 1996 Summer Olympics in Atlanta, with Liz McColgan and Suzanne Rigg, finishing 45th in a time of 2:42:08, despite at 38 years being one of the oldest in the field.

MacLeod became an athletics coach, coaching the Skye runner Hugh Campbell.

In 2008, MacLeod revealed that she was suffering from Berger's disease, an acute kidney problem, and had to undergo emergency dialysis, eventually she had to receive a kidney transplant from her sister Deborah.

She died on 8 June 2021, at the age of 63.

== Competition record ==
Year	Competition	Venue	Position	Event	Notes
Representing Great Britain and Scotland
1988	Reading Half Marathon	Reading, United Kingdom	1st	Half marathon	1:14:09
1990	Commonwealth Games	Auckland, New Zealand	12th	10,000m	34:24.71
1991	Bath Half Marathon	Bath, United Kingdom	1st	Half marathon	1:13:31
1991	Bordeaux Marathon	Bordeaux, France	1st	Marathon	2:38:06
1991	Great Scottish Run	Glasgow, United Kingdom	2nd	Marathon	1:14:22
1991	Carpi Marathon	Carpi, Emilia-Romagna, Italy	12th	Marathon	2:37:54
1991	Mallorca Marathon	Calvia, Spain	1st	Marathon	2:38:45
1992	London Marathon	London, United Kingdom	22nd	Marathon	2:41:35
1993	Seville Marathon	Seville, Spain	1st	Marathon	2:34:30
1993	Bristol Half Marathon	Bristol, United Kingdom	1st	Half marathon	1:15:00
1993	World Championships in Athletics	Stuttgart, Germany	16th	Marathon	2:41:46
1993	Stroud Half Marathon	Stroud, United Kingdom	1st	Half marathon	1:13:19
1994	Commonwealth Games	Victoria, Canada	4th	Marathon	2:33:16 (PB)
1994	Stroud Half Marathon	Stroud, United Kingdom	1st	Half marathon	1:13:52
1995	Bath Half Marathon	Bath, United Kingdom	1st	Half marathon	1:14:17
1996	Summer Olympics	Atlanta, United States	45th	Marathon	2:42:08
