= Bronwen Cardy-Wise =

British long-distance runner

Bronwen Wise née Cardy
Personal information
- Nationality: British (English)
- Born: 26 January 1952 (age 73) Redditch, England, UK

Sport
- Sport: Athletics
- Event: Long-distance running
- Club: Bromsgrove & Redditch Athletic Club

Bronwen Wise née Cardy (born 26 January 1952) is a British retired long-distance runner. She competed in the half marathon for Britain at the 1993 IAAF World Half Marathon Championships and was a regular winner of British half marathons during the 1980s and 1990s.

== Biography ==
Cardy was a member of Bromsgrove & Redditch Athletic Club and finished second behind Joyce Smith in the 3,000 metres event at the 1971 WAAA Championships.

She won many British domestic races during the eighties and nineties which led in 1993 to selection for the IAAF World Half Marathon Championships. In a British team which included Suzanne Rigg, Marian Sutton, Sue Dilnot, Teresa Dyer she finished 59th in a time of 1:16:33.

Cardy-Wise continued running in Masters athletics competition taking part in the 2001 World Masters Athletics Championships in Brisbane while working as a Prison officer. She came second in the W45 1500m in 4:56.24, winning both the 5000m in 17:34.37 and 10000m in 36:20.10.

== Road Racing competition record ==
Year	Competition	Venue	Position	Event	Notes
Representing United Kingdom
1987	Wilmslow Half Marathon	Wilmslow, United Kingdom	1st	Half Marathon	1:15:31
1988	Stroud Half Marathon	Stroud, United Kingdom	1st	Half marathon	1:14:24
1988	1988 European Marathon Cup	Huy, Belgium	38th	Marathon	2:55:12
1989	Bath Half Marathon	Bath, United Kingdom	1st	Half Marathon	1:15.20
1989	Great Bristol Half Marathon	Bristol, United Kingdom	1st	Half Marathon	1:20.05
1989	Stroud Half Marathon	Stroud, United Kingdom	1st	Half marathon	1:15:22
1990	Paddock Wood Half Marathon	Paddock Wood, United Kingdom	1st	Half marathon	1:17:12
1991	Lake Vyrnwy Half Marathon	Lake Vyrnwy, United Kingdom	1st	Half marathon	1:16.45
1992	Lake Vyrnwy Half Marathon	Lake Vyrnwy, United Kingdom	1st	Half marathon	1:15.40
1992	Stroud Half Marathon	Stroud, United Kingdom	1st	Half marathon	1:15:26
1993	World Half Marathon Championships	Brussels, Belgium	59th	Half Marathon	1:16:33
1998	Stroud Half Marathon	Stroud, United Kingdom	1st	Half marathon	1:19:15
1999	Hastings Half Marathon	Hastings, United Kingdom	1st	Half Marathon	1:22.01
1999	Lake Vyrnwy Half Marathon	Lake Vyrnwy, United Kingdom	1st	Half marathon	1:18.34
1999	Stroud Half Marathon	Stroud, United Kingdom	1st	Half marathon	1:18:04
