= Kibiwott =

Kibiwott, or Kibiwot, is a name of Kenyan origin meaning one born during heavy rains "iwot ". It may refer to:

- Francis Kibiwott Larabal (born 1978), Kenyan road runner and 2012 Nagano Marathon winner
- Kibiwott Munge (born c. 1994), Kenyan politician
- Viola Kibiwot (born 1983), Kenyan middle- and long-distance runner

== See also ==
- Kibiwatt, a unit of power equal to 1024 watts
