= Sheila Boyde =

British long-distance runner

Sheila Boyde née Catford
Personal information
- Nationality: British (Scottish)
- Born: 29 August 1960 (age 65)

Sport
- Sport: Athletics
- Event: long-distance
- Club: Leeds Athletic Club

Sheila Janet Kathleen Boyde (née Catford; born 29 August 1960) was a British long-distance runner, who competed at the 1990 Commonwealth Games.

== Biography ==
Boyde joined Leeds Athletic Club and trained with Angie Pain and Veronique Marot. In September 1987 she announced herself by finishing as first female in the Glasgow Marathon in a time of 2:37:31. A year later, again in Glasgow, she won the Great Scottish Run half marathon in 72:49 and in 1989 an 11th place in the London Marathon sealed her place in the Scottish team for 1990 Commonwealth Games.

In 1990 Boyde represented Scotland, with compatriot Lynn Harding, in the Commonwealth Games and finished in 9th place. A year later she won the Florence Marathon and represented Britain in the 1991 World Marathon Cup which was run as part of the London Marathon.

Since Retiring Boyde has coached Harrogate athletes.

== Competition Record ==
Year	Competition	Venue	Position	Event	Notes
Representing Scotland and United Kingdom
1987	Glasgow Marathon	Glasgow, United Kingdom	1st	Marathon	2:37:31
1988	Berlin Marathon	Berlin, Germany	2nd	Marathon	2:33:44
1988	London Marathon	London, United Kingdom	12th	Marathon	2:38:18
1988	Great Scottish Run	Glasgow, United Kingdom	1st	Half Marathon	1:12:49 (PB)
1989	London Marathon	London, United Kingdom	11th	Marathon	2:33:04 (PB)
1990	Commonwealth Games	Auckland, New Zealand	9th	Marathon	2:43:48
1990	London Marathon	London, United Kingdom	23rd	Marathon	2:36:42
1991	Stroud Half Marathon	Stroud, United Kingdom	1st	Half marathon	1:14:34
1991	World Marathon Cup	London, United Kingdom	53rd	Marathon	2:43:50
1991	Florence Marathon	Florence, Italy	1st	Marathon	2:35:37
