= Bristol + Bath Marathon =

Annual marathon in United Kingdom

- Logo of the 2015 edition of the race
- Date: October
- Location: Bristol and Bath, United Kingdom
- Event type: Road
- Distance: Marathon
- Primary sponsor: Sanlam
- Established: 2015; 11 years ago
- Course records: Men's: 2:31:29 (Adam Holland, 2015); Women's: 2:52:50 (Clare Prosser, 2015)
- Website: www.bristolbathmarathon.com
- Participants: 6,500

The Bristol + Bath Marathon was planned to be an annual marathon held between the cities of Bristol and Bath in the United Kingdom. It was held once in 2015 before the events in 2016 and 2017 were both cancelled. No further events were arranged after the 2017 edition.

== Route ==
The course began in Bristol city centre and followed much of the route of the Bristol Half Marathon, passing under the Clifton Suspension Bridge. It then headed eastwards out of the city, following the A431 to Bath, finishing in Royal Victoria Park.

== Cancellations ==
Despite the inaugural race being considered a success, the 2016 edition was cancelled due to the race organisers being unable to secure the road closures necessary for the race to be held safely. The second running of the event was then scheduled for 22 October 2017, but was also cancelled due to "other events and road closure requirements across the cities". No date was set for any events after 2017.

== Past winners ==
Key: Course record

| Edition | Year | Men's winner | Time (h:m:s) | Women's winner | Time (h:m:s) |
|---|---|---|---|---|---|
| 1st | 2015 | Adam Holland (GBR) | 2:31:29 | Clare Prosser (GBR) | 2:52:50 |
| | 2016 | Cancelled | | | |
| | 2017 | Cancelled | | | |
