= Lake Vyrnwy Half Marathon =

- Date: September
- Location: Lake Vyrnwy, Wales
- Event type: Road
- Distance: Half Marathon
- Established: 1988; 38 years ago
- Course records: 1:02:14 (men); 1:12:05 (women)
- Website: lakevyrnwyhalfmarathon.com

The Lake Vyrnwy Half Marathon is an annual half marathon Welsh road running event which takes place around Lake Vyrnwy each September.

== History ==
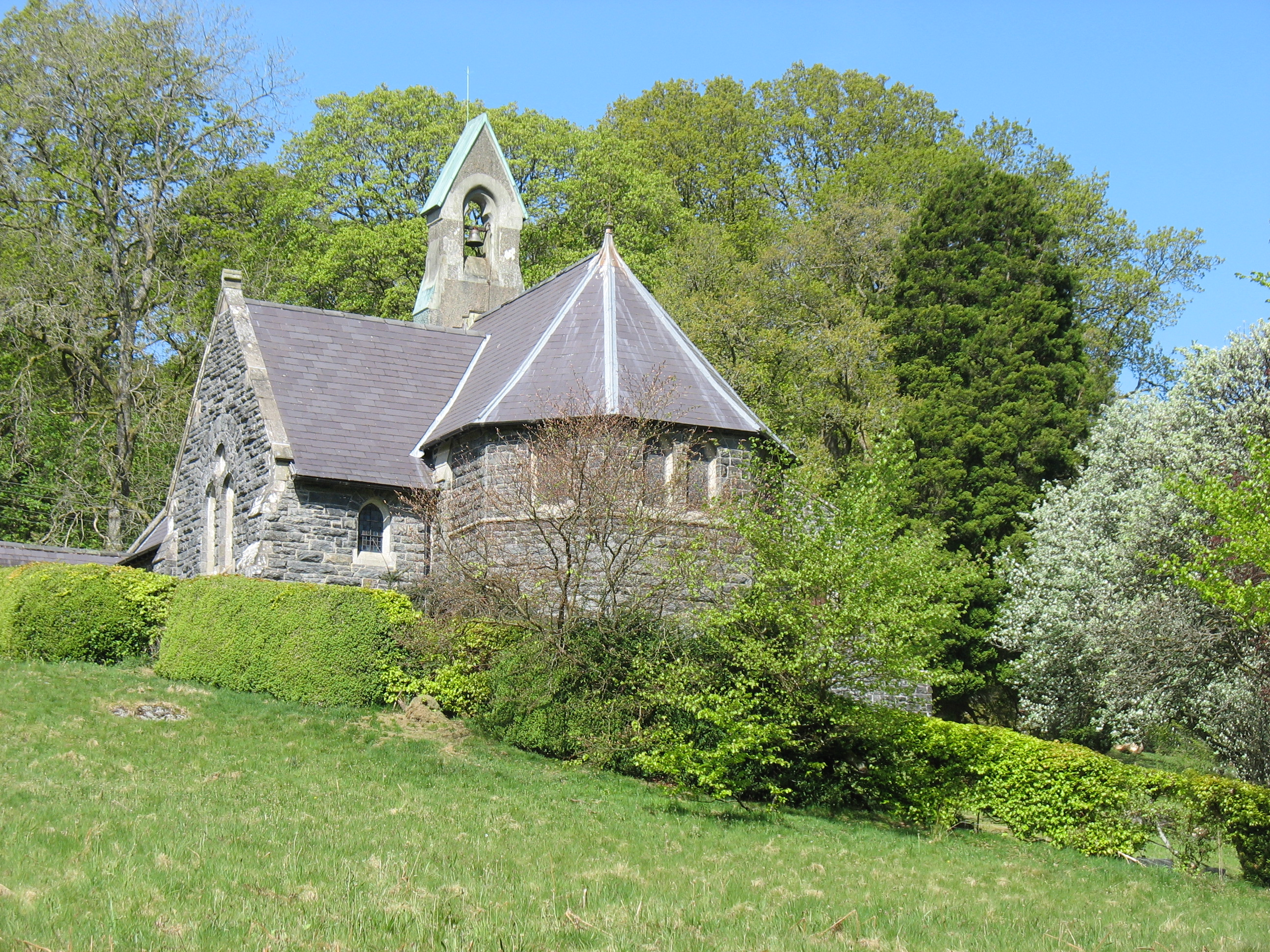
St Wddyn's church, Llanwddyn. This church was built at the time of construction of Lake Vyrnwy reservoir.

The first Lake Vyrnwy Half Marathon was held in 1988 in aid of the St Wddyn's Church Restoration Fund . An appeal to raise money towards the church roof had been placed in a local newspaper and Doug Morris, of the Oswestry Olympians, offered to organise a half marathon for the appeal . The race has been run annually until 2008 when after Doug Morris' death, just before the 2007 edition, the race organisers took a year off before restarting in 2009.

== Course ==
The race consists of just over one lap of the lake.

== Winners ==
Edition	Year	Date	Men's winner	Time (h:m:s)	Women's winner	Time (h:m:s)
31st	2019	8 Sep	Jonathan Mellor	1:04:36	Alison Lavender	1:17:58
30th	2018	9 Sep	Stuart Hawkes	1:06:44	Clara Evans	1:17:59
29th	2017	10 Sep	Jonathan Mellor	1:04:57	Elizabeth Renondeau	1:21:17
28th	2016	11 Sep	Ryan Holroyd	1:07:59	Rachel Jones	1:20:32
27th	2015	13 Sep	Ben Fish	1:07:53	Kelly Crickmore	1:17:12
26th	2014	14 Sep	Alex O'Gorman	1:08:35	Alison Lavender	1:17:00
25th	2013	15 Sep	Ben Fish	1:08:05	Claire Martin	1:19:34
24th	2012	9 Sep	Ben Fish	1:06:50	Alison Lavender	1:20:02
23rd	2011	11 Sep	Ben Fish	1:07:43	Claire Martin	1:18:53
22nd	2010	12 Sep	John McCole	1:08:52	Jenny Clague	1:20:53
21st	2009	13 Sep	Ben Fish	1:06:55	Claire Martin	1:18:53
	2008	No Race				
20th	2007	9 Sep	Paul Sankey	1:11:28	Jenny Clague	1:15:43
19th	2006	10 Sep	Marc Yattich	1:05:31	Cathy Mutwa	1:12:43
18th	2005	11 Sep	Wilfred Taragon	1:02:14	Ogla Kimaiyo	1:12:05
17th	2004	19 Sep	Zachary Kihara	1:04:44	Cathy Mutwa	1:15:53
16th	2003	14 Sep	Onesmus Kilonzo	1:03:04	Pauline Wangui	1:15:00
15th	2002	15 Sep	Eric Kiplagat	1:06:41	Louise Watson	1:17:30
14th	2001	16 Sep	Larry Mathews	1:05:08	Amanda Allen	1:12:43
13th	2000		Nick Jones	1:03:12	Amanda Wright-Allen	1:18:23
12th	1999		Ian Pierce and Tony Graham	1:06:58	Bronwen Cardy-Wise	1:18.34
11th	1998		Joseph Kioo Mitunda	1:04.55	Cath Charnock	1:17.57
10th	1997		Dale Loughlin	1:04.06	Lesley Turner	1:17.48
9th	1996		Tony Graham	1:06.58	Tracy Swindell	1:18.04
8th	1995		Tony O'Brien	1:05.54	Lesley Turner	1:17.07
7th	1994		Steve Brace	1:05.39	Janice Moorekite	1:17.07
6th	1993		Andrew Green	1:04.55	Lesley Turner	1:15.40
5th	1992		Dave Gratton	1:06.00	Bronwen Cardy-Wise	1:15.40
4th	1991		Paul Campbell	1:07.58	Bronwen Cardy-Wise	1:16.45
3rd	1990		Andrew Green	1:04.34	Amanda Wright	1:17.29
2nd	1989		Andrew Green	1:04.16	Janet Witter	1:24.21
1st	1988		Andrew Green	1:07.58	Frances Mudway	1:22.35

== See also ==
- St Wddyn Church, Llanwddyn in Wikimedia Commons
