= Wilmslow Half Marathon =

- Date: Sunday March 15th 2020
- Location: Wilmslow
- Event type: Road
- Distance: Half marathon
- Established: 1984; 42 years ago
- Course records: 1:01:52 (men); 1:10:50 (women)
- Website: https://wilmslowrunningfestival.org.uk/

The Wilmslow Half Marathon is an annual half marathon road running race, established in 1984 and usually run in March as part of the Wilmslow Running Festival.

== Course ==
The race starts to the west of Wilmslow, Cheshire and to the south of Manchester Airport. The course is a single loop and runs through the villages of Morley, Cheshire and Mobberley, finishing near the start. It uses country lanes, which are closed to traffic. It has been described as a 'beautiful Cheshire countryside course that is both fast and flat - a PB course!'

The course was remeasured in 2016 as the same measuring equipment had been used that incorrectly measured the Greater Manchester Marathon.

In 2019, the Wilmslow Half Marathon became part of 'Wilmslow Running Festival' and also included a 10k and Fun Run race.

== Incidents ==
The 2018 edition of the event had to be cancelled due to bad weather. It was rearranged to June.

== Recent winners ==
Key: Course record

| Edition | Year | Date | Men's winner | Time (h:m:s) | Women's winner | Time (h:m:s) |
|---|---|---|---|---|---|---|
| 40 | 2025 | 23 Mar | Robert Mwei (KEN) | 1:02:34 | Sharon Kipchumba (KEN) | 1:10:50 |
| 39 | 2024 | 24 Mar | Dennis Kipkemboi (KEN) | 1:02:29 | Stephie Pennycook (GBR) | 1:13:19 |
| 38 | 2023 | 26 Mar | Jonny Mellor (GBR) | 1:02:06 | Lauren McNeil (GBR) | 1:11:59 |
| 37 | 2022 | 20 Mar | Jonny Mellor (GBR) | 1:04:24 | Anna Bracegirdle (GBR) | 1:13:21 |
| 36 | 2021 | 12 Sep | Philip Sesemann (GBR) | 1:05:18 | Heather Townsend (GBR) | 1:16:09 |
| | 2020 | No Race | | | | |
| 35 | 2019 | 24 Mar | Nigel Martin (GBR) | 1:05:27 | Julie Briscoe (GBR) | 1:17:04 |
| 34 | 2018 | 24 Jun | Mohammad Abu-Rezeq (JOR) | 1:06:44 | Sarah Lowery (GBR) | 1:20:12 |
| 33 | 2017 | 19 Mar | Mohammad Abu-Rezeq (JOR) | 1:06:27 | Fanni Gyurko (HUN) | 1:18:11 |
| 32 | 2016 | 3 Apr | Josephat Kipkemoi (KEN) | 1:04:59 | Teresiah Omosa (KEN) | 1:14:49 |
| 31 | 2015 | 22 Mar | Benjamin Siwa (UGA) | 1:04:57 | Parendis Lekapana (KEN) | 1:11:41 |
| 30 | 2014 | 23 Mar | Mohammad Abu-Rezeq (JOR) | 1:06:01 | Julie Briscoe (GBR) | 1:15:28 |
| 29 | 2013 | 24 Mar | Joe MacDonald (GBR) | 1:04:54 | Julie Briscoe (GBR) | 1:15:15 |
| 28 | 2012 | 25 Mar | Antony Ford (GBR) | 1:04:54 | Catherine Ansell (GBR) | 1:16:53 |
| 27 | 2011 | 27 Mar | Jean-Berchmans Ndayisenga (BDI) | 1:04:24 | Julie Briscoe (GBR) | 1:13:29 |
| 26 | 2010 | 28 Mar | Andi Jones (GBR) | 1:04:45 | Michelle Ross-Cope (GBR) | 1:12:02 |
| 25 | 2009 | 29 Mar | Mark Miles (GBR) | 1:04:11 | Michelle Ross-Cope (GBR) | 1:12:35 |
| 24 | 2008 | 30 Mar | Gareth Raven (GBR) | 1:06:29 | Michelle Ross-Cope (GBR) | 1:12:50 |
| 23 | 2007 | 25 Mar | Tomas Abyu (GBR) | 1:04:24 | Michelle Ross-Cope (GBR) | 1:12:43 |
| 22 | 2006 | 19 Mar | Andrew Norman (GBR) | 1:05:54 | Pauline Powell (GBR) | 1:16:15 |
| 21 | 2005 | 20 Mar | Tomas Abyu (GBR) | 1:06:11 | Sarah Willimott (GBR) | 1:18:26 |
| 20 | 2004 | 21 Mar | Isaac Macharia (KEN) | 1:01:52 | Hawa Hussein (TAN) | 1:13:29 |
| 19 | 2003 | 23 Mar | Julius Kibet Koskei (KEN) | 1:02:23 | Yelena Burykina (RUS) | 1:12:44 |
| 18 | 2002 | 24 Mar | Michael Kosgei Rotich (KEN) | 1:02:57 | Yelena Burykina (RUS) | 1:13:33 |
| | 2001 | No Race | | | | |
| 17 | 2000 | 26 Mar | Nicholas Jones (GBR) | 1:03:51 | Elizabeth Allott (GBR) | 1:13:40 |
| 16 | 1999 | 28 Mar | Nicholas Jones (GBR) | 1:04:00 | Heather Heasman (GBR) | 1:17:00 |
| 15 | 1998 | 29 Mar | Ian Hudspith (GBR) | 1:04:22 | Heather Heasman (GBR) | 1:15:59 |
| 14 | 1997 | 23 Mar | Bashir Hussain (GBR) | 1:05:52 | Catherine Shum (IRL) | 1:15:23 |
| 13 | 1996 | 31 Mar | Eamonn Martin (GBR) | 1:04:32 | Suzanne Rigg (GBR) | 1:12:32 |
| 12 | 1995 | 19 Mar | Andrew Green (GBR) | 1:04:39 | Carol Holmes (GBR) | 1:16:58 |
| 11 | 1994 | 27 Mar | Andrew Green (GBR) | 1:04:51 | Suzanne Rigg (GBR) | 1:14:48 |
| 10 | 1993 | 28 Mar | Bashir Hussain (GBR) | 1:05:28 | Anne Cartwright (GBR) | 1:21:36 |
| 9 | 1992 | 29 Mar | Karl Harrison (GBR) | 1:06:23 | Suzanne Rigg (GBR) | 1:13:42 |
| 8 | 1991 | 14 Apr | L Dunn (GBR) | 1:06:37 | Liz Hardley (GBR) | 1:25:14 |
| 7 | 1990 | 1 Apr | Roger Brewster (GBR) | 1:06:10 | Linda Rushmere (GBR) | 1:15:26 |
| 6 | 1989 | 3 Apr | Tony O'Kell (GBR) | 1:06:51 | SS Drehan (GBR) | 1:20:15 |
| 5 | 1988 | 30 Mar | Dave Locke (GBR) | 1:06:10 | Frances Crozier (GBR) | 1:19:19 |
| 4 | 1987 | 29 Mar | Stephen Forster (GBR) | 1:04:58 | Bronwen Cardy (GBR) | 1:15:31 |
| 3 | 1986 | 6 Apr | Steve Anders (GBR) | 1:04:16 | C Harkin (GBR) | 1:17:03 |
| 2 | 1985 | 31 Mar | Steve Anders (GBR) | 1:05:21 | Susan Catterall (GBR) | 1:22:28 |
| 1 | 1984 | 4 Apr | P Shaw (GBR) | 1:08:41 | CL Modrat (GBR) | 1:26:57 |
