= Tushar Patel =

British wheelchair racer

Tushar Patel (born 1978) is a male wheelchair athlete from the United Kingdom. After contacting polio at an early age, his legs were paralyzed.

Tushar Patel is celebrated by a portrait, photographed by Michael Birt, in the National Portrait Gallery in London.

== Achievements ==
Year	Competition	Venue	Position	Event	Notes
2001	Great North Run	Newcastle upon Tyne, United Kingdom	1st	Half marathon	0:48:10
2002	Reading Half Marathon	Reading, United Kingdom	1st	Half marathon	0:59:22
2002	Great North Run	Newcastle upon Tyne, United Kingdom	1st	Half marathon	0:48:46
2004	Reading Half Marathon	Reading, United Kingdom	1st	Half marathon	0:54:36
2008	Reading Half Marathon	Reading, United Kingdom	1st	Half marathon	0:54:18
