= Julius Kimutai =

Kenyan long-distance runner

Julius Kimtai Rotich (4 April 1974) is a male long-distance runner from Kenya.

He is a two-time winner of the AAA 10 kilometres championships and was runner-up to Paul Tergat at the 2002 Great North Run.

== Achievements ==
Year	Competition	Venue	Position	Event	Notes
2004	Reading Half Marathon	Reading, United Kingdom	1st	Half marathon	1:01:38
2005	Reading Half Marathon	Reading, United Kingdom	1st	Half marathon	1:01:51
