= Athletics at the 1990 Commonwealth Games – Women's marathon =

Women's marathon at the Commonwealth Games

The women's marathon event at the 1990 Commonwealth Games was held in Auckland, New Zealand on 31 January 1990.

== Results ==
Rank	Name	Nationality	Time	Notes
1st place, gold medalist(s)	Lisa Martin	Australia	2:25:28	
2nd place, silver medalist(s)	Tani Ruckle	Australia	2:33:15	
3rd place, bronze medalist(s)	Angela Hulley	England	2:36:35	
4	Sally Ellis	England	2:37:46	
5	Deborah Noy	England	2:39:01	
6	Andri Avraam	Cyprus	2:39.19	
7	Helen Moros	New Zealand	2:39:36	
8	Odette Lapierre	Canada	2:41:36	
9	Sheila Catford	Scotland	2:43:48	
10	Sandra Mewett	Bermuda	2:46:21	
11	Lynn Harding	Scotland	2:47:24	
12	Moira O'Neill	Northern Ireland	2:48:52	
13	Linda Hunter	Zimbabwe	2:52:52	
14	Maryse Pyndian	Mauritius	2:55:50	
-	Marguerite Buist	New Zealand	DNF	
