= David Mungai =

American long-distance runner

David Kimani Mungai (born December 7, 1968) is a Kenyan mid- and long-distance runner.

== Professional career ==
David Mungai traveled from Kenya to attend the University of Wyoming and to train with fellow Kenyas who were coached by Olympian Joseph Nzau. Mungai's coach was an Olympian, accomplished master's runner, and a former top runner at the University of Wyoming. He would often compete along with Mungai and the other runners he coached, such as Kenyan Gideon Mutisya.

In the 1992 Great Bristol Half Marathon, Mungai and his training partner, Mutisya, started what would be a continual back-and-forth racing pattern. As the race went on, the two Kenyans pulled away from their coach and the rest of the pack in a course-record pace. The two teammates, both in their mid-twenties, were shoulder-to-shoulder near the finish and crossed with the same official time: 1:04:08, a course record. Mutisya was declared winner.

In July, the two nearly crossed again at the same time. At the competitive Wharf to Wharf 6-mile in Santa Cruz, California, the duo finished one second apart. In a course-record-breaking day, Mungai finished in 27:40 for fourth, edging out Mutisya. Lameck Aguta, who would later win the Boston Marathon, finished first.

The fall of 1992 brought on two races in Minnesota. The first was in September: the City of Lakes 25K. Again, Mungai and Mutisya dueled for the lead. Mutisya won, with Mungai taking second in 1:19:02.

The teammates returned for the October Twin Cities Marathon, which was also serving as the USATF Master's Marathon Championship, bringing in talent such as Manuel Vera from Mexico and Pierre Levisse from France. The forecast was favorable: from the upper 40s to the mid 60s. Favorites included Mutisya, Olympian Ravil Kashapov, and Mexican Leonardo Reyes, top finisher at the Houston Marathon. Few recognized the 24-year-old Mungai, even though his half-marathon split in the 25K had set an age-group record in Minnesota (that as of January 2021 still stands).

Mungai, Mutisya, Nzua and major-marathon winner William Musyoki formed a front pack around the lakes of Minneapolis. As they crossed the Mississippi River onto Summit Avenue, toward mile-marker 22, Mungai surged ahead of the others. Mungai passed the St. Paul Cathedral and sprinted downhill to finish line near the Capitol building in front; it was clear Mungai would be the winner. He crossed the tape in 2:15:33. The time was faster than the Chicago Marathon winner's time in 1992. Nzau placed second.

In 1993, Mungai ran a 10K personal best at the Crescent City Classic in New Orleans, Louisiana: finishing in 28:58. Later, at the Boston Marathon, which was hot and sunny, he finished in the top 20. The race saw relatively slower times, and another Kenyan, Cosmas Ndeti won. Mungai ran a 2:17:12 for 17th place, a few seconds ahead of Toshihiro Shibutani. Mungai's name was known by the close of 1993, when he ran the Cleveland Marathon. On a redesigned course along the shore of Lake Erie Mungai duked it out with Don Janicki, Russian Nazipov Makhametna, and Canadian Peter Maher to finish fourth in 2:13:40. Janicki, running alone for some of the race, set a new course record (2:11:39) on the cool day.

In the mid-1990s, Nzua was still coaching Mungai, Mutisya, Andrew Musuva and others, but now in Schenectady, New York. They called their themselves Team Stick.

In 1994, Mungai raced the City of Lakes 25K and Twin Cities Marathon again. He scored another second-place win in the competitive 25K, 11 seconds behind John Mirth. Now at the Twin Cities Marathon, Mungai was considered one of the top contenders, along with John Kagwe, St. Louis Marathon-winner Joe Leuchtmann, Rod DeHaven, and the 1984 Olympian John Tuttle. Again Mungai paced the pack through the early miles. But at mile 10, he was vomiting and dropped back from the lead. While Pablo Sierra would win, Mungai finished 14th in 2:19:11.

Later in the year, he had a top-10 finish at the Dallas Marathon

In the late 1990s, Mungai was still a top competitor at large 5K, 10K, and half-marathon races, taking third in the Duke City 5K in 15:10, fifth at the California International Marathon, third at the Phoenix 10K in 29:59, and fourth at the San Diego Marathon in 2:23:29.

== Personal life ==
Mungai has lived in Wyoming and Kenya and trained in Albuquerque, New Mexico, and Schenectity, New York. After meeting Mormon missionaries in New Mexico, he was baptized into their church.

== Achievements ==
Year	Competition	Venue	Position	Event	Notes
1992	Great Bristol Half Marathon	Bristol, England	2nd	Half Marathon	1:04:08
1992	City of Lakes	Minneapolis, Minnesota	2nd	25K	1:19:02
1992	Twin Cities Marathon	Twin Cities	1st	Marathon	2:15:33
1993	Cleveland Marathon	Cleveland, Ohio	4th	Marathon	2:13:40
1994	Heritage Days	Salem, Massachusetts	3rd	10K	30:01
1994	City of Lakes	Minneapolis, Minnesota	2nd	25K	1:19:43
1994	Dallas Marathon	Dallas, Texas	6th	Marathon	2:24:58.5
1997	Duke City Race	Albuquerque, New Mexico	3rd	5K	15:10
1997	California International Marathon	Sacramento, California	5th	Marathon	2:22:34
1997	Phoenix Run	Phoenix, Arizona	3rd	10K	29:59
1997	Run for the Hills	Albuquerque, New Mexico	3rd	10K	31:57
1998	San Diego Marathon	Carlsbad, California	4th	Marathon	2:23:39

citations
