= Reading Half Marathon =

Half marathon road running event held on the streets of the English town of Reading

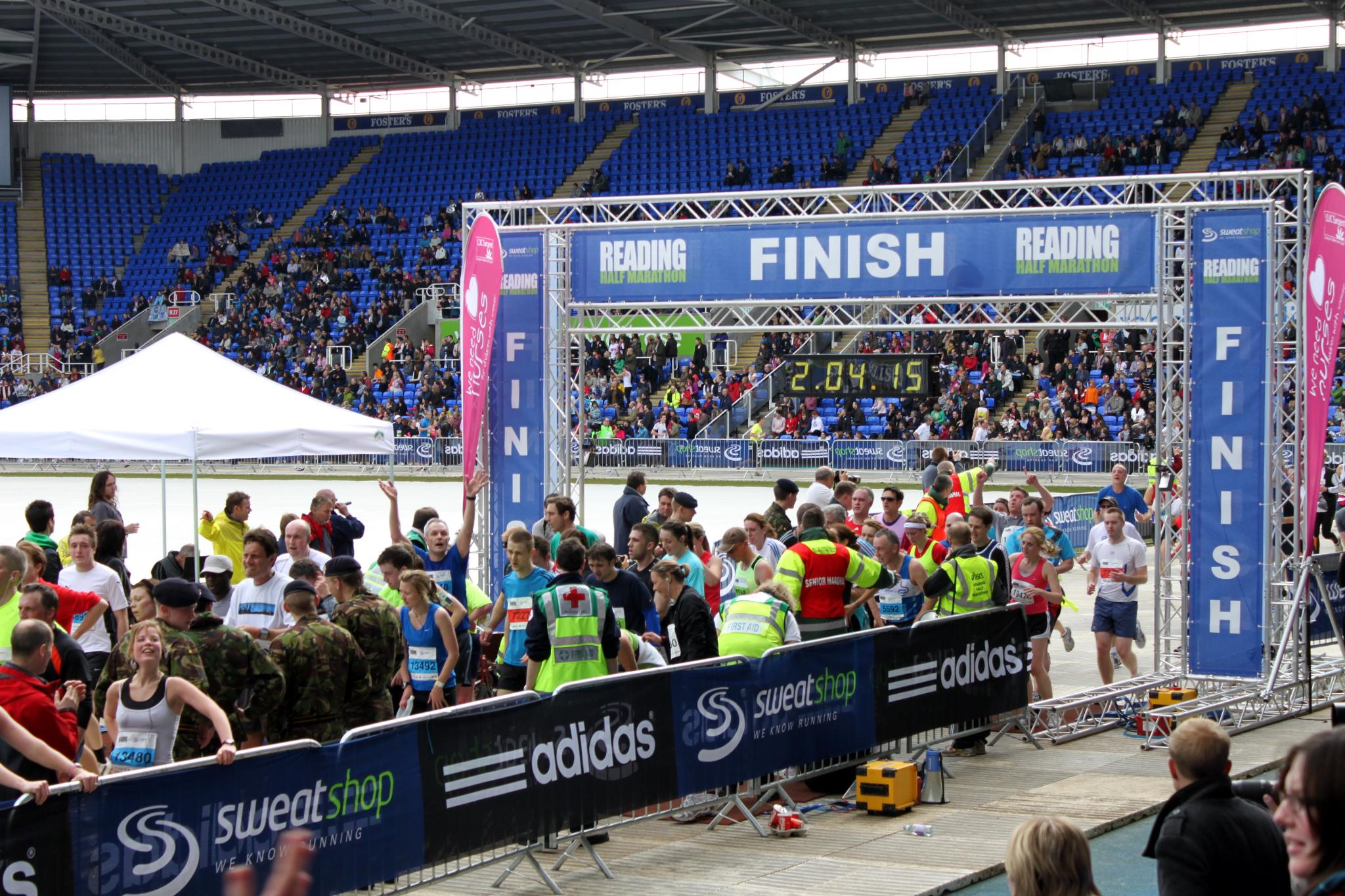
- Finish of the half marathon in 2010 at the Madejski Stadium
- Date: March/April
- Location: Reading, United Kingdom
- Event type: Road
- Distance: Half marathon
- Established: 1983 (43 years ago)
- Website: www.readinghalfmarathon.com

The Reading Half Marathon (currently known as the Unleashed Performance Reading Half Marathon for sponsorship reasons) is a half marathon road running event held on the streets of the English town of Reading, first held in 1983. The race is normally held on a Sunday in March or early April of each year. The race is open to everyone from fun runner to elite athlete, and was one of the first town races to include wheelchair athletes.

The 2024 race was held on 14 April. The 2025 race is scheduled to be held on 23 March.

== History ==
The race was first run on 13 March 1983, and has been run every year since, with the exceptions of 2001, 2018, and 2020. From 2003 to 2018 the race was organised by Sweatshop, the chain of running equipment shops founded by Chris Brasher in 1971. From 2019 the race was organised by Goldline Events, who also organise the Ikano Bank Robin Hood Marathon Events and goGIRL (Brighton & Hove). Since 2021, the race has been sponsored by Unleashed Performance, promoters of fitness centres, nutritional products and performance wear. Previously headline sponsors have included Digital, Asics, Mizuno, Vitality and Sage.

In 2001, the race was cancelled due to restrictions imposed during the 2001 outbreak of foot-and-mouth disease. In 2018, the race was cancelled due to heavy overnight snowfall. The 2020 edition of the race was cancelled due to the coronavirus pandemic, with all entries automatically transferred to 2021 and all registrants given the option of transferring their entry to another runner or to 2022. For similar reasons, the 2021 edition of the race was postponed to November of that year. (Note: The 2020 race was originally due to be held on Sunday 5 April. However on 15 March it was announced that the race had been postponed due to the pandemic. The race was later scheduled for Sunday 1 November before being cancelled.)

== Course ==
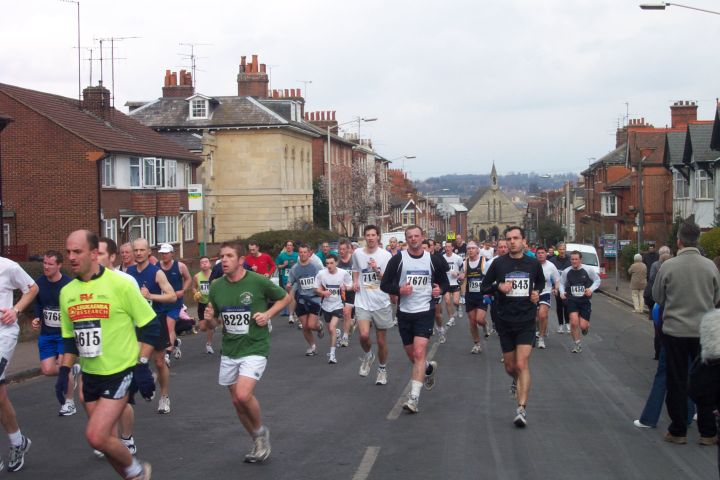
The half marathon climbing Russell Street in West Reading in 2004

The Reading Half Marathon has had several courses over its life. The inaugural race in 1983, and several subsequent races, used University of Reading's Whiteknights Campus for both the start and finish. Other early courses involved use of the South Reading Leisure Centre and the Rivermead Sports Centre, on the banks of the River Thames, as start and/or finish, but recent races have used Green Park Business Park and the adjacent Madejski Stadium, both to the south of Reading, for these purposes.

The current course starts in Green Park Business Park, which it loops before proceeding eastwards through Whitley Wood to the Whiteknights Campus, which lies between the 4-mile (6.4 km) and 5-mile (8.0 km) markers. The route then heads north, passing close to the ruins of Reading Abbey and through the Abbey Gateway, before traversing the town centre between the 6-mile (9.7 km) and 8-mile (13 km) markers. Leaving the town centre by Oxford Road and a steep climb up Russell Street, the course then loops around West Reading until the 11-mile (18 km) marker. The course then heads back south to the Madejski Stadium, where it finishes within the stadium.

== Records ==
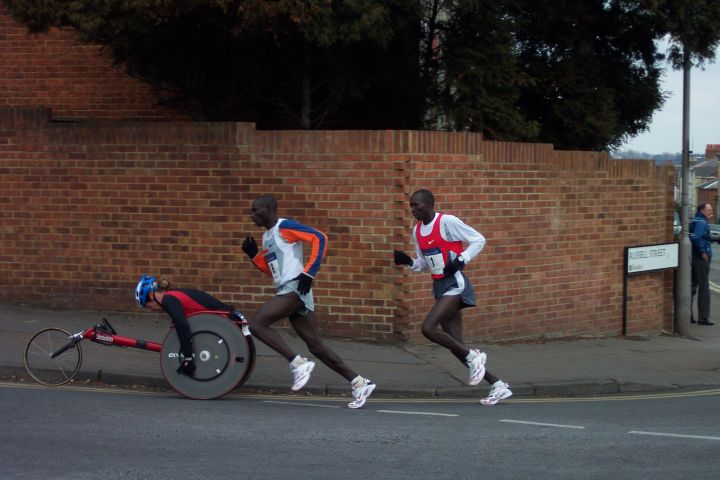
In 2005, Julius Kimutai chases down Malack Olemengera and a wheelchair athlete.

The current male course record is 61 minutes 19 seconds, by Patrick Makau in 2008. The female record is 69 mins 35 seconds, set by Liz Yelling in 2008. The male wheelchair record is 45 minutes 59 seconds, set by David Weir in 2006, while the female wheelchair record is 65 minutes 17 seconds, set by Mel Nicholls in 2015.

== Winners ==
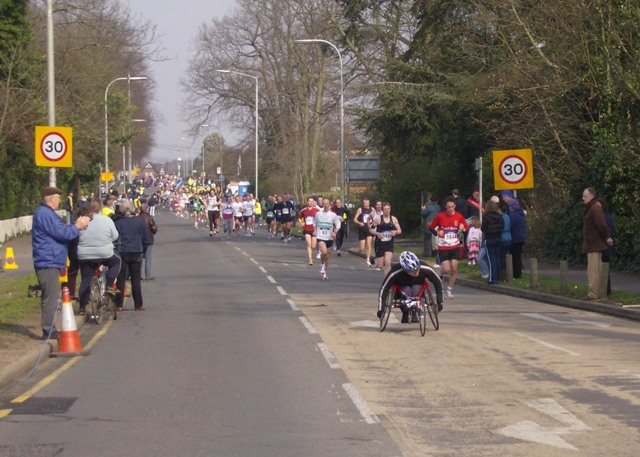
In 2007, the marathon passes down Liebenrood Road.

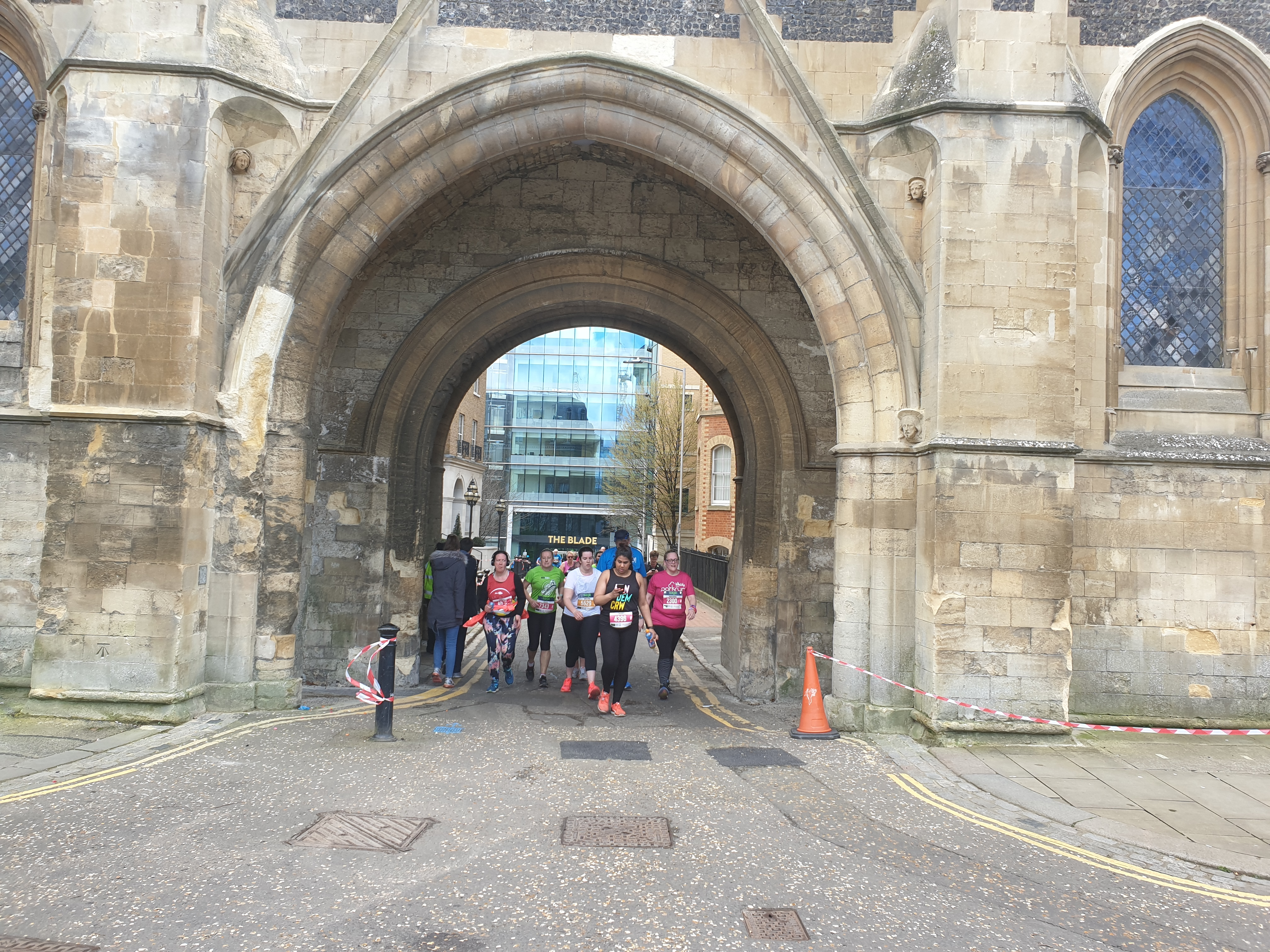
In 2019, the marathon passes through Reading's Abbey Gateway.

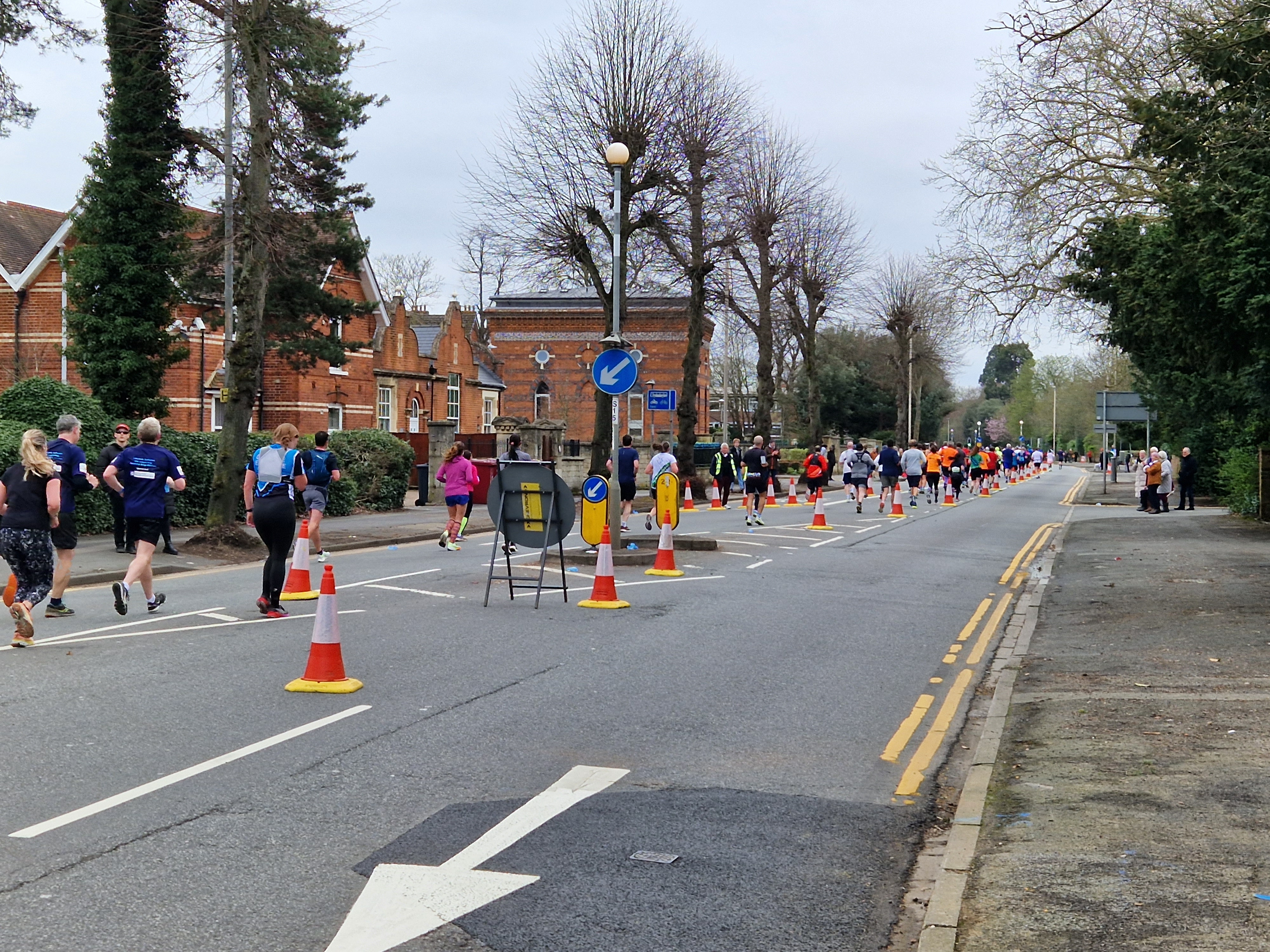
In 2023, the marathon passes along the Bath Road.

| Year | Date | Men's race | Women's race | Men's wheelchair | Women's wheelchair | Rf. |
|---|---|---|---|---|---|---|
| 2024 | 14 April | Ben Cole (1:05:39) | Kate Estlea-Morris (1:14:26) | | | |
| 2023 | 2 April | Ollie Lockley (1:04:35) | Naomi Mitchell (1:12:12) | | | |
| 2022 | 3 April | James Connor (1:05:58) | Kate Drew (1:14:38) | | | |
| 2021 | 7 November | Omar Ahmed (1:02:14) | Philippa Bowden (1:13:29) | | | |
| 2020 | 5 April | postponed then cancelled due to the coronavirus pandemic | | | | |
| 2019 | 17 March | Scott Overall (1:03:50) | Stephanie Twell (1:11:37) | Chris Nash | No starters | |
| 2018 | 18 March | cancelled on the morning of the race due to heavy overnight snowfall | | | | |
| 2017 | 19 March | Andy Vernon (1:03:08) | Charlotte Purdue (1:12:15) | | | |
| 2016 | 3 April | Robert Mbithi (1:03:57) | Jenny Nesbitt (1:12:54) | Gary Donald (1:22:41) | No starters | |
| 2015 | 22 March | Stephen Kiplagat (1:03:10) | Lily Partridge (1:10:32) | No starters | Mel Nicholls (1:05:17) | |
| 2014 | 2 March | Scott Overall (1:04:44) | Susan Partridge (1:12:18) | | | |
| 2013 | 17 March | Andrew Lesuuda (1:04:15) | Emily Biwott (1:12:14) | Phil Hogg (0:59:15) | Jade Jones (1:09:11) | |
| 2012 | 1 April | Edwin Kipyego (1:03:08) | Alice Mogire (1:11:01) | Stephen Lightbown (1:08:59) | Kate Rowe (3:15:35) | |
| 2011 | 20 March | Simon Kasimili (1:03:08) | Edith Chelimo (1:11:22) | David Weir (0:48:18) | No starters | |
| 2010 | 21 March | Edwin Kipyego (1:03:03) | Susan Partridge (1:12:47) | | | |
| 2009 | 29 March | Kiplimo Kimutai (1:02:46) | Joyce Kirui (1:12:49) | Brian Alldis (0:54:37) | No starters | |
| 2008 | 2 March | Patrick Makau (1:01:19) | Liz Yelling (1:09:35) | Tushar Patel (0:54:18) | No starters | |
| 2007 | 25 March | Simon Kasimili (1:03:36) | Louise Damen (1:10:47) | David Weir (0:46:06) | No starters | |
| 2006 | 9 April | Simon Kasimili (1:04:51) | Cathy Mutwa (1:12:10) | David Weir (0:45:59) | | |
| 2005 | 6 March | Julius Kimutai (1:01:51) | Cathy Mutwa (1:13:09) | | | |
| 2004 | 7 March | Julius Kimutai (1:01:38) | Galina Ignatieva (1:14:27) | Tushar Patel (0:54:36) | Shelly Woods (1:06:37) | |
| 2003 | 9 March | Carl Warren (1:06:33) | Catherine Mutua (1:16:42) | | | |
| 2002 | 10 March | Michael Kosgei Rotich (1:03:23) | Andrea Green (1:16:36) | Tushar Patel (0:59:22) | Paula Craig (1:35:03) | |
| 2001 | cancelled due to 2001 outbreak of foot-and-mouth disease | | | | | |
| 2000 | 12 March | Sammy Bitok (1:02:56) | Birhan Dagne (1:14:23) | No starters | Carol Hutchins | |
| 1999 | 14 March | Sammy Nyangincha (1:04:18) | Lyubov Denisova (1:15:18) | | | |
| 1998 | 15 March | James Kuria (1:03:59) | Maria Bradley (1:16:08) | | | |
| 1997 | 16 March | Spencer Duval (1:04:50) | Lucia Subano (1:15:44) | | | |
| 1996 | 31 March | Gary Staines (1:03:31) | Carolyn Horne (1:19:08) | | | |
| 1995 | 30 April | Baha Tulumba (1:04:49) | Kathryn Bailey (1:15:31) | | | |
| 1994 | 10 April | Andrew Leach (1:06:46) | Tanya Maria Ball (1:24:40) | | | |
| 1993 | 28 March | Paul Evans (1:01:38) | Alison Fletcher (1:16:49) | Ian Thompson (0:59:23) | Tanni Grey | |
| 1992 | 26 April | Steve Brace (1:02:20) | Scholasica Ndigingi (1:11:36) | | | (Note: In 1992 the course was shortened by approximately 700 metres due to a bomb-scare.) |
| 1991 | 7 April | Steve Brace (1:04:28) | Celia Duncan (1:18:59 ) | | | |
| 1990 | 1 April | Steve Brace & Nick Trainer (1:03:32) | Angie Pain (1:12:21) | | | |
| 1989 | 2 April | Paul Cuskin (1:04:11) | Marina Sammy (1:13:43) | | | |
| 1988 | 10 April | Paul Cuskin (1:03:16) | Karen MacLeod (1:14:09) | | | |
| 1987 | 5 April | Kevin Forster (1:02:07) | Paula Fudge (1:12:45) | | | |
| 1986 | 6 April | Paul Davies-Hale (1:02:39) | Ann Ford (1:12:09) | | | |
| 1985 | 24 March | Kingston Mills (1:03:55) | Véronique Marot (1:12:56) | Mike Bishop (1:16:31) | | |
| 1984 | 25 March | Michael Hurd (1:04:39) | Karen Holdsworth (1:13:56) | | | (Note: The 1984 course appears to have been short of the full half marathon distance.) |
| 1983 | 13 March | Mark Cursons (1:07:45) | Sarah Rowell (1:16:00) | | | |
