= Fun run =

Friendly running race for enjoyment rather than competition

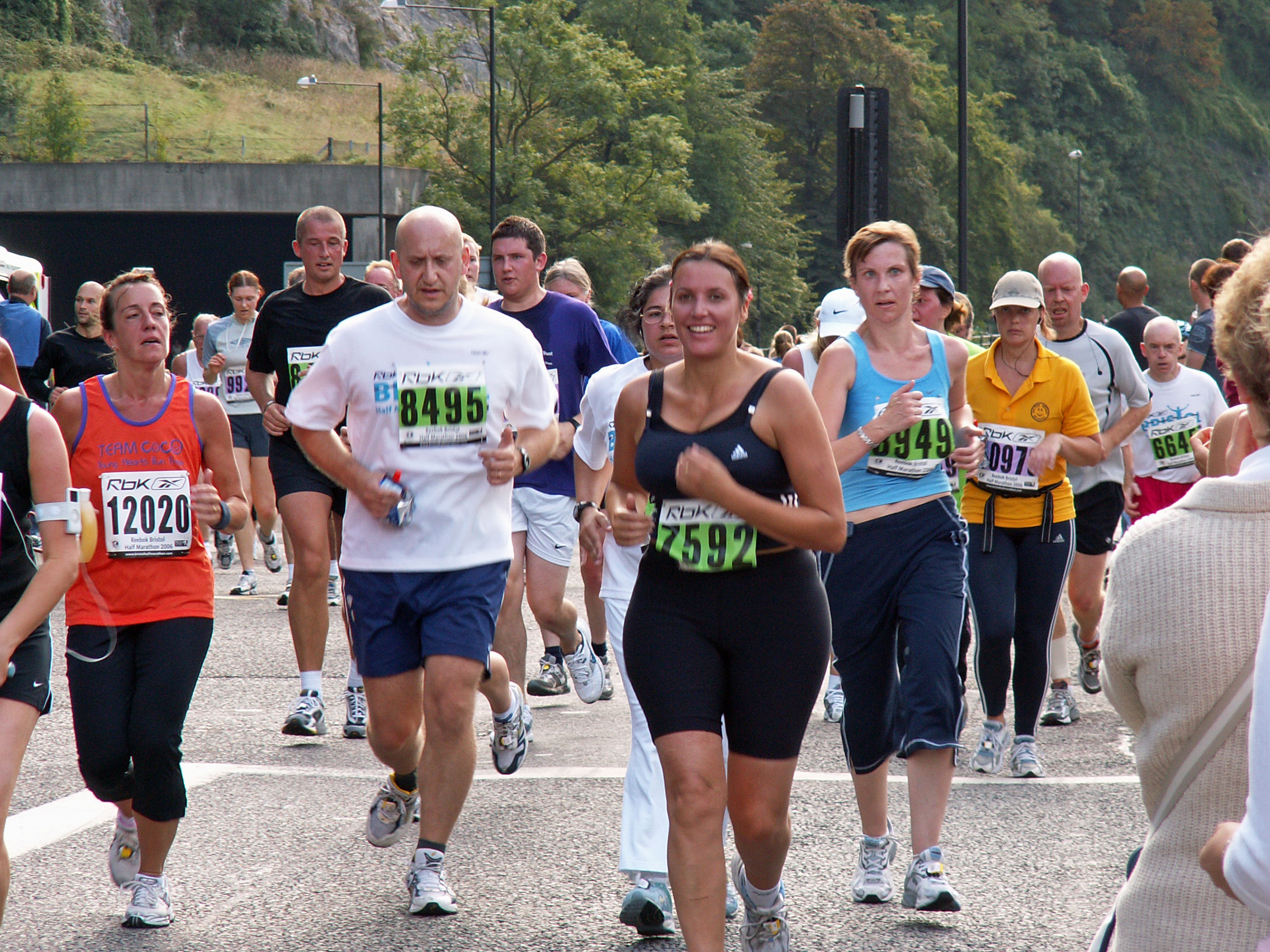
Fun runners taking part in the Bristol Half Marathon

A fun run is a friendly race that involves either road running or cross country running with participants taking part for their own enjoyment rather than competition. A fun run will usually be held to raise funds for a charity, with sponsors providing the revenue to cover organisational costs. Fun runs can include novelty categories, such as wearing costumes, and age categories for child, teen, adult and senior. Fun runs can also be included as a side event to a marathon or other more serious races. Motorcycle, snowmobile, and other motorized vehicle events are also sometimes categorized as "fun runs".

One of the biggest annual fun runs in Europe is "la Cursa El Corte Inglés" in Barcelona, with about 55,000 participants.
