= Wilfred Taragon =

Kenyan long-distance runner (born 1985)

Wilfred Kipkoech Taragon (born 25 February 1985) is a Kenyan long-distance runner.

He finished seventh in 10,000 metres at the 2006 African Championships. At the 2006 World Road Running Championships he finished fifth in the individual competition. This was good enough to help Kenya win the team competition.

In 2005 Taragon won the Bristol Half Marathon, and Lake Vyrnwy Half Marathon

== Personal bests ==
- 3000 metres - 7:47.43 min (2006)
- 5000 metres - 13:21.74 min (2006)
- 10,000 metres - 27:33.02 min (2007)
- Half marathon - 1:00:42 hrs (2007)
