= Helen Moros =

New Zealand long-distance runner

Personal information
- Born: 2 November 1967
- Died: 6 February 2003 (aged 35) Auckland, New Zealand

Sport
- Country: New Zealand
- Sport: Long-distance running
- Event: 1990 Commonwealth Games
- Club: Owairaka

Achievements and titles
- National finals: 10,000 m champion (1993)

Helen Moros (2 November 1967 – 6 February 2003) was a New Zealand long-distance runner. In 1993, she won the 10,000 metres New Zealand national title in Wellington, recording a time of 32:32.24. She competed in the marathon event at the 1990 Commonwealth Games in Auckland, placing seventh. Also in 1990, she placed third and fourth at the Los Angeles and Chicago marathons, respectively. Moros was awarded the New Zealand 1990 Commemoration Medal.

Outside of athletics, Moros was a schoolteacher.

On Waitangi Day 2003, Moros died at age 35 after collapsing at her home in the Auckland suburb of Mount Wellington home. Having lived with anorexia since her adolescence, her death was reported to have been caused by a heart attack. Her funeral was held in Auckland on 10 February 2003.
