= Glynis Penny =

British long-distance runner

Glynis Penny née Goodburn
Personal information
- Nationality: British (English)
- Born: 18 January 1951 (age 74)

Sport
- Sport: Athletics
- Event: middle-distance
- Club: Cambridge Harriers

Glynis Carol Penny née Goodburn (born 28 January 1951) is a retired long-distance runner from England.

== Biography ==
Born Glynis Goodburn, she married Keith Penny in 1974 and competed under her married name thereafter.

Penny finished second behind Penny Yule in the 1500 metres event at the 1976 WAAA Championships and second behind Cherry Hanson at the 1978 WAAA Championships.

Penny set her personal best (2:36:21) in the women's marathon on 17 April 1983, finishing in third place at the 1983 London Marathon.

Penny represented England marathon event, at the 1986 Commonwealth Games in Edinburgh, Scotland.

== International competitions ==
Year	Competition	Venue	Position	Event	Notes
Representing United Kingdom and England
1983	Fleet Half Marathon	Fleet, Hampshire	1st	Half Marathon	1:15:47
1983	London Marathon	London	3rd	Marathon	2:36:21 (PB)
1983	World Championships	Helsinki	—	Marathon	DNS
1985	Stroud Half Marathon	Stroud, United Kingdom	1st	Half Marathon	1:13:52
1986	London Marathon,	London	8th	Marathon	2:38:47
1986	Great North Run	Newcastle upon Tyne, United Kingdom	4th	Half Marathon	1:13:24 (PB)
1986	Commonwealth Games	Edinburgh	9th	Marathon	2:38:47
1986	Berlin Marathon	Berlin, Germany	9th	MArathon	2:41:25
1986	Stroud Half Marathon	Stroud, United Kingdom	1st	Half Marathon	1:16:20
1987	London Marathon	London	14th	Marathon	2:38:23
1988	Vienna Marathon	Vienna, Austria	1st	Marathon	2:36:49
1988	Roma-Ostia Half Marathon	Rome, Italy	1st	Half Marathon	1:15:02
1989	London Marathon	London	26th	Marathon	2:39:37
1990	Belgrade Marathon	Belgrade, Serbia	5th	Marathon	2:52:18
1991	Hastings Half Marathon	Hastings, United Kingdom	1st	Half Marathon	1:18:03
