= Chester Half Marathon =

Annual road run in Cheshire, England

- Date: May
- Location: Chester
- Event type: Road
- Distance: Half marathon
- Established: 1982; 44 years ago
- Course records: 1:02:21 (men); 1:14:32 (women)
- Website: www.activeleisureevents.co.uk/half-marathon

The Chester Half Marathon is an annual road running event held in the city of Chester, United Kingdom.

== History ==
It was first run in 1982 using a route that started and finished at the Chester Racecourse via Blacon, Saughall and Sealand.

In 1993, the race was organised by Chester and Ellesmere Port Athletic Club; they moved the route to the south of the city, going out and back via Eccleston, Belgrave and Pulford. West Cheshire AC took over in 1998 and, in 2012, Active Leisure Events provided the organisation with a new route finishing outside the town hall and Chester Cathedral.

== Past winners ==
| Edition | Year | Date | Men's winner | Time (h:m:s) | Women's winner | Time (h:m:s) |
|---|---|---|---|---|---|---|
| 39 | 2021 | 19 Sep | Jonathan Escalante-Phillips | 1:06:36 | Tracy Barlow | 1:20:13 |
| | 2020 | Edition cancelled due to COVID-19 | | | | |
| 38 | 2019 | 19 May | Mohammed Abu-Rezeq | 1:04:28 | Kirsty Longley | 1:19:03 |
| 37 | 2018 | 29 April | Phillip Matthews | 1:07:59 | Hayley Munn | 1:18:06 |
| 36 | 2017 | 21 May | Mohammed Abu-Rezeq | 1:07:20 | Julie Briscoe | 1:17:06 |
| 35 | 2016 | 15 May | Mark Kangogo | 1:03:58 | Julie Briscoe | 1:17:21 |
| 34 | 2015 | 17 May | Vincent Boit | 1:02:21 | Teresiah Omosa | 1:15:37 |
| 33 | 2014 | 18 May | Mohammed Abu-Rezeq | 1:05:48 | Gemma Connolly | 1:22:20 |
| 32 | 2013 | 12 May | Mohammed Abu-Rezeq | 1:08:07 | Amanda Crook | 1:14:32 |
| 31 | 2012 | 13 May | Robert Baker | 1:09:26 | Emma Parry | 1:20:44 |
| 30 | 2011 | 15 May | John Gilbert | 1:07:28 | Marilyn Kitching | 1:20:48 |
| 29 | 2010 | 16 May | Damian Nicholls | 1:10:55 | Marilyn Kitching | 1:19:16 |
| 28 | 2009 | 17 May | Kenneth Svendsen | 1:13:26 | Nicola Bird | 1:22:40 |
| 27 | 2008 | 18 May | Paul Sankey | 1:11:02 | Marilyn Kitching | 1:24:14 |
| 26 | 2007 | 20 May | Michael Halman | 1:09:58 | Lynne Wright | 1:24:44 |
| 25 | 2006 | 21 May | Nick Leigh | 1:09:41 | Gill Laithwaite | 1:18:15 |
| 24 | 2005 | 22 May | Mike Proudlove | 1:09:05 | Nicola Bird | 1:21:49 |
| 23 | 2004 | 23 May | Mike Proudlove | 1:10:08 | Louise Cooper | 1:23:05 |
| 22 | 2003 | 18 May | Nick Jones | 1:08:26 | Lisa Heyes | 1:15:57 |
| 21 | 2002 | 26 May | Mike Proudlove | 1:07:24 | Helen Lawrence | 1:17:50 |
| 20 | 2001 | 20 May | Jamie Lewis | 1:04:54 | Janet Kenyon | 1:18:53 |
| 19 | 2000 | 21 May | Alan Shepherd | 1:04:36 | Kath Charnock | 1:18:47 |
| 18 | 1999 | 23 May | Alan Shepherd | 1:07:09 | Lynne Maddison | 1:20:28 |
| 17 | 1998 | 24 May | Simon Shiels | 1:07:59 | Lynne Maddison | 1:18:21 |
| 16 | 1997 | 18 May | Alan Shepherd | 1:05:04 | Louise Cooper | 1:25:26 |
| 15 | 1996 | 19 May | Martin McLoughlin | 1:05:12 | Jill McGee | 1:23:31 |
| 14 | 1995 | 30 April | Simon Shiels | 1:08:39 | Lynne Quigley | 1:22:29 |
| 13 | 1994 | 8 May | Jamie Lewis | 1:05:49 | Alison Whitelaw | 1:24:15 |
| 12 | 1993 | 9 May | Tony Power | 1:07:37 | Louise Davies | 1:26:30 |
| 11 | 1992 | 10 May | Tony Power | 1:06:02 | Liz Hardley | 1:24:59 |
| 10 | 1991 | 12 May | Tony Power | 1:06:30 | D Payton | 1:22:55 |
| 9 | 1990 | 3 June | T Holloway | 1:07:35 | Frances Mudway | 1:23:47 |
| 8 | 1989 | 14 May | G Harvey | 1:07:43 | Suzanne Youngberg | 1:16:53 |
| 7 | 1988 | 15 May | Anthony Blackwell | 1:08:30 | Colette Harkin | 1:22:30 |
| 6 | 1987 | 17 May | Steve Brace | 1:05:04 | Colette Harkin | 1:17:32 |
| 5 | 1986 | 18 May | Mark Flint | 1:05:51 | Colette Harkin | 1:17:13 |
| 4 | 1985 | 19 May | Ken Moss | 1:06:00 | Sally-Ann Hales | 1:15:38 |
| 3 | 1984 | 20 May | Stephen Poulton | 1:09:35 | Sally-Ann Hales | 1:16:53 |
| 2 | 1983 | 22 May | Stephen Poulton | 1:09:19 | Sally-Ann Hales | 1:21:16 |
