= Stroud Half Marathon =

- Date: October
- Location: Stroud
- Event type: Road
- Distance: Half marathon
- Established: 1982; 44 years ago
- Course records: 1:01:50 (men); 1:12:31(women)
- Website: www.stroudhalf.com

The Stroud Half Marathon is an annual road running event held in Stroud, United Kingdom.

== Past winners ==
The men's race has been won three times by Paul Cuskin and Stuart Hall,. The women's race has been won five times by Bronwen Cardy-Wise.

Edition	Year	Date	Time (h:m:s)	Men's winner	Time (h:m:s)	Women's winner
40	2022	23 Oct	1:11:24	Lee Stopford	1:23:31	Annabel Granger
39	2021	24 Oct	1:11:51	Lee Stopford	1:26:15	Sarah Hanley
38	2019	27 Oct	1:08:57	Alex Lee	1:16:36	Rachel Felton
37	2018	21 Oct	1:08:05	Andrew Davies	1:17:12	Rachel Felton
36	2017	22 Oct	1:09:43	Philip Bridge	1:23:10	Shona Crombie-Hicks
35	2016	23 Oct	1:10:09	Dave Bell	1:21:01	Annabel Granger
34	2015	25 Oct	1:09:19	Robert Keal	1:19:43	Annabel Granger
33	2014	26 Oct	1:09:08	Andy Greenleaf	1:19:28	Annabel Granger
32	2013	27 Oct	1:05:24	Peter Emase	1:14:17	Purity Kimetto
31	2012	21 Oct	1:03:49	Luka Rotich Lobiwan	1:13:53	Edna Kwambai Kimaiyo
30	2011	23 Oct	1:03:56	Andrew Lesuuda	1:14:54	Edith Chelimo
29	2010	24 Oct	1:06:51	Edwin Kipkorir Kiptoo	1:14:14	Helen Chemutai
28	2009	25 Oct	1:06:08	Neil Renault	1:16:36	Genet Measso
27	2008	26 Oct	1:05:25	Neil Renault	1:15:16	Wendy Nicholls
26	2007	21 Oct	1:06:51	Tendai Williard Chinhanhu	1:15:58	Wendy Nicholls
25	2006	22 Oct	1:04:49	Simon Kasimili	1:16:54	Janet Kangara Njeri
24	2005	23 Oct	1:05:57	Neo Molema	1:18:10	Holly May
23	2004	24 Oct	1:04:11	Zachary Kihara Njoroge	1:16:02	Monica Otwori Gesare
22	2003	26 Oct	1:05:32	Wilson Kogo Kiptoo	1:14:04	Miriam Wangari Kiprugut
21	2002	27 Oct	1:05:09	Aleksandr Vasilyev	1:15:28	Vikki Pincombe
20	2001	28 Oct	1:02:46	George Okworo Onwonga	1:13:56	Andrea Green
19	2000	22 Oct	1:01:50	Laban Kipkemboi Kipsang	1:12:31	Elizabeth Yelling
18	1999	24 Oct	1:07:20	Stuart Hall	1:18:04	Bronwen Cardy-Wise
17	1998	25 Oct	1:06:51	Stuart Hall	1:19:15	Bronwen Cardy-Wise
16	1997	26 Oct	1:06:54	Stuart Hall	1:17:33	Zina Marchant
15	1996	27 Oct	1:07:03	Gareth Davies	1:20:25	Angela Allen
14	1995	22 Oct	1:05:21	Mark Croasdale	1:17:39	Paula Fudge
13	1994	23 Oct	1:06:36	Steve Knight	1:13:52	Karen MacLeod
12	1993	24 Oct	1:05:31	Bruce Chinnick	1:13:19	Karen MacLeod
11	1992	25 Oct	1:05:03	Paul Cuskin	1:15:26	Bronwen Cardy-Wise
10	1991	27 Oct	1:03:43	Mike Cadman	1:14:34	Sheila Catford
9	1990	28 Oct	1:03:57	Paul Cuskin	1:13:38	Zina Marchant
8	1989	29 Oct	1:04:39	Paul Cuskin	1:15:22	Bronwen Cardy-Wise
7	1988	30 Oct	1:03:05	Christopher Buckley	1:14:24	Bronwen Cardy-Wise
6	1987	25 Oct	1:05:46	Robin Nash	1:18:58	Sue Walters
5	1986	26 Oct	1:06:22	Keith Penny	1:16:20	Glynis Penny
4	1985	27 Oct	1:04:48	Michael Fromant	1:13:52	Glynis Penny
3	1984	28 Oct	1:05:01	Christopher Robison	1:22:14	Sue Graham
2	1983	23 Oct	1:06:35	John Broe	n/a	Sally Ellis-McDiarmid
1	1982	24 Oct	1:07:00	Dave Cowles	1:22:25	Sue Walters
