= Kibiwott Munge =

Kenyan politician

Member of the County Assembly for Lembus/Perkera ward in Baringo County
- Incumbent
- Assumed office March 2013
- Majority: 3,333

Personal details
- Born: c. 1994 (age 31–32)
- Party: URP

Kibiwott Munge (born c. 1994) is a Kenyan politician who was elected to represent the Lembus Perkera ward in Baringo town.
