= Steve Brace =

Welsh long-distance runner

Personal information
- Born: 7 July 1961 (age 65) Bridgend, Great Britain

Sport
- Sport: Marathon running

Stephen Brace (born 7 July 1961, in Bridgend) is a former long-distance runner from Wales, who represented Great Britain in the men's marathon at the 1992 and 1996 Summer Olympics. He finished in 27th (2:17:49) and in 60th (2:23.28) place respectively.

Brace triumphed at the Paris Marathon in 1989 and 1990 and at the Berlin Marathon in 1991. His personal best is 2:10:35 (second place at the Houston Marathon 1996).

Brace is currently the Director of Welsh Athletics

== International competitions ==
Year	Competition	Venue	Position	Event	Notes
Representing Great Britain and Wales
1990	Commonwealth Games	Auckland, New Zealand	9th	Marathon	2:16:16
1992	Olympic Games	Barcelona, Spain	27th	Marathon	2:17:49
1994	European Championships	Helsinki, Finland	52nd	Marathon	2:24:21
1996	Olympic Games	Atlanta, United States	60th	Marathon	2:23:28

== Road races ==
Year	Competition	Venue	Position	Event	Notes
1987	Barcelona Marathon	Barcelona, Spain	2nd	Marathon	2:14:33
1987	Chester Half Marathon	Chester	1st	Half Marathon	1:05:04
1988	London Marathon	London, United Kingdom	12th	Marathon	2:12:58
1988	20 km of Brussels	Brussels, Belgium	1st	20 km	59:17
1988	Chicago Marathon	Chicago, United States	6th	Marathon	2:11:50
1989	Paris Marathon	Paris, France	1st	Marathon	2:13:03
1989	Bristol Half Marathon	Bristol, United Kingdom	1st	Half marathon	1:08:36
1990	Reading Half Marathon	Reading, United Kingdom	1st	Half marathon	1:03:32
1990	Paris Marathon	Paris, France	1st	Marathon	2:13:10
1990	New York City Marathon	New York City, United States	3rd	Marathon	2:13:32
1991	Reading Half Marathon	Reading, United Kingdom	1st	Half marathon	1:04:28
1991	London Marathon	London, United Kingdom	7th	Marathon	2:11:45
1991	Berlin Marathon	Berlin, Germany	1st	Marathon	2:10:57
1992	London Marathon	London, United Kingdom	18th	Marathon	2:14:11
1992	Reading Half Marathon	Reading, United Kingdom	1st	Half marathon (shortened course)	1:02:20
1992	New York City Marathon	New York City, United States	10th	Marathon	2:14:10
1993	London Marathon	London, United Kingdom	10th	Marathon	2:14:00
1994	Houston Marathon	Houston, United States	3rd	Marathon	2:14:43
1994	London Marathon	London, United Kingdom	13th	Marathon	2:12:23
1994	Lake Vyrnwy Half Marathon	Lake Vyrnwy, United Kingdom	1st	Half marathon	1:05:39
1996	Houston Marathon	Houston, United States	2nd	Marathon	2:10:35
1996	Belgrade Marathon	Belgrade, Serbia	8th	Marathon	2:15:47
1998	London Marathon	London, United Kingdom	24th	Marathon	2:16:35
