= Edwin Kipyego =

Kenyan long-distance runner (born 1990)

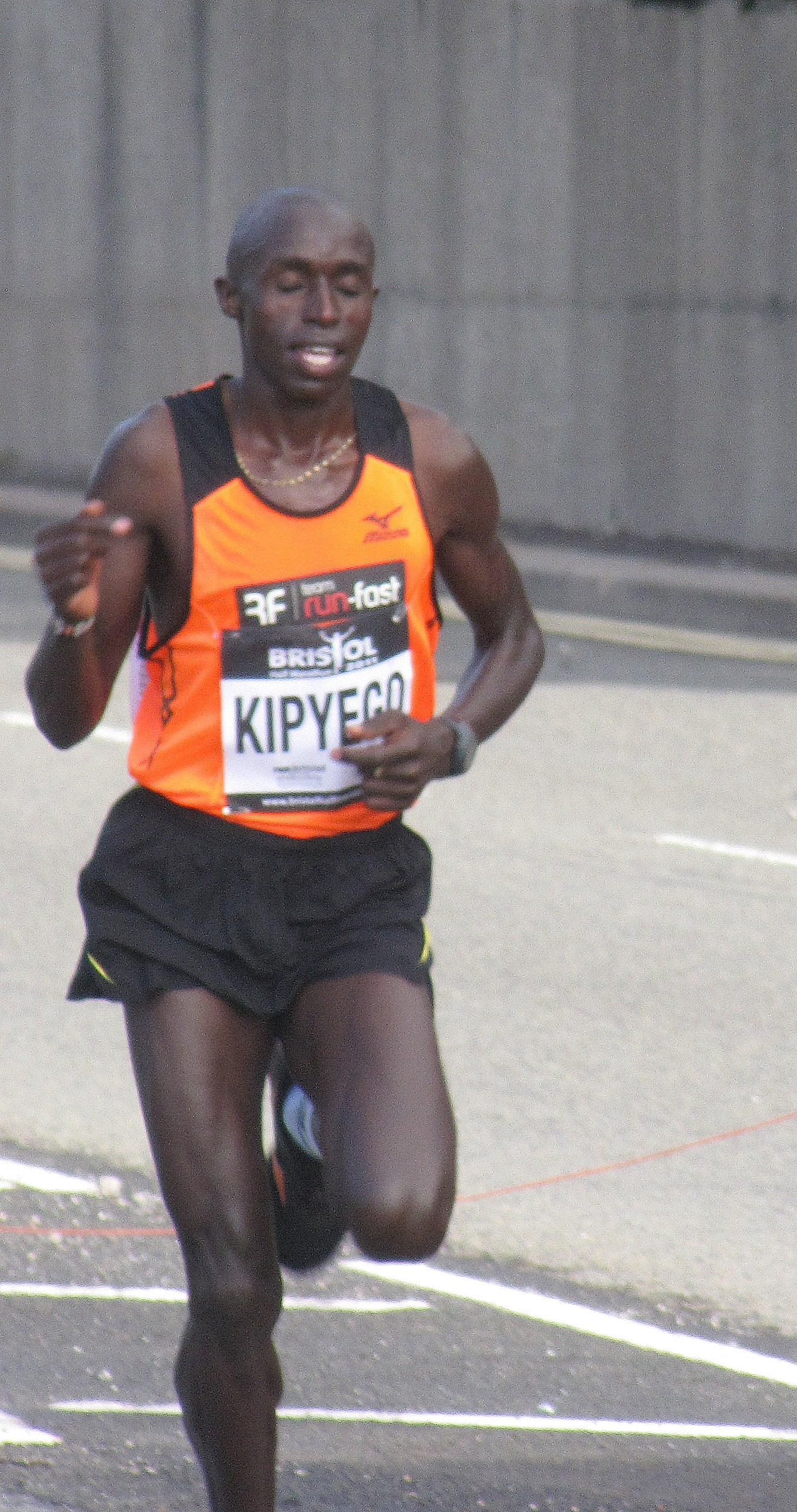
Kipyego at the 2011 Bristol Half Marathon

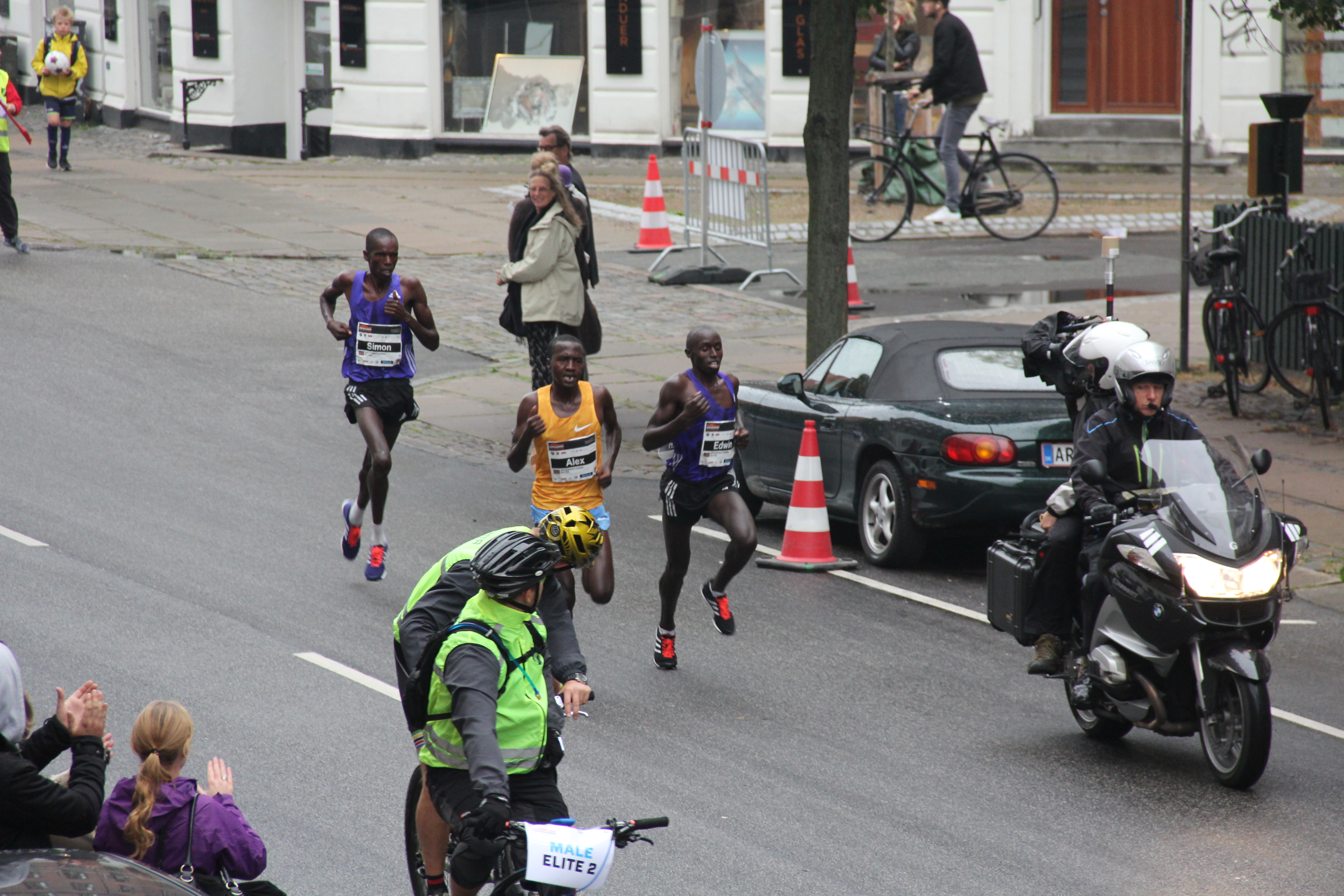
Copenhagen Half marathon Sep 13 2015 at 19.5 with Alex Oloitiptip Korio

Edwin Kipyego (born 16 November 1990) is a Kenyan long-distance runner, best known for a series of victories, at the half marathon and 10K distances, in the United Kingdom and elsewhere. His personal best for the half marathon is 60:05 minutes.

He first began to compete in European road races in 2009 and he placed in the top ten at that year's Hamburg Half Marathon. Having chosen to focus on the half marathon distance, he had his first road race victories in 2010. He won the Reading and Bristol Half Marathons and was runner-up in Cardiff and Nottingham. Moving on from his United Kingdom base, he won the 2011 Ribarroja Del Turia Half Marathon with a personal best of 61:23 minutes. He came close to that mark at the Nice Half Marathon (61:26) and was seventh at the Lille Half Marathon. In his eighth half marathon outing of the year, he retained his title in Bristol in September.

He suffered an injury in October, but on his return in January 2012 he caused an upset at the Kenyan Discovery Half Marathon, beating Emmanuel Mutai and James Kwambai. He improved his best to 61:11 minutes with a runner-up performance at the Lago Maggiore Half Marathon in Italy then had his second career victory at the Reading Half Marathon. Kipyego incorporated 10K races into his schedule the following year and it proved to be a successful move. He won the British 10K London with a time of 27:49 minutes – making him the twelfth fastest in the world that year. His last two outings of the year also brought personal bests: he set a course record of 58:16 minutes at the Marseille-Cassis Classique Internationale and improved to 60:55 minutes to win the Delhi Half Marathon.

Kipyego ran a personal best of one hour five seconds to win the CPC Loop Den Haag in March 2013.
