= Great Bristol Half Marathon =

Half marathon in Bristol, UK

Coordinates: 51.4508°N 2.5986°W

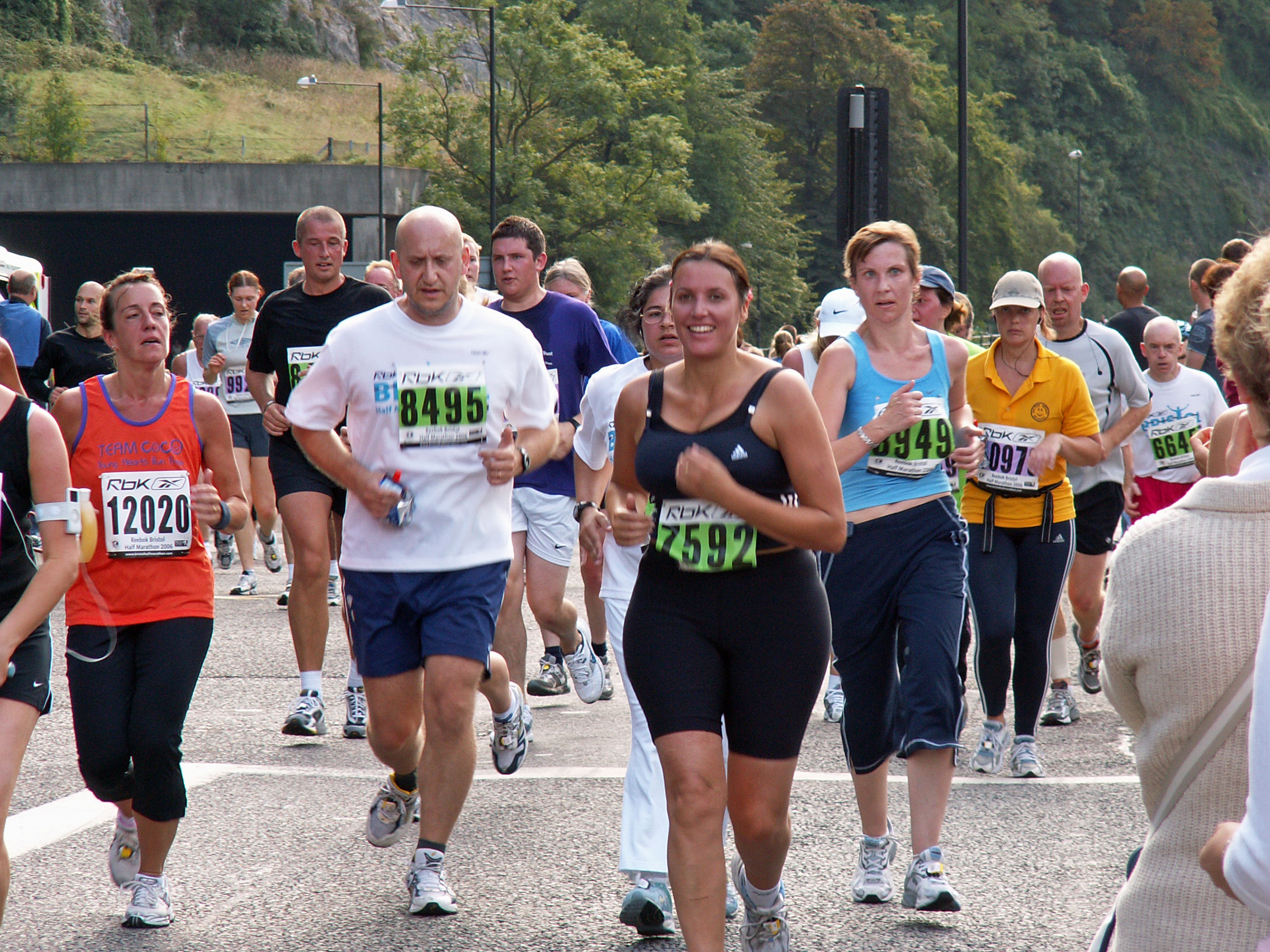
- Fun runners taking part in the 2006 Bristol Half Marathon
- Date: September
- Location: Bristol
- Event type: Half marathon
- Distance: 13 miles, 192.5 yards (21,097.5 metres)
- Established: 1989; 37 years ago
- Course records: Men's: 1:00:03 (Haile Gebrselassie, 2001); Women's: 1:06:47 (Paula Radcliffe, 2001)
- Website: Official Website

The Great Bristol Half Marathon is an annual road running event held on the streets of Bristol, UK. The route is at sea level and starts on Anchor Road outside We The Curious. Participants make their way toward Hotwells before heading under the Clifton Suspension Bridge and along the Portway toward Sea Mills before returning the same way then navigating around Cumberland Basin then along Spike Island before crossing Prince Street Bridge, circling Queen Square then heading to Castle Park via St Mary Redcliffe and Temple Circus. The final mile and a half take place in the Old City and Bristol City Centre before crossing the finish line back at Anchor Road.

The runner's village is located at Millennium Square.

== Race history ==
=== Bristol Marathon ===
The half-marathon had been preceded locally by the Bristol Marathon, which was first run in 1982. In 2014, a new marathon was launched in Bristol. Organised by Go2Events, the Bristol + Bath Marathon follows much of the Bristol Half Marathon route before heading out of the city through South Gloucestershire and into Bath finishing at Royal Victoria Park. The inaugural event took place on 25 October 2015.

=== Bristol Half Marathon ===
The first Bristol Half Marathon was held in 1989, with just 1,000 runners competing. The event grew with 12,000 competitors in 2005, 15,000 in 2006 and 16,000 in 2009, a figure around which the participation level has settled.

In the 1992 race, two Kenyan teammates finished first with the same time. Gideon Mutisya and David Mungai shared the 1:04:08 course-record time, though Mutisya was declared winner.

Notable editions of the race include 1997, when the event was titled 'The Cabot 500 Run Through History' to celebrate the 500th anniversary of John Cabot's first voyage to Newfoundland in 1497 and 2001, when the Bristol Half Marathon was also the 10th IAAF World Half Marathon Championships, and attracted competitors such as Haile Gebrselassie and Paula Radcliffe.

In 2007 the race incorporated the UK Athletics team selection trial for the 2007 IAAF World Road Running Championships, as well as the Amateur Athletic Association championship half marathon.

The first fatality in the race occurred in 2011, when a male runner collapsed and died.

The names of various sponsors have prefixed the title of the race in the past, with names including the Bupa Bristol Half Marathon, the Reebok Bristol Half Marathon and the Run Bristol Half Marathon, being sponsored by Bristol City Council. On 14 December 2015, it was announced from 2016 the event, alongside sister event the Bristol 10k, would be organised by Great Run and renamed the Great Bristol Half Marathon.

In 2011 a business challenge was introduced, to stimulate participation by colleagues within Bristol companies.

In 2024, a fatality occurred, when a 26-year old runner collapsed and died.

== Past winners ==
Key: Course record

Edition	Year	Men's winner	Time (h:m:s)	Women's winner	Time (h:m:s)
1st	1989	Steve Brace (GBR)	1:08:36	Bronwen Cardy-Wise (GBR)	1:20:05
2nd	1990	Wayne Buxton (GBR)	1:11:22	Zina Marchant (GBR)	1:18:47
3rd	1991	Nick Rose (GBR)	1:07:51	Cathy Newman (GBR)	1:18:14
4th	1992	Gideon Mutisya (KEN) (Note: Gideon Mutisya and David Mungai finished with the same official time in the 1992 race.)	1:04:08	Lesley Morton (GBR)	1:16:05
5th	1993	Lazarus Nyakeraka (KEN)	1:03:39	Karen MacLeod (GBR)	1:15:00
6th	1994	Charles Tangus (KEN)	1:02:45	Danielle Sanderson (GBR)	1:14:47
7th	1995	Bruce Chinnick (GBR)	1:06:12	Maureen Laney (GBR)	1:22:40
8th	1996	Martin Cox (GBR)	1:04:16	Olga Mitchurina (RUS)	1:13:56
9th	1997	Kassa Tadessa (GBR)	1:04:52	Trudi Thomson (GBR)	1:18:36
10th	1998	Kassa Tadessa (GBR)	1:06:36	Laura Woffenden (GBR)	1:20:08
11th	1999	Wilson Cheruiyot (KEN)	1:05:44	Cathy Newman (GBR)	1:17:37
12th	2000	Nick Wetheridge (GBR)	1:04:09	Andrea Green (GBR)	1:13:28
WHMC	2001	Haile Gebrselassie (ETH)	1:00:03	Paula Radcliffe (GBR)	1:06:47
13th	2001	Geoffrey Kinyua (KEN)	1:05:09	Andrea Green (GBR)	1:14:56
14th	2002	Hilary Lelei (KEN)	1:05:30	Emily Samoei (KEN)	1:16:43
15th	2003	Julius Kibet (KEN)	1:02:52	Meriem Wangari (KEN)	1:12:22
16th	2004	Simon Tanui (KEN)	1:04:18	Meriem Wangari (KEN)	1:13:40
17th	2005	Wilfred Taragon (KEN)	1:03:30	Birhan Dagne (GBR)	1:12:53
18th	2006	Patrick Makau (KEN)	1:03:38	Cathy Mutwa (KEN)	1:12:35
19th	2007	Tewodros Shiferaw (ETH)	1:03:01	Jane Muia (KEN)	1:10:26
20th	2008	Tom Payne (GBR)	1:05:48	Birhan Dagne (GBR)	1:14:18
21st	2009	Ezekiel Cherop (KEN)	1:03:25	Claire Hallissey (GBR)	1:12:03
22nd	2010	Edwin Kipyego (KEN)	1:03:08	Claire Hallissey (GBR)	1:12:02
23rd	2011	Edwin Kipyego (KEN)	1:03:20	Gemma Steel (GBR)	1:13:32
24th	2012	Dominic Ondoro (KEN)	1:02:51	Emily Biwott (KEN)	1:11:22
25th	2013	Bernard Rotich (KEN)	1:03:56	Emma Stepto (GBR)	1:13:40
26th	2014	Ben Siwa (UGA)	1:03:55	Gladys Yator (KEN)	1:13:01
27th	2015	Morris Gachaga (KEN)	1:01:32	Teresiah Omosa (KEN)	1:13:48
28th	2016	James Connor (GBR)	1:07:54	Jenny Spink (GBR)	1:14:58
29th	2017	Aaron Richmond (GBR)	1:08:07	Emma Stepto (GBR)	1:17:42
30th	2018	Matt Clowes (GBR)	1:05:10	Clara Evans (GBR)	1:16:26
31st	2019	Matt Clowes (GBR)	1:05:08	Annabel Gummow (GBR)	1:17:05
–	2020	Cancelled			
32nd	2021	Chris Thompson (GBR) (Note: Omar Ahmed finished first, but was disqualified as he had signed up for the 10 km race rather than the half marathon event.)	1:07:53	Chloe Richardson (GBR)	1:18:18
33rd	2022	Jacob Brockmann (AUS)	1:10:40	Charlotte Taylor (GBR)	1:15:49
34rd	2023	Alex Milne (GBR)	1:08:55	Charlie Arnell (GBR)	1:17:00

All information taken from runbristol, ARRS and This is Bristol

== See also ==
- 2001 IAAF World Half Marathon Championships
- Bristol + Bath Marathon
