= Angela Allen-Bell =

American activist scholar

Academic background
- Education: Northwestern State University; Southern University Law Center

Angela A. Allen-Bell is an American activist scholar who is known for her work on restorative justice and transitional justice. She is the B. K. Agnihotri Endowed Professor at Southern University Law Center.

== Education and career ==
Allen-Bell studied Political Science at Northwestern State University, and in 1992 she graduated with a Bachelor of Political Science degree. Allen-Bell then served as a non-profit Program Director for the National Council of Negro Women in 1994. Allen-Bell earned a Juris Doctor degree in 1998 from Southern University Law Center in Baton Rouge, Louisiana. After graduating from law school, Allen-Bell began her legal career working in an appellate court. In 2008, she transitioned to academia when she accepted a position at Southern University Law Center As of 2024, she is the B. K. Agnihotri Endowed Professor at Southern University Law Center.

== Work ==
Allen-Bell is known for her work on legal issues surrounding the Louisiana state constitution, including topics such as non-unanimous juries in Louisiana.

She is also known for her work advocating for people wrongfully imprisoned. This work has included leading the effort to undue the injustice done to two students who were killed on Southern University's campus in 1972. Through her efforts, the group received an award from Investigative Reporters and Editors and the work led to an official apology from Louisiana's Governor John Bel Edwards. She also worked on the release of Angola Three members Albert Woodfox, and Soledad Brother John Clutchette. Allen-Bell has spoken about Homer Plessy and she has worked on establishing the Black Panther Party as a legitimate civil and human rights group.

== Selected publications ==
- Allen-Bell, Angela Anita (1997–1998). "The Birth of the Crime: Driving While Black (DWB)". Southern University Law Review. 25: 195.
- Allen-Bell, Angela A. (2011–2012). "Perception Profiling & Prolonged Solitary Confinement Viewed through the Lens of the Angola 3 Case: When Prison Officials Become Judges, Judges Become Visually Challenged, and Justice Becomes Legally Blind". Hastings Constitutional Law Quarterly. 39: 763.
- Allen-Bell, Angela A. (2015). "A Prescription for Healing a National Wound: Two Doses of Executive Direct Action Equals a Portion of Justice and a Serving of Redress for America & the Black Panther Party". University of Miami Race and Social Justice Law Review. 5: 1.
- Allen-Bell, Angela (2017-09-05). "A Primer on the "Bell Case Synthesis Method" and a Lesson on Adult Child's Play". University of Bologna Law Review. 2: 68–86. doi:10.6092/ISSN.2531-6133/7234.
- Angela A. Allen-Bell, Under Indictment: Race, Juries & Justice in Louisiana (Spines 2024).
- Angela A. Allen-Bell, Diversity in the Jury Box and Beyond (LAP Lambert Acad. Publ'g 2024).
- Angela A. Allen-Bell, The Summons: Advocacy Insights for Systemic and Transformative Change (Spines 2025).

== Honors and awards ==
Allen-Bell was elected a fellow of the American Bar Foundation. She has been recognized by the Girl Scouts Louisiana East as a Woman of Distinction. In 2019 the House of Representatives of the Legislature of Louisiana commended her "for her achievements as a legal scholar" and recognized "the tremendous pride and honor that she brings" to the state of Louisiana. In 2025, Angela A. Allen-Bell was honored with the Southern University New Orleans (SUNO) Living Legends Award for her significant contributions to justice, legal scholarship, and advocacy, notably her pivotal role in abolishing Louisiana's non-unanimous jury system. Her lifelong commitment to dismantling racial hierarchies, promoting legal reforms, and elevating the voices of marginalized communities has made a lasting impact on the legal system and the broader quest for justice.
