= Emily Biwott =

Kenyan long-distance runner

Emily Biwott (born 1984) is a female long-distance runner from Kenya.

== Achievements ==
Year	Competition	Venue	Position	Event	Notes
2012	Bristol Half Marathon	Bristol, United Kingdom	1st	Half marathon	1:11:22
2013	Reading Half Marathon	Reading, United Kingdom	1st	Half marathon	1:12:14
