= Suzanne Rigg =

British long-distance runner

Suzanne Riggnée née Youngberg
Personal information
- Nationality: American / British
- Born: 29 November 1963 (age 62) Essex, Iowa, United States
- Height: 68 cm (2 ft 3 in)
- Weight: 50 kg (110 lb)

Sport
- Sport: Athletics
- Event: Long-distance running
- Club: Warrington AC

Suzanne Rigg (née Youngberg, born 29 November 1963) is an American-born long-distance runner who had dual American/British citizenship. She represented Great Britain at the 1996 Atlanta Olympics.

== Biography ==
Rigg was raised in Essex, Iowa and attended Iowa State University where she met British student, John Rigg, who won a gold medal in the men's 4 × 400 metres relay at the 1985 European Junior Championships.

After graduating, the pair married and went to live in Liverpool, England, before settling in Warrington, where Rigg was a member of Warrington AC.

Rigg finished second behind Andrea Wallace in the 10,000 metres event at the 1992 AAA Championships and became the British 5,000 metres champion after winning the British AAA Championships title at the 1993 AAA Championships. She also won a team silver medal at the 1992 IAAF World Half Marathon Championships.

Rigg represented England at the 1994 Commonwealth Games in Victoria, Canada and finished fourth in the 10,000 metres.

At the 1996 Olympic Games in Atlanta, Rigg represented Great Britain in the women's marathon event.

Rigg moved back to the USA with her family in 2007. In 2012, she became girls cross-country and distance head coach at Zionsville Community High School in Indiana.

== Competition record ==
Year	Competition	Venue	Position	Event	Notes
Representing Great Britain / England
1989	Chester Half Marathon	Chester, United Kingdom	1st	Half Marathon	1:16:53
1992	Wilmslow Half Marathon	Wilmslow, United Kingdom	1st	Half Marathon	1:13:42
1992	World Half Marathon Championships	Newcastle upon tyne, United Kingdom	31st	Half Marathon	1:12:49
1993	World Cross Country Championships	Amorebieta, Spain	63rd	6.36	21:21
1993	European Cup	Rome, Italy	4th	10,000 m	32:44.06 (PB)
1993	World Half Marathon Championships	Brussels, Belgium	12th	Half Marathon	1:12:07
1993	Chicago Marathon	Chicago, United Kingdom	6th	Marathon	2:45:00
1994	Wilmslow Half Marathon	Wilmslow, United Kingdom	1st	Half Marathon	1:14:48
1994	London Marathon	London, United Kingdom	10th	Marathon	2:41:03
1994	Commonwealth Games	Victoria, British Columbia, Canada	4th	10000m	33:01.40
1994	World Cup	London, United Kingdom	5th	10,000 m	33:38.14
1995	Berlin Marathon	Berlin, United Kingdom	8th	Marathon	2:34:21 (PB)
1996	Wilmslow Half Marathon	Wilmslow, United Kingdom	1st	Half Marathon	1:12:32
1996	Olympic Games	Atlanta, United States	58th	Marathon	2:52.09
1996	European Cross Country Championships	Charleroi, Belgium	17th	4.55 km	17:51
1997	World Cross Country Championships	Turin, Italy	96th	6.6 km	23:07
National Championships
1992	UK Championships (Olympic 10 km trial)	Sheffield, United Kingdom	3rd	10,000 m	33:16.03
1992	AAA Championships (Olympic trials)	Birmingham, United Kingdom	11th	3000 m	9:08.96
1993	AAA Championships	Birmingham, United Kingdom	1st	5000 m	15:57.67
1994	AAA Championships	Birmingham, United Kingdom	3rd	10,000 m	33:42.80
