= Derek Stevens (athlete) =

British marathon runner

Personal information
- Nationality: British
- Born: 19 May 1954 (age 72)

Sport
- Sport: Long-distance running
- Event: Marathon
- Club: Hastings Athletic Club

Achievements and titles
- Personal best(s): Half-marathon: 1:04:45; Marathon: 2:12:41

Derek Stevens (born 19 May 1954) is a retired runner from Hastings, East Sussex, United Kingdom, who was a top long distance runner at many global races in the 1980s. He was a top finisher at the 1985 Fukuoka Marathon in Japan and the 1982 London Marathon and the 1983 Geneva Marathon in Switzerland. In Australia, he took second in the 1983 Melbourne Marathon behind Juma Ikangaa. He was on the heels of Fred Torneden in 1983 at the Milwaukee Lakefront Marathon. While also in the United States, he followed in fellow countryman Gerry Helme's steps when he beat Don Norman, Barney Klecker, and Dick Beardsley on route to a 2:12:41 to win the Grandma's Marathon in 1984. His time stands as one of the fastest marathons ever run by a British athlete.

Stevens won a plethora of races in England in the 1980s, during the running boom. He was the 1985 and 1986 winner of the Hastings Half Marathon while representing the Hastings Athletic Club. He took first at the Seven Sisters trail marathons in 1983 and 1985 after winning the Fleet Half Marathon in 1982 in 1:05:32. Later, he was the top finisher at the inaugural Paddock Wood Half Marathon. But on the marathon majors stage, he made his biggest statement behind fellow Brits Hugh Jones, Mike Gratton, and Don Faircloth when he finished 14th in the 1982 London Marathon in 2:16:16. His gritty running style and his victories lead him to become one of the best known athletes from the Hastings Athletic Club.

== Personal life ==
Stevens later worked in local government.
