= Track and field at the 2011 Military World Games – Men's 10,000 metres =

The men's 10000 metres event at the 2011 Military World Games was held on 20 and 21 July at the Estádio Olímpico João Havelange.

== Records ==
Prior to this competition, the existing world and CISM record were as follows:

| World Record | Kenenisa Bekele (ETH) | 26:17.53 | Brussels, Belgium | 26 August 2005 |
| CISM World Record | Aloys Nizigama (BDI) | 27:47.77 | Tours, France | August 1993 |

== Schedule ==
| Date | Time | Round |
|---|---|---|
| 20 July 2011 | 9:45 | Semifinals |
| 21 July 2011 | 17:00 | Final |

== Medalists ==
| Gold | Silver | Bronze |
|---|---|---|
| Josphat Kiprono Menjo; Kenya | Ali Hasan Mahboob; Bahrain | Kiplimo Kimutai; Kenya |

== Results ==
=== Final ===
| Rank | Name | Nationality | Time | Notes |
|---|---|---|---|---|
| 1st place, gold medalist(s) | Josphat Kiprono Menjo | Kenya | 28:36.92 | |
| 2nd place, silver medalist(s) | Ali Hasan Mahboob | Bahrain | 28:37.08 | |
| 3rd place, bronze medalist(s) | Kiplimo Kimutai | Kenya | 28:45.27 | |
| 4 | Nguse Tesfaldet | Eritrea | 29:05.26 | |
| 5 | Gérard Gahungu | Burundi | 29:07.90 | |
| 6 | Mourad El Bannouri | Morocco | 29:24.92 | |
| 7 | Ezequiel Ngimba | Tanzania | 29:30.57 | |
| 8 | Arnold Kangoi | Tanzania | 29:36.40 | |
| 9 | Naiho Vianney | Burundi | 29:41.41 | |
| 10 | Abel Ndemi | France | 29:43.78 | |
| 11 | Khoudir Aggoune | Algeria | 29:52.71 | |
| 12 | Richard Friedrich | Germany | 30:13.26 | |
| 13 | Millen Matende | Zimbabwe | 30:16.67 | |
| 14 | Christian Kreienbühl | Switzerland | 30:20.35 | |
| 15 | Sean Houseworth | United States | 30:25.14 | |
| 16 | Øystein Sylta | Norway | 30:32.64 | |
| | Brahim Beloua | Morocco | DNF | |
| | Fouad Lariouch | France | DNF | |
| | Dan Browne | United States | DNS | |
| | Samson Gashazghi | Eritrea | DNS | |
