= Simon Kasimili =

Kenyan long-distance runner

Simon Kasimili (born 12 December 1980) is a male long-distance runner from Kenya.

== Road races ==
Year	Competition	Venue	Position	Event	Notes
2000	Hastings Half Marathon	Hastings, United Kingdom	1st	Half marathon	1:03:45
2002	Hastings Half Marathon	Hastings, United Kingdom	1st	Half marathon	1:04:55
2002	Great South Run	Portsmouth, United Kingdom	1st	10 miles	47:27
2006	Reading Half Marathon	Reading, United Kingdom	1st	Half marathon	1:04:51
2007	Reading Half Marathon	Reading, United Kingdom	1st	Half marathon	1:03:36
2008	Grand 10 Berlin	Berlin, Germany	1st	10 kilometres	28:44
2011	Reading Half Marathon	Reading, United Kingdom	1st	Half marathon	1:03:08
