= Tunbridge Wells Half Marathon =

Road running event in Kent, England

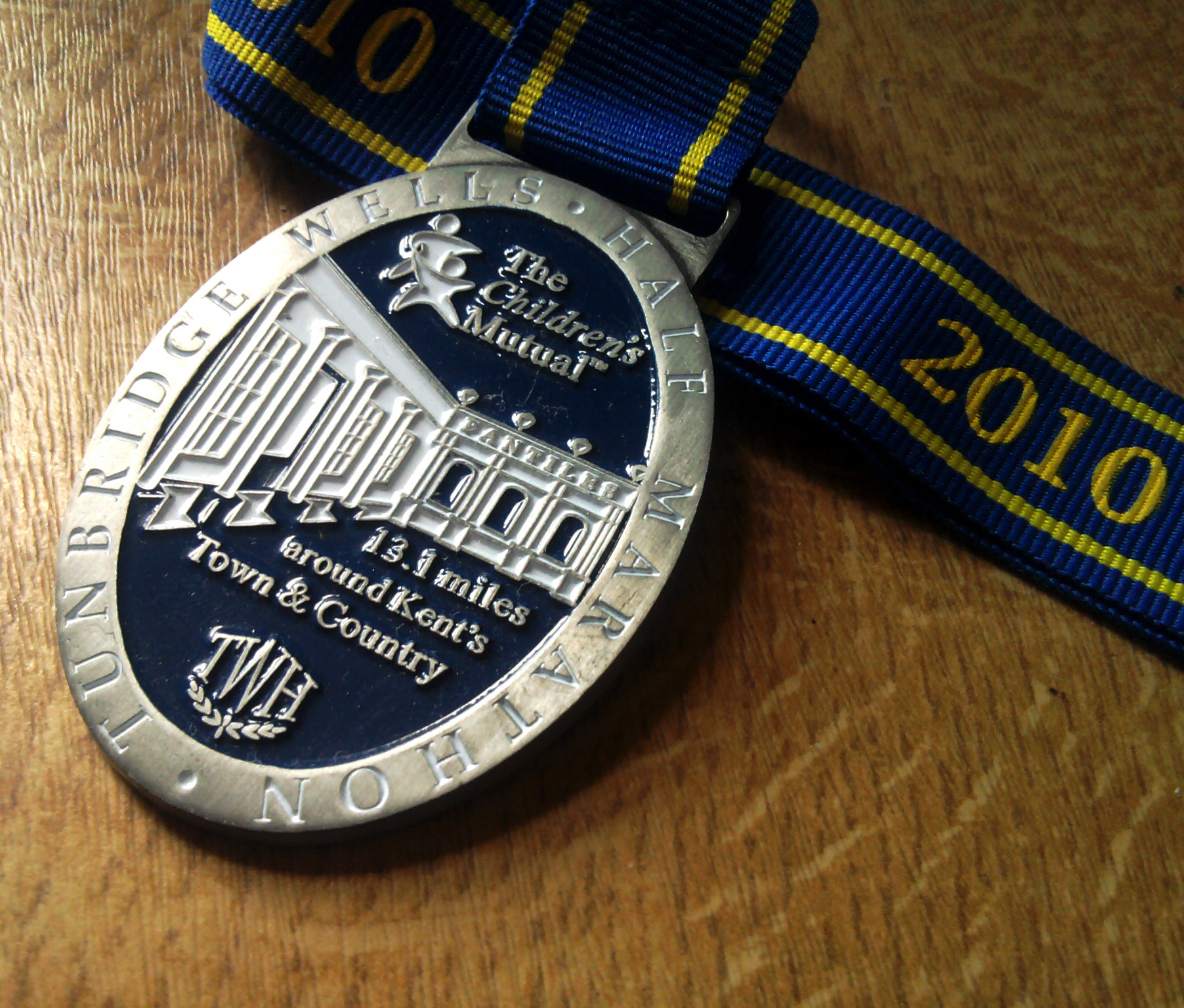
- 2010 Finishers Medal
- Date: February
- Location: Tunbridge Wells, United Kingdom
- Event type: Road
- Distance: Half Marathon
- Established: 1983
- Course records: 1:04:15

The Tunbridge Wells Half Marathon is a half marathon road running event that takes place in Tunbridge Wells every February. It is organised by the Tunbridge Wells Harriers running club.

The first Tunbridge Wells Half Marathon was staged in 1983, with just 53 runners. The race came in at number 38 in Runner's World's top 50 races of 2007, and was given a rating of 83 out of 100 by members of the magazine's forum. The magazine said that "The historical villages and the undulating course make for a great race". In 2008 the race attracted over 1,500 entrants.

The race is run on a single 13.1 miles (21.1 km) circuit through Tunbridge Wells and some of the nearby villages. It starts at the Tunbridge Wells Sports Centre on St John's Road, and follows the A26 through Southborough, the B2176 along Bidborough Ridge, the B2188 through Penshurst and Fordcombe and the A264 through Langton Green before rejoining the A26 to return to the finish line at the Sports Centre.

== Elite race winners ==
Key: Course record

=== Men ===
Year	Athlete	Nationality	Time (h:m:s)
2020	Billy Hobbs	United Kingdom	1:13:16
2019	Simon Goldsworthy	United Kingdom	1:11:29
2018	Simon Goldsworthy	United Kingdom	1:11:21
2017	James Connor	United Kingdom	1:08:50
2016	Paul Martelletti	New Zealand	1:08:30
2015	Daniel Bradley	United Kingdom	1:12:56
2014	Ben Cole	United Kingdom	1:11:11
2013	Tom Payn	United Kingdom	1:07:11
2012	Yared Hagos	Ethiopia	1:04:15
2011	Andy Greenleaf	United Kingdom	1:09:24
2010	Ben Moreau	United Kingdom	1:09:11
2009	Florian Neuschwander	Germany	1:08:49
2008	Benjamin Noad	United Kingdom	1:09:48
2007	William Levett	United Kingdom	1:11:15
2006	Julian Rendall	United Kingdom	1:13:56
2005	No event held		
2004	Julian Rendall	United Kingdom	1:12:51
2003	Allan Lee	United Kingdom	1:12:31
2002	Andrew Graffin	United Kingdom	1:10:39
2001	Darrell Smith	United Kingdom	1:11:26
2000	Scott McDonald	United Kingdom	1:13:42
1999	Barry Royden	United Kingdom	1:05:33

=== Women ===
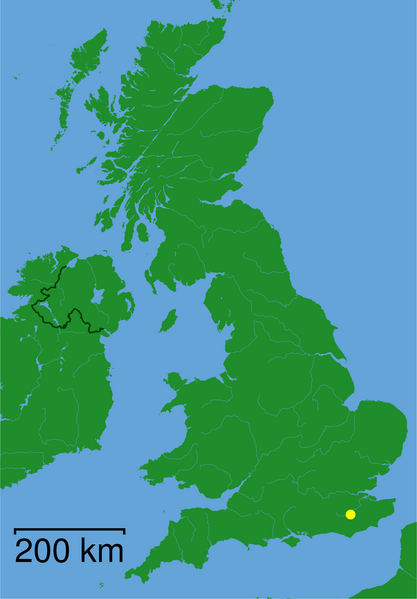
Tunbridge Wells on a map of UK

Year	Athlete	Nationality	Time (h:m:s)
2019	Helen Gaunt	United Kingdom	1:23:44
2019	Andrea Berquez	United Kingdom	1:26:35
2018	Maria Heslop	United Kingdom	1:22:25
2017	Maria Heslop	United Kingdom	1:22:29
2016	Maria Heslop	United Kingdom	1:23:43
2015	Alice Heather-Hayes	United Kingdom	1:22:35
2014	Maria Heslop	United Kingdom	1:21:17
2013	Deirdre McDermot	United Kingdom	1:21:58
2012	Helen Davies	United Kingdom	1:12:41
2011	Liz Yelling	United Kingdom	1:13:56
2010	Helen Decker	United Kingdom	1:18:37
2009	Tina Oldershaw	United Kingdom	1:22:57
2008	Tina Oldershaw	United Kingdom	1:23:12
2007	Emma Dennis	United Kingdom	1:27:55
2006	Miranda Heathcote	United Kingdom	1:24:25
2005	No event held		
2004	Tina Oldershaw	United Kingdom	1:25:10
2003	Tina Oldershaw	United Kingdom	1:25:33
2002	Kristina Farr	United Kingdom	1:26:24
2001	Andrea Green	United Kingdom	1:15:36
2000	Tina Oldershaw	United Kingdom	1:20:13
1999	Janice Moorekite	United Kingdom	1:23:20
