= Stadium MK =

Football stadium in Milton Keynes, England

- Moo Camp

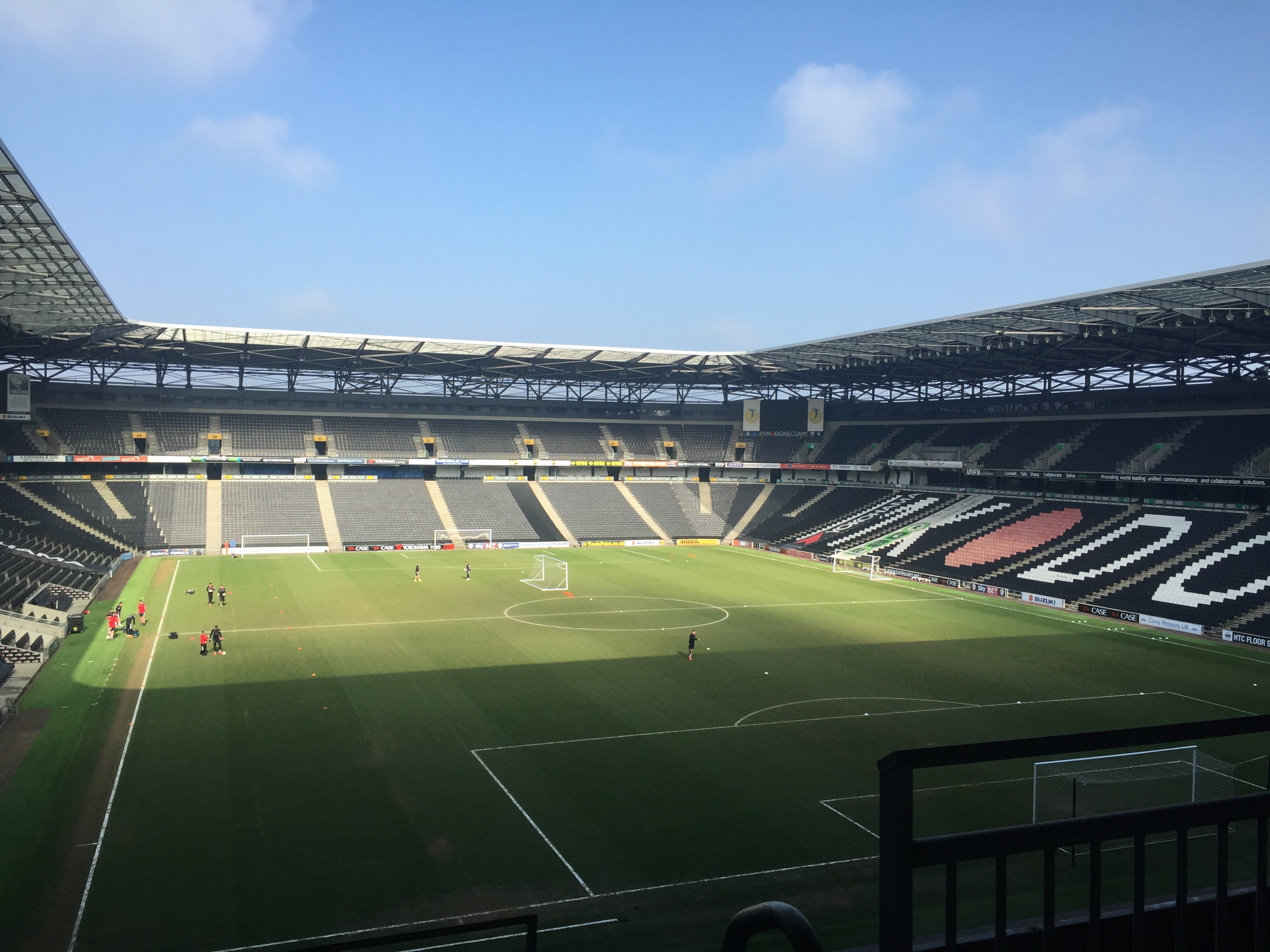
- View of the stadium's north and east stands in 2016
- Interactive map of Stadium MK
- Full name: Stadium MK
- Location: Denbigh, Bletchley, Milton Keynes, England
- Coordinates: 52°00′34″N 00°44′00″W
- Owner: Inter MK
- Capacity: 30,500
- Surface: Desso GrassMaster
- Record attendance: 30,048 Rugby World Cup 2015 Fiji vs Uruguay
- Field size: 105 m × 68 m
- Public transit: Bletchley; Milton Keynes Central

Construction
- Groundbreaking: 17 February 2005
- Built: 2007
- Opened: 29 November 2007 (first game 18 July 2007)
- Architect: HOK Sport (now Populous)
- Main contractor: Buckingham Group Contracting

Tenants
- Milton Keynes Dons (2007–present); Milton Keynes Dons Women (2018–present)

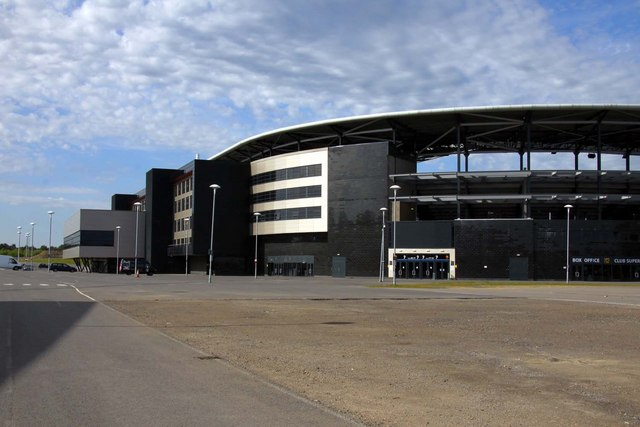
Stadium MK, frontage

Stadium MK is a football stadium in the Denbigh district of Bletchley in Milton Keynes, Buckinghamshire, England. Designed by Populous and opened in 2007, it is the home ground of EFL League One side Milton Keynes Dons and FA Women's National League South side Milton Keynes Dons Women. In 2022, the stadium hosted several matches during the UEFA Women's Euro 2022.

As of May 2015, the stadium has two tiers which hold a capacity of 30,500. Should it be required, there is the option to increase the capacity of the stadium again to 45,000 with the addition of a third tier, hence the high roof. The design meets UEFA's Elite Stadium specifications and includes a Desso GrassMaster playing surface.

The plans of the complex included an indoor arena, Arena MK, that was to be the home of the Milton Keynes Lions professional basketball team. However, the retail developments that would have provided enabling funding were deferred due to lack of financing, leaving the Lions without a home. Following the conclusion of the 2011–12 season, the Lions could not secure a venue within Milton Keynes, resulting in their relocation to London.

In addition to association football, the stadium occasionally hosts rugby union. The first such occasion was in May 2008, when Saracens (who at the time groundshared with Watford at Vicarage Road) played Bristol at Stadium MK because Watford needed their ground for a Championship play-off. In 2011, Northampton Saints RFC used the ground for their Heineken Cup quarter and semi-final matches because their home ground is too small for major events. The stadium hosted three matches in the 2015 Rugby World Cup.

The stadium also hosts concerts, with artists including Take That, Rammstein, Rod Stewart, Olly Murs, My Chemical Romance and Imagine Dragons having performed there in recent years.

== Construction, planning and background ==
=== Milton Keynes Stadium Consortium ===
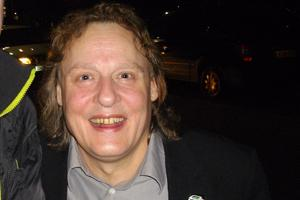
Pete Winkelman, who led Inter MK and the Milton Keynes Stadium Consortium, and subsequently became chairman of Milton Keynes Dons F.C. (2011 photograph)

From the first days of Milton Keynes as a new town, designated in 1967, the Milton Keynes Development Corporation (1967–1992) envisaged a stadium capable of accommodating a top-flight football team. What would become Stadium MK was first proposed in 2000 by the Milton Keynes Stadium Consortium or Stadium MK, led by Pete Winkelman and his company Inter MK Group. This consortium proposed a large development in the southern Milton Keynes district of Denbigh North, including a 30,000-capacity football stadium, a 150,000-square-foot (13,935 m^{2}) Asda hypermarket, an Ikea store, a hotel, a conference centre, and a retail park. The plan to build a ground of this size was complicated by the fact that there was no professional football club in Milton Keynes and that the highest-ranked team in the town, Milton Keynes City—based in Wolverton in northern Milton Keynes, and formerly known as Mercedes-Benz F.C.—played in the then eighth-tier Spartan South Midlands League, four divisions below the Football League. The developers could not justify building such a stadium for a club of this small stature.

Winkelman, an ex-CBS Records executive and music promoter, had moved to the Milton Keynes area from London in 1993. He attested to a vast untapped fanbase for football in Milton Keynes – a "football frenzy waiting to happen", he said. Critics of this claim pointed to the apparent lack of public interest in Milton Keynes City and the other local non-League clubs, and argued that Milton Keynes residents interested specifically in League football already had ample access with Luton Town, Northampton Town and Rushden & Diamonds all within 25 miles (40 km). Winkelman was the only person in Milton Keynes publicly associated with the project; his financial supporters, later revealed to be Asda (then a subsidiary of Walmart) and Ikea, were kept strictly anonymous.

Opponents of such a move surmised that the stadium was a "Trojan Horse" included in the blueprint to bypass planning rules, and that although the consortium described the larger development as enabling the construction of the stadium, the reverse was the case—Winkelman's consortium, they claimed, had to have a professional team in place right away to justify the ground so the development could get planning permission. David Conn of The Guardian corroborated this assessment. "The whole project was indeed dependent on Asda and Ikea," Conn summarised in a 2012 article, after interviewing Winkelman. "Having seen the opportunity to build a stadium Milton Keynes lacked, and realised Asda did not have a store in the town, Winkelman acquired options to buy the land from its three owners, including the council. Asda would not have been granted planning permission for a huge out-of-town superstore unless it gave the council the benefit of building the stadium. A League club would move up, permission would be granted, then Winkelman would exercise the option to buy all the land, sell it to Asda and Ikea for very much more, and the difference would be used to build the stadium." Conn retrospectively described this as the "deal of a lifetime".

In August 2024, Wimkelman transferred control of the stadium and the club to a Kuwaiti Arab consortium led by Fahad Al-Ghani, free of all debts and liabilities. The terms were not disclosed.

=== Relocation of Wimbledon F.C.; Milton Keynes Dons F.C. ===
Starting in 2000 the consortium offered this proposition to several Football League clubs, including Luton Town, Crystal Palace, Barnet, Queens Park Rangers, and Wimbledon F.C. Wimbledon F.C., who had groundshared at Crystal Palace's Selhurst Park ground since 1991, adopted the Milton Keynes plan after the appointment of a new chairman, Charles Koppel, in January 2001. Koppel said that such action was necessary to prevent Wimbledon F.C.'s going out of business. He announced Wimbledon F.C.'s intent to move on 2 August 2001 with a letter to the Football League requesting approval, stating that Wimbledon had already signed an agreement to relocate and "subject to the necessary planning and regulatory consents being obtained" intended to be playing home games at a newly built stadium in Milton Keynes by the start of the 2003–04 season. The proposed move was opposed in most quarters; the League board unanimously rejected Wimbledon's proposed move in August 2001. Koppel appealed against this decision, leading to a Football Association (FA) arbitration hearing and subsequently the appointment of a three-man independent commission by the FA in May 2002 to make a final and binding verdict. The League and FA stated opposition but the commissioners ruled in favour, two to one.

Wimbledon F.C. hoped to move to Milton Keynes immediately, but as the new ground was yet to be built an interim home in the town would have to be found first. The first proposal, to start the 2002–03 season at the National Hockey Stadium in central Milton Keynes, was abandoned because it did not meet Football League stadium criteria. While alternative temporary options were examined—Winkelman suggested converting the National Bowl music venue—Wimbledon F.C. started the season at Selhurst Park and set a target of playing in MK by Christmas 2002. A group of Wimbledon F.C. fans protested by setting up AFC Wimbledon, to which the vast majority of Wimbledon F.C. fans switched allegiance, in June 2002. A temporary stadium in Milton Keynes proved difficult to arrange and Wimbledon F.C. remained in south London at the end of the 2002–03 season. Koppel announced a plan to convert the National Hockey Stadium for football and play there from the start of the 2003–04 season until the new stadium was built.

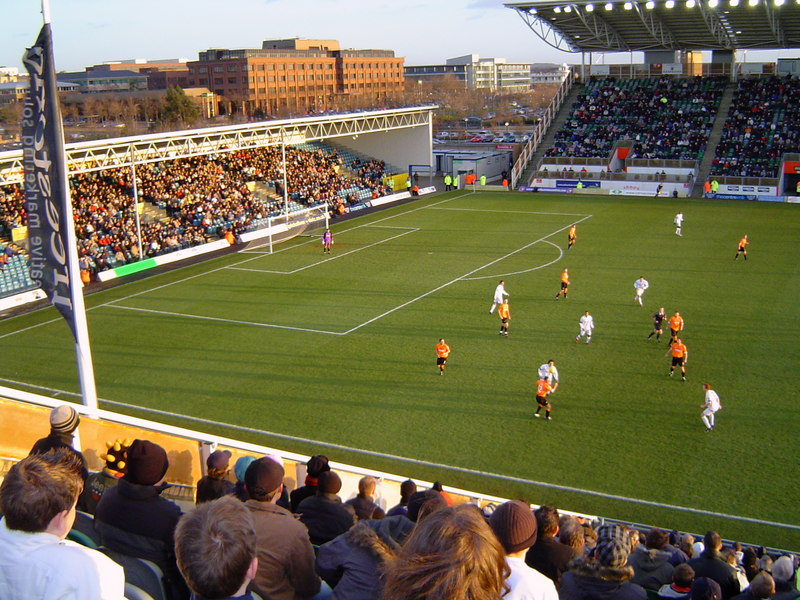
MK Dons (white shirts) playing at the National Hockey Stadium during the 2004–05 season

Wimbledon F.C. entered administration in June 2003. After the club missed a deadline to invest in renovations to the Hockey Stadium, confusion arose as to whether Wimbledon F.C. would move and where they would play if they did. The administrators arranged a return to Selhurst Park. With the move threatened and the club facing liquidation, Winkelman made "the life-defining decision", to quote Conn, "of taking it on himself". He secured funds from his consortium for the administrators to pay the players' wages, keep the club operating, and pay for the necessary renovations for the National Hockey Stadium to host League football.

After hosting the first few home matches of the 2003–04 campaign at Selhurst Park, Wimbledon F.C. played their first match in Milton Keynes in September 2003. A company voluntary arrangement was put together in March 2004 under which Winkelman's consortium would take Wimbledon F.C. out of administration, reportedly using a holding company called MK Dons. The Football League threatened to expel the club if the takeover were not completed by 31 July. Winkelman's Inter MK Group brought Wimbledon F.C. out of administration in late June 2004 and concurrently announced changes to its name, badge and colours. The new name was Milton Keynes Dons F.C. (commonly shortened to MK Dons).

Milton Keynes Dons continued to play at the National Hockey Stadium while the development including the new ground was constructed in Denbigh. Asda paid Inter MK £35 million for its section of the site, Ikea £24 million. Ground was broken on the stadium in February 2005. In December 2005 MK Dons set a target of playing at the new ground by January 2007; in February 2007 they revised their proposal to a 22,000-seater stadium ready in July of that year, with provision for expansion to 32,000 (it had originally been intended to seat 30,000). The new ground, Stadium MK, hosted its first match in July 2007. Four months later, on 29 November 2007, it was officially opened by Queen Elizabeth II.

== Attendances ==
Although attendances increased since leaving the National Hockey Stadium, the MK Dons average attendance of 10,550 during the 2008–09 League One season remained below half the ground capacity. The MK Dons average home attendance for the first part of the 2009–10 season was ranked sixth out of 24 teams in League One. The average attendance for the 2012–13 season was just 8,612; in the 2013–14 season it was 9,047; in the 2015–16 season it was 13,158. In 2016–17 it was 10,306.

On 29 March 2014, the stadium saw Wolverhampton Wanderers take a record away attendance of 8,943 supporters in a League One fixture. The total attendance for the match was 20,516.

The record attendance for a football match at Stadium MK was on 25 September 2019 when a crowd of 28,521 attended to see MK Dons lose 2–0 to Liverpool in the EFL Cup 3rd round. This record attendance surpassed the one set on 31 January 2016 when a crowd of 28,127 attended Milton Keynes Dons' 5–1 defeat in the FA Cup fourth round by Chelsea, which had beaten the previous record of 26,969 who witnessed a shock 4–0 win over Manchester United in the second round of the League Cup on 26 August 2014. On 6 October 2015, Stadium MK hosted the Rugby World Cup match, Uruguay versus Fiji, and this set the new overall record attendance at 30,043. On 7 March 2026, a record league attendance of 23,456 was set against Harrogate Town in League Two.

== Association football (men’s) ==
=== Milton Keynes Dons ===
The football club's first stadium was the National Hockey Stadium, which was temporarily converted for football for the duration of the club's stay whilst Stadium MK was under construction. Their lease on this ground ended in May 2007.

On 18 July 2007, the club's new 22,000 seater stadium hosted its first game, a restricted-entrance event against a young Chelsea XI. The stadium was officially opened on 29 November 2007 by the Queen. Milton Keynes Dons are the stadium's main tenant and most frequent user, with all the amenities built within the stadium (such as the club shop) designed for the club's benefit.

=== Internationals ===
It has hosted two England under-21 internationals. The first was a 2009 UEFA European Under-21 Championship qualification Group 3 match against Bulgaria's under-21s on 16 November 2007. The hosts beat the visitors 2–0 with Mark Noble scoring twice (on the tenth minute and the seventeenth minute) and James Milner scoring on the twenty sixth minute with 20,222 in attendance. The other was an international friendly against Azerbaijan's under 21s 31 March 2009. The hosts thrashed the visitors 7–0 with Kieran Gibbs scoring twice and single goals from Michael Mancienne, Craig Gardner and Jack Rodwell as well as own goals from Elcin Sadiqov and Elvin Mammadov with 12,020 in attendance.

On 5 June 2010, the stadium hosted a full international friendly; Ghana beat Latvia 1–0 in their last warm-up before the World Cup in South Africa.

=== England 2018 World Cup bid ===
In December 2009, The FA awarded Candidate Host City status to Milton Keynes. Had England won the bid, Stadium MK would have hosted some games. For this to happen, the stadium capacity would have had to be increased to 44,000. However, on 2 December 2010, FIFA decided not to award the World Cup to England.

=== Tottenham Hotspur ===
In late 2014, it was reported that Premier League club Tottenham Hotspur were in negotiations with MK Dons over a temporary groundshare at Stadium MK for a season, during renovations at Spurs' White Hart Lane ground.

According to press reports, Tottenham proposed to play most home matches in MK and a small number at Wembley Stadium. The idea of playing home matches in Milton Keynes, even temporarily, was largely unpopular with Spurs fans. The Tottenham Hotspur Supporters Trust stated in September 2014 that it would have "serious issues" with such an arrangement. In a London Evening Standard poll of 206 Tottenham fans two months later, 71 (34%) said they would attend home matches at Stadium MK if the club played there temporarily, while 135 (66%) said they would not.

The Premier League chief executive at the time Richard Scudamore stated in July 2015 that the Premier League would have no objection to Tottenham groundsharing temporarily—either with MK Dons or with Chelsea at Wembley—but to defend "the integrity of the competition" would not allow Tottenham to play home matches at more than one location in the same season. Two months later, the FA chief executive Martin Glenn indicated that he supported the idea of clubs playing temporarily at Wembley while their grounds were redeveloped. Spurs eventually ended up playing a game at Stadium MK against Watford in front of 23,650 people a fixture supported by former MK Dons player and Milton Keynes local Dele Alli.

== Association football (women's) ==
=== FA Women's Cup Final ===
On 1 June 2014, the stadium hosted the 2013–14 FA Women's Cup final. Arsenal defeated Everton 2–0.

=== Milton Keynes Dons Women ===
As of the 2018–19 season, MK Dons women's team share Stadium MK as their home stadium with their male counterparts, Milton Keynes Dons – one of the first clubs in the country to share a stadium between both men's and women's teams of the same club.

=== UEFA Women's Euro 2022 ===
Stadium MK was selected as one of several venues for the UEFA Women's Euro 2022 tournament. The stadium hosted Group B fixtures Spain v. Finland (8 July 2022), Denmark v. Finland (12 July 2022) and Finland v. Germany (16 July 2022). On 28 July 2022, a 27,445 attendance saw Germany defeat France 2–1 in the second semi-final.

=== Women’s Internationals held at Stadium MK ===
Date	Home	Away	Result	Attendance	Stage
8 July 2022	Spain	Finland	4–1	16,819	UEFA Women's Euro 2022 Group B
12 July 2022	Denmark	Finland	1–0	11,615	UEFA Women's Euro 2022 Group B
16 July 2022	Finland	Germany	0–3	20,721	UEFA Women's Euro 2022 Group B
21 July 2022	Germany	France	2–1	27,445	UEFA Women's Euro 2022 Semi Final
1 July 2023	England	Portugal	0-0	26,267	Friendly

== Rugby ==
=== Premiership ===
Saracens were the first club to host a Premiership rugby match at Stadium MK when Bristol Rugby visited on 10 May 2008, away from their regular Vicarage Road ground, due to Watford F.C. playing at home in the 2008 Championship play-off semi-final. It provided a grand stage for Rugby World Cup 2003 winner Richard Hill's 288th and last appearance for the men in black. A last-minute try from Kameli Ratuvou ensured Hill's 15-year club career finished on a winning note.

On 30 December 2012, Saracens hosted Northampton Saints for a regular season match at Stadium MK, whilst their stadium at Barnet Copthall was still being built. The Saints hosted Saracens in April 2015 before a record 27,411 crowd, as a Premiership game and additionally as a preparation exercise for the stadium's hosting of the 2015 Rugby World Cup. Northampton hosting games at Stadium MK became a regular occurrence and Saints hosted one game a season at the stadium between the 2014–15 and 2016–17 seasons.

=== European Rugby Champions Cup ===
On 24 January 2011, the Northampton Saints Rugby union club announced that their 2010–11 Heineken Cup quarter final match against Ulster would take place in the stadium, because their Franklin's Gardens ground was too small to meet the minimum 15,000 seats demanded by the organisers. Franklin's Gardens has since been expanded.

The Saints had previously indicated that they might play future major games at Stadium MK as their proposal to expand Franklin's Gardens using an enabling (ASDA supermarket) development had encountered planning difficulties.

Accordingly, their quarter-final match was played at the stadium on Sunday 10 April 2011 in front of a (then) stadium record crowd of 21,309 supporters who witnessed the Saints (the 'home' side for the day) beat Ulster 23–13. This secured for the Saints a place in the semi-final of the Heineken Cup where they went on to beat USA Perpignan, again at Stadium MK.

On 21 January 2012, Northampton Saints played their final 2011–12 Heineken Cup pool match at Stadium MK against Munster. Saints were defeated 36–51 but the game set a new stadium record attendance of 22,220.

=== Rugby World Cup 2015 ===
On 8 October 2012, the organisers of the 2015 Rugby World Cup announced that the stadium was one of 17 to be short-listed for detailed appraisal, leading to the final choice of 12 stadiums to be announced in March 2013 It was officially announced as a venue for the 2015 Rugby World Cup on 2 May, and with the venue capacity to expand to 32,000, it hosted three fixtures. The first was a Pool D match between France and Canada on 1 October 2015 with France winning 41–18 with 28,145 in attendance. The second was a Pool B match between Samoa and Japan two days later with Japan winning 26–5 with 29,019 in attendance. The third and final was a Pool A match between Fiji and Uruguay three days later with Fiji winning 47–15 with new stadium attendance record, with 30,048 in attendance.

== Concerts ==
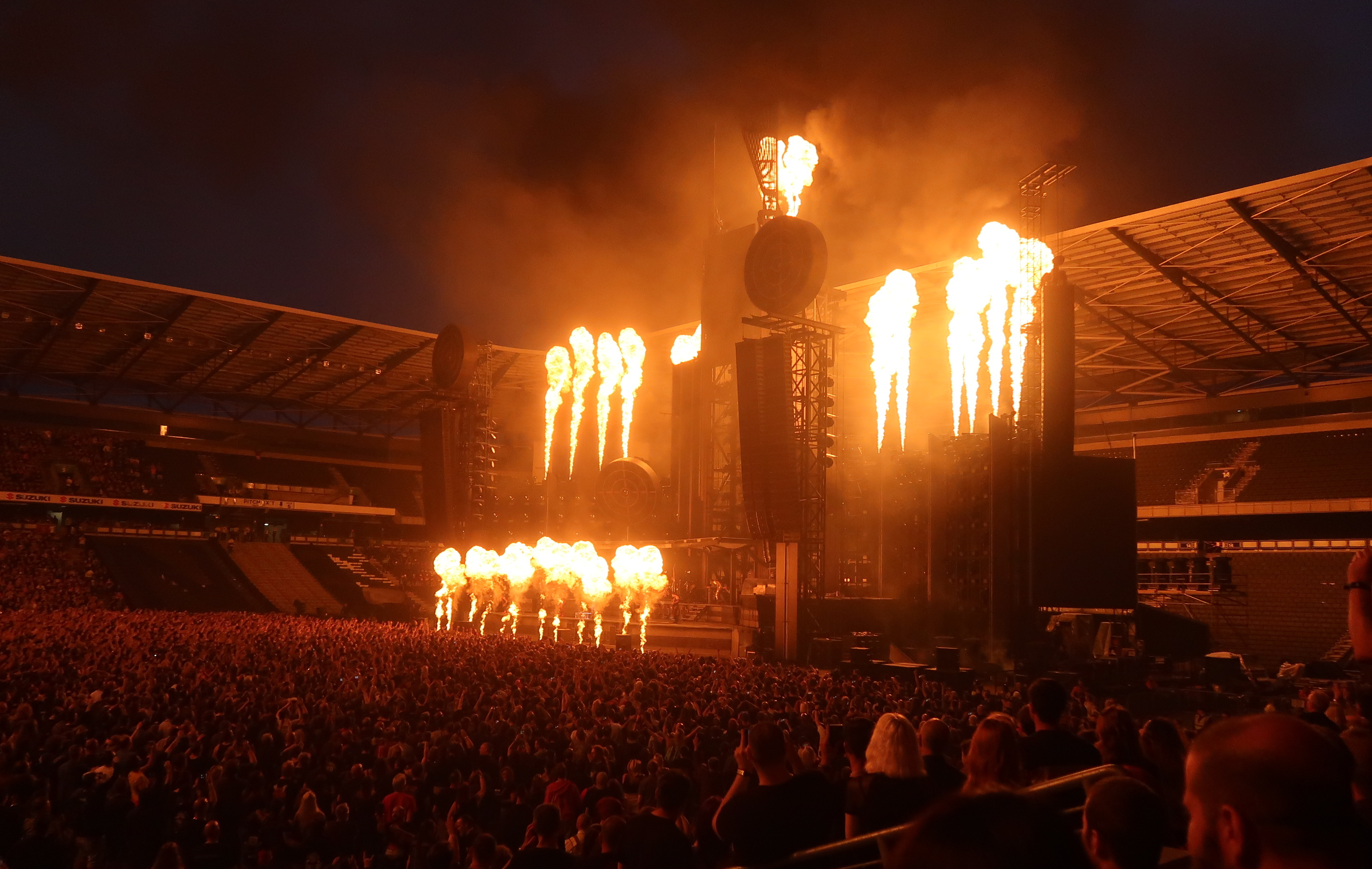
German band Rammstein playing at the stadium in 2019

The stadium has also hosted large-scale concerts performed by various music artists and groups:

Date(s)	Artist	Tour	Support act(s)	Ref.
8 July 2011	JLS, Olly Murs	N/A	Alexis Jordan	
23 May 2019	Take That	Greatest Hits Live 2019	Rick Astley	
4 June 2019	Rod Stewart	Live in Concert 2019	Johnny Mac & The Faithful	
6 July 2019	Rammstein	Europe Stadium Tour 2019	Duo Jatekok	
19, 21, 22 May 2022	My Chemical Romance	Reunion Tour	Placebo, LostAlone, Aviva, Barns Courtney, Cassyette, Starcrawler, Charlotte Sands	
18 June 2022	Imagine Dragons	Mercury Tour	Mother Mother, Lola Young	
30 May 2024	Take That	This Life on Tour	Olly Murs	

== Other events ==
The stadium was used during the 50th birthday celebrations of Milton Keynes which took place during 2017.

Jehovah's Witnesses' annual conventions have been held at the stadium.

The sci-fi convention Collectormania was held at the venue between 2009 and 2013.

The 2021 and 2022 UK's Strongest Man competitions were held at the stadium.

The annual Milton Keynes Marathon starts and finishes in the stadium.

== Naming of stands ==
The South stand of Stadium MK is known as the Cowshed by Dons fans, as Milton Keynes is known for its Concrete Cows. This nickname was also used for the home end at the Dons' previous ground in Milton Keynes, the National Hockey Stadium, now demolished.

The North stand is unofficially known as "The Boycott End", after the AFC Wimbledon fans announcing a boycott of the first fixture between the two teams in 2012 but then changed their mind and sold out the away ticket allocation by bringing more than 3,000 fans to the game.

The side stands are known for the direction in which they are from the pitch (East and West).

== Location ==
The stadium is in south central Milton Keynes, in Denbigh, a part of the Bletchley and Fenny Stratford civil parish, near the junction of the A5 and the A421 spur.

=== Local/nearby facilities ===
Local facilities include a 'Double Tree' hotel and a shopping complex with Next, Primark, and Marks & Spencer stores, restaurants including Nando's, TGI Fridays, Prezzo, and Bella Italia, and a 16-screen Odeon cinema. There is an ASDA hypermarket and a large IKEA store in the wider local area.

=== Transport ===
The nearest railway stations are Bletchley and Fenny Stratford. Both of these are about 1.3 miles (2.1 km) away from the stadium. Milton Keynes Central station, about 2.6 miles (4.2 km) away, has more intercity services. Milton Keynes Central and Bletchley are on the busy West Coast Main Line to London, the West Midlands and the North-West; Fenny Stratford is on the low-frequency Marston Vale line between Bletchley and Bedford. There are shuttle bus connections from the Central and Bletchley stations. Car parking beside the stadium is limited and expensive: time limits on parking outside the nearby shops are strictly enforced on match days. On special occasions, the National Bowl is used for overflow parking.

== Gallery ==
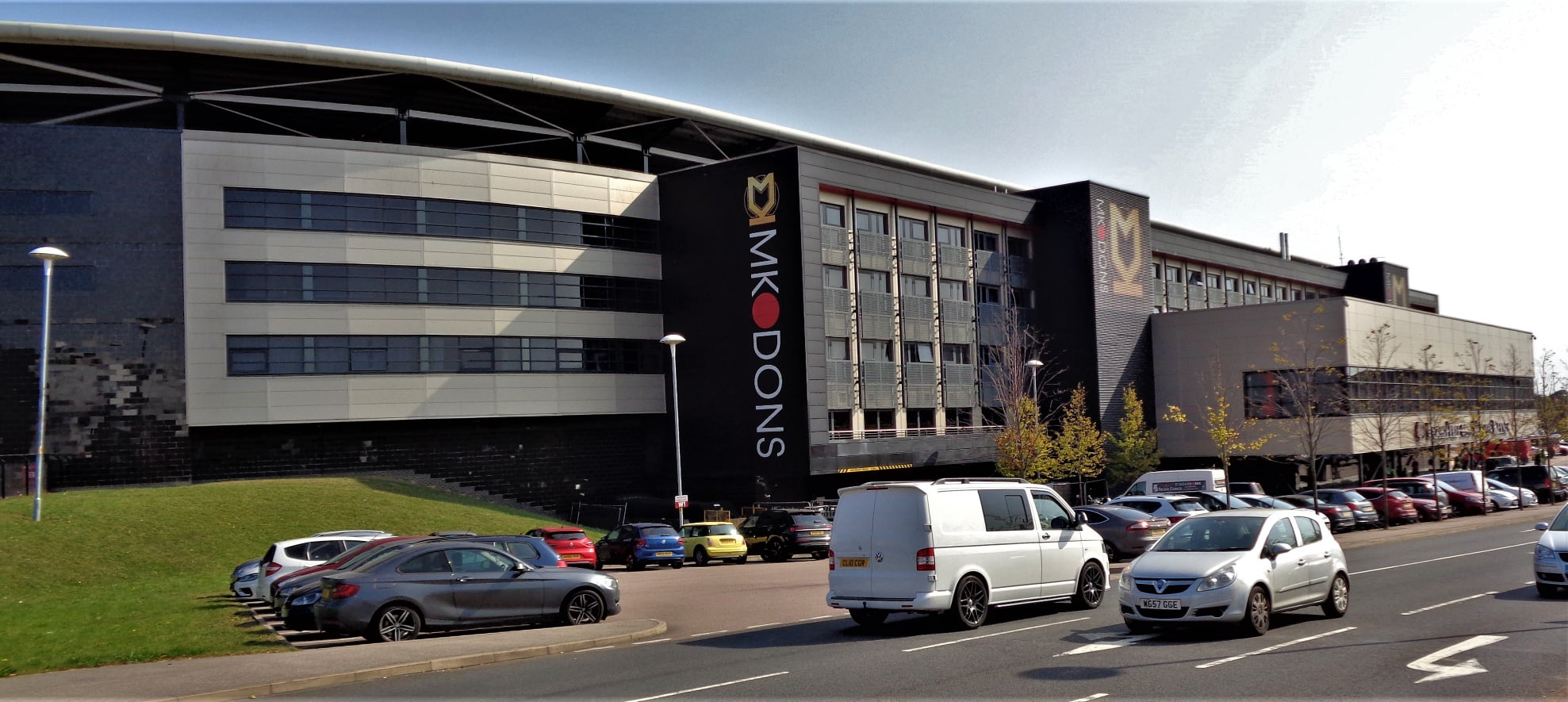
The exterior of the west stand in September 2020

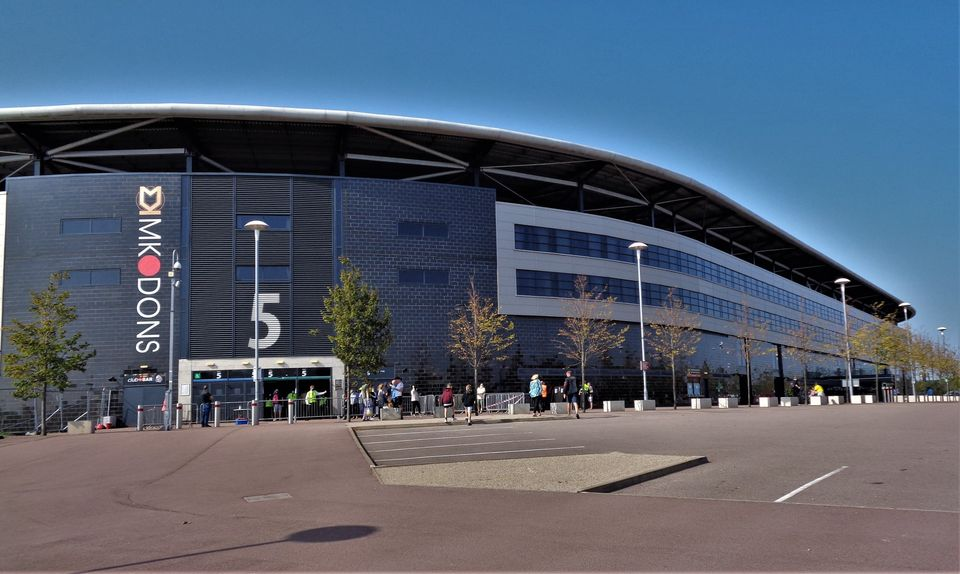
The exterior of the east stand in September 2020

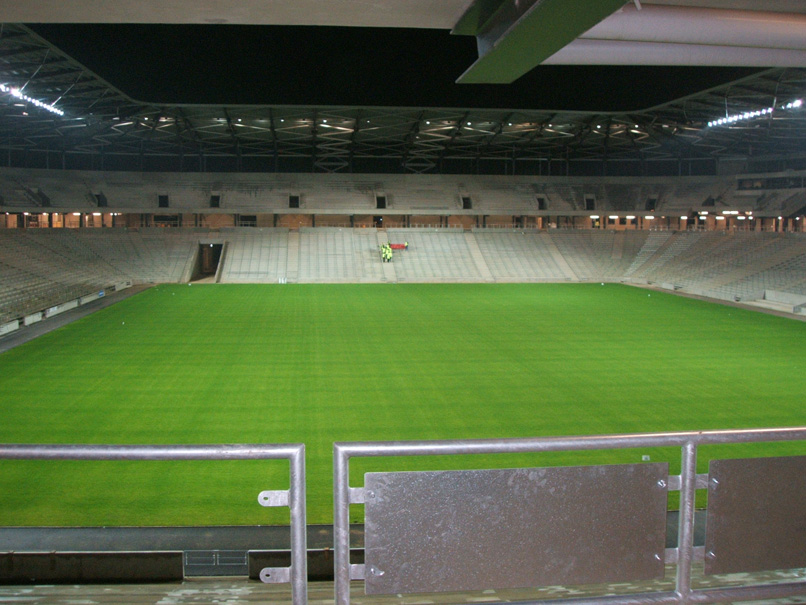
The view of the pitch towards the south stand before re-development

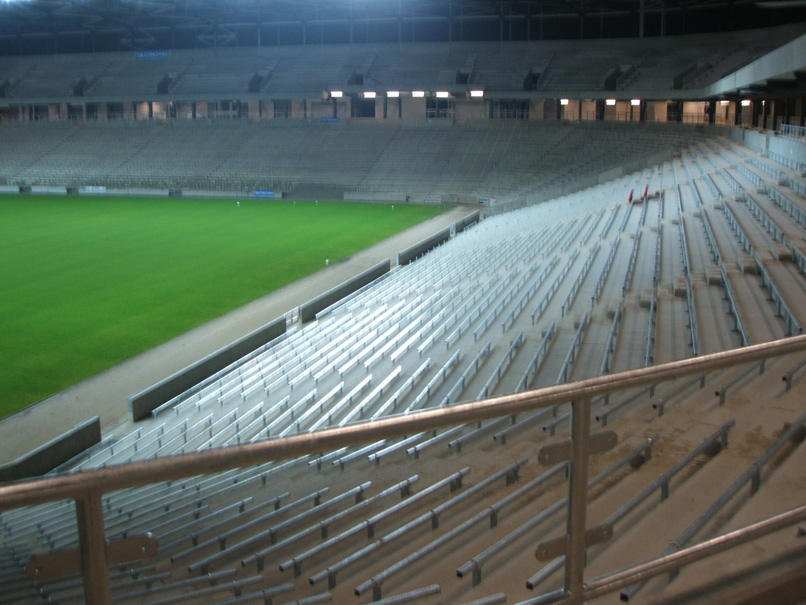
The south stand as of 22 February 2007

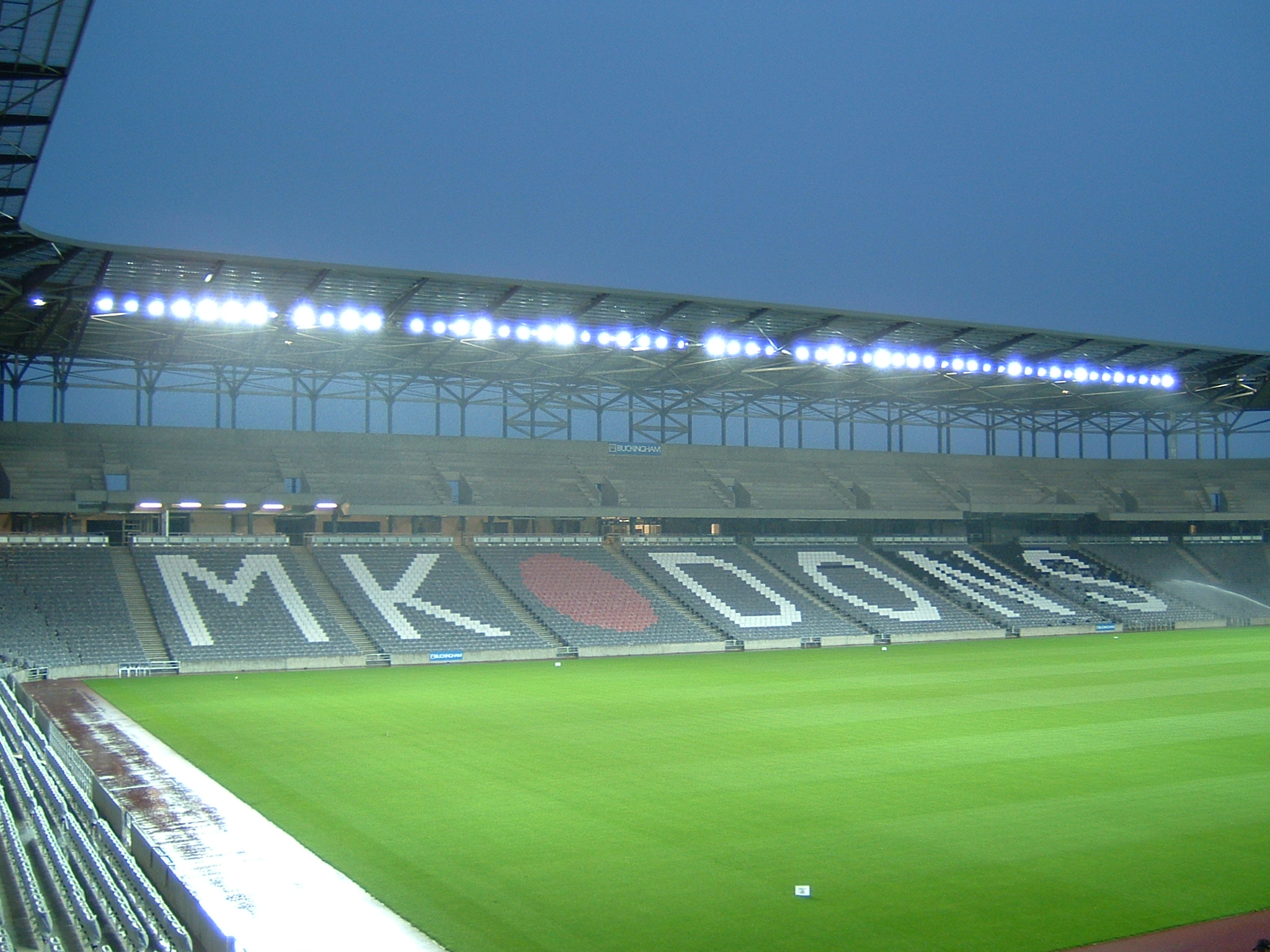
The east stand on 16 May 2007

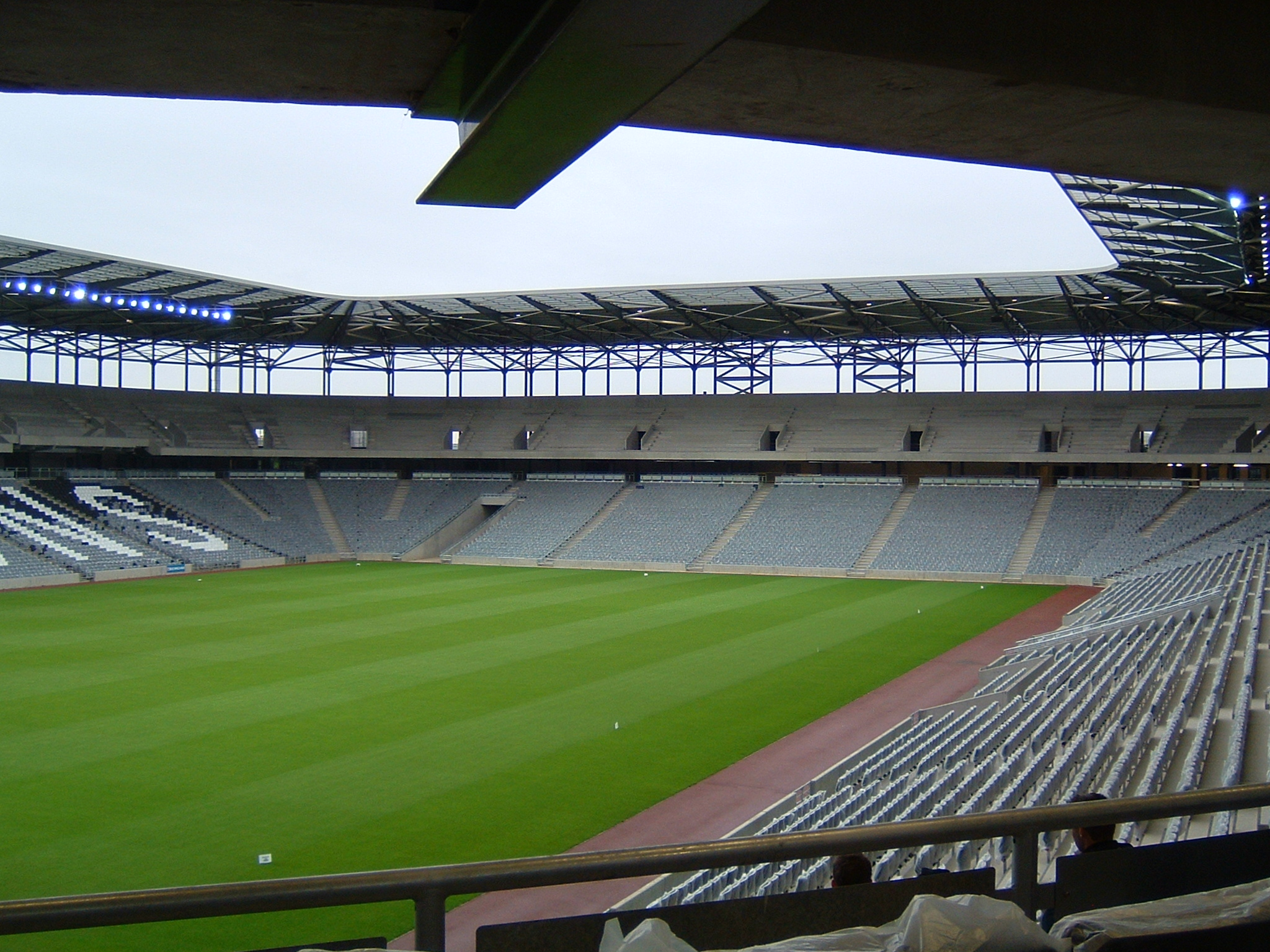
The south (Cowshed) stand of Denbigh Stadium as of 16 May 2007

== See also ==
- Arena MK – Multi-purpose indoor arena in Milton Keynes, England beside the stadium
- Ground improvements at English football Stadia
- List of stadiums in the United Kingdom by capacity
- Lists of stadiums
