= 1982 London Marathon =

2nd London Marathon

2nd London Marathon
- Venue: London, United Kingdom
- Date: 9 May 1982

Champions
- Men: Hugh Jones (2:09:24)
- Women: Joyce Smith (2:29:43)

The 1982 London Marathon was the second running of the annual marathon race in London, United Kingdom, which took place on Sunday, 9 May. The elite men's race was won by home athlete Hugh Jones in a time of 2:09:24 hours and the women's race was won by Britain's Joyce Smith in 2:29:43.

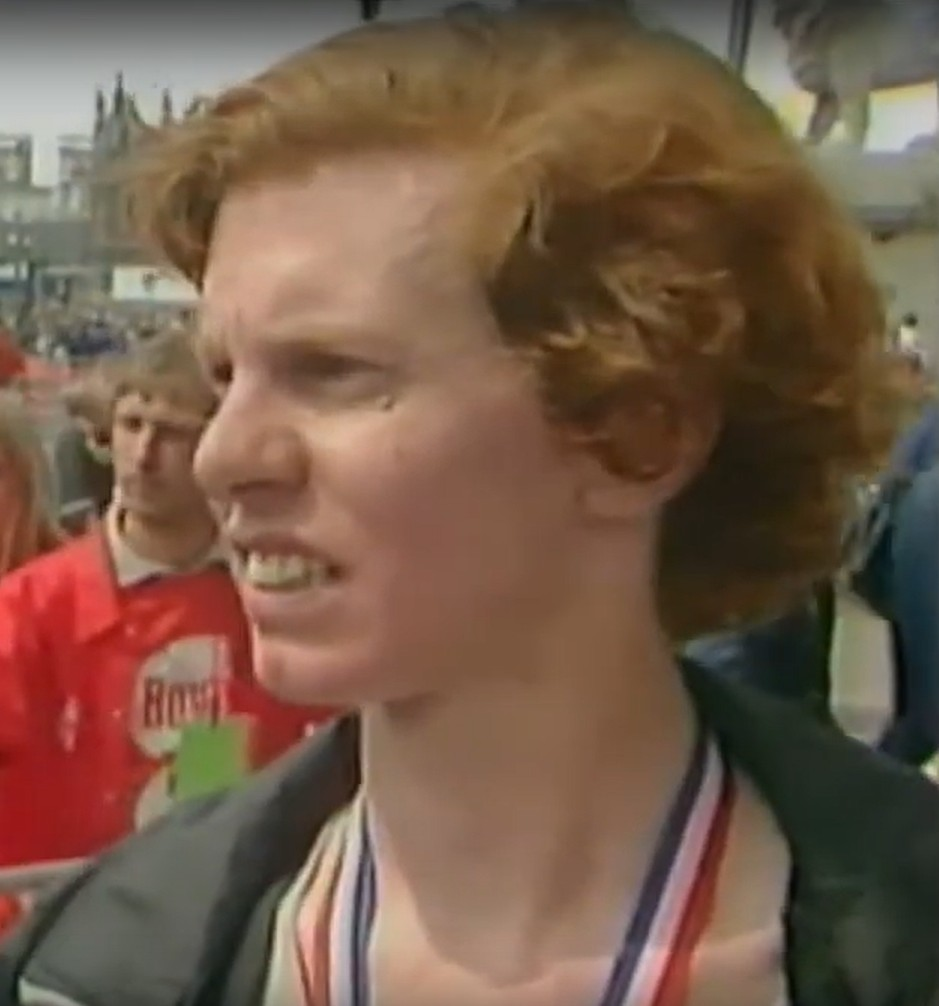
Hugh Jones after winning 1982 London Marathon

Around 90,000 people applied to enter the race, of which 18,059 had their applications accepted and around 16,350 started the race. A total of 15,116 runners finished the race.

== Results ==
=== Men ===
Position	Athlete	Nationality	Time
1st place, gold medalist(s)	Hugh Jones	United Kingdom	2:09:24
2nd place, silver medalist(s)	Øyvind Dahl	Norway	2:12:21
3rd place, bronze medalist(s)	Mike Gratton	United Kingdom	2:12:30
4	Jeff Wells	United States	2:13:43
5	Kevin McCarey	United States	2:13:48
6	Phil Coppess	United States	2:13:57
7	David Clark	Scotland	2:15:28
8	Svein-Arve Pedersen	Norway	2:15:28
9	William Glad	United States	2:15:41
10	Don Faircloth	United Kingdom	2:15:50
11	Mervyn Brameld	United Kingdom	2:15:59
12	Atle Fosse	Norway	2:15:59
13	John McLaughlin	United Kingdom	2:16:09
14	Derek Stevens	United Kingdom	2:16:16
15	Paul Champion	United Kingdom	2:16:29
16	Zoltan Kiss	Hungary	2:16:35
17	Istvan Kerekjarto	Hungary	2:16:45
18	Alex Kasich	United States	2:16:59
19	Ferenc Szekeres	Hungary	2:17:10
20	Steven Poulton	Australia	2:17:22

=== Women ===
Position	Athlete	Nationality	Time
1st place, gold medalist(s)	Joyce Smith	United Kingdom	2:29:43
2nd place, silver medalist(s)	Lorraine Moller	New Zealand	2:36:15
3rd place, bronze medalist(s)	Judith Hine	New Zealand	2:41:49
4	Beverley Shingles	New Zealand	2:43:34
5	Libby Pfeiffer	United Kingdom	2:45:52
6	Jean Lochhead	United Kingdom	2:46:04
7	Margaret Lockley	United Kingdom	2:46:53
8	Winnie Ng	Hong Kong	2:47:08
9	Caroline Rodgers	United Kingdom	2:47:57
10	Christine Burden	New Caledonia	2:48:38
11	Ngaire Drake	New Zealand	2:48:38
12	Katrina McLean	Cyprus	2:49:00
13	Melanie Jones	United Kingdom	2:49:47
14	Angella Hearn	United Kingdom	2:50:09
15	Leslie Watson	United Kingdom	2:50:23
17	Jacqueline Hulbert	United Kingdom	2:51:03
