= Fred Tumbo =

Kenyan long-distance runner

Fred Mogaka Tumbo (born 18 June 1978) is a Kenyan long-distance runner who specializes in the marathon.

In 2006, he won the silver medal in the marathon at the Commonwealth Games, and finished seventeenth at the inaugural World Road Running Championships.

His personal best time in the half marathon is 1:01:14 hours, achieved in March 2004 in Paris; and his personal best time in the marathon is 2:12:03 hours, achieved at the 2006 Commonwealth Games.

== Achievements ==
Year	Competition	Venue	Position	Event	Notes
Representing Kenya
2004	Paris Half Marathon	Paris, France	1st	Half marathon	1:01:14
2004	Hastings Half Marathon	Hastings, England	1st	Half marathon	1:04:22
2005	Hastings Half Marathon	Hastings, England	1st	Half marathon	1:04:10
2007	Los Angeles Marathon	Los Angeles, United States	1st	Marathon	2:17:14
