= Andrea Green (runner) =

English long-distance runner

Andrea Green (born 14 December 1968) is an English long-distance runner, specialising in the half-marathon. She ran as part of the British team at the 2000 IAAF World Half Marathon Championships, as well as winning a number of domestic races.

Green was selected to run as part of the British women's team in the 2000 IAAF World Half Marathon Championships along with Paula Radcliffe, Marian Sutton, Sue Reinsford and Sarah Young-Wilkinson. In the build-up to the race she won the Bristol Half Marathon in a personal best time, 1:13:28, a minute ahead of Sue Reinsford who was second. Ultimately in the Mexican heat, only herself, Radcliffe, and Young-Wilkinson competed, with Radcliffe winning the race and the team of three finishing sixth.

Green was selected again in 2002 alongside Amanda Wright-Allen but did not compete.

== Competition Record ==
Year	Competition	Venue	Position	Event	Notes
Representing Great Britain
2000	Paddock Wood Half Marathon	Paddock Wood, United Kingdom	1st	Half marathon	1:16:05
2000	Bristol Half Marathon	Bristol, United Kingdom	1st	Half marathon	1:13:28 (PB)
2000	IAAF World Half Marathon Championships	Veracruz, Mexico	45th	Half marathon	1:24:53
2001	Bristol Half Marathon	Bristol, United Kingdom	1st	Half marathon	1:14:56
2001	Hastings Half Marathon	Hastings, United Kingdom	1st	Half marathon	1:17:08
2001	Tunbridge Wells Half Marathon	Tunbridge Wells, United Kingdom	1st	Half marathon	1:15:36
2001	Stroud Half Marathon	Stroud, United Kingdom	1st	Half marathon	1:13:56
2002	Reading Half Marathon	Reading, Berkshire, United Kingdom	1st	Half marathon	1:16:36
2003	The Morpeth	Morpeth, Northumberland, United Kingdom	1st	Half marathon	1:15:36
2013	Milton Keynes Marathon	Milton Keynes, United Kingdom	1st	Marathon	3:04:23
