= Winnie Ng =

Hong Kong athlete (born 1952)

Personal information
- Nationality: Hong Konger
- Born: 7 August 1952 (age 73)

Sport
- Sport: Long-distance running
- Event: Marathon

Winnie Lai Chu Ng (born 7 August 1952) is a Hong Kong long-distance runner. She competed in the women's marathon at the 1984 Summer Olympics. She holds a personal best of 2:42:38 hours for the marathon, set in 1984.

She was the inaugural winner of the Singapore Marathon in 1982 and won the Hong Kong Marathon in both 1980 and 1982. She has also won the Melbourne Marathon (1994), Taipei Marathon (1986) and the Macau Half Marathon (1999, 2001). She has raced at the world's highest level marathons, including the London Marathon, Boston Marathon, New York City Marathon, Tokyo Women's Marathon, Rotterdam Marathon and Nagoya Women's Marathon. Her best performance at that level was eight at the 1982 London Marathon.

She was twice a participant in the marathon at the World Championships in Athletics, finished 23rd in 1993 and 30th in 1995. She was entered for the 1983 World Championships Marathon but did not start the race.

== International competitions ==
Year	Competition	Venue	Position	Event	Notes
1983	World Women's Road Race Championships	San Diego, California	43rd	10K	35:24
1984	Olympic Games	Los Angeles, California	31st	Marathon	2:42:38
1985	World Marathon Cup	Hiroshima, Japan	54th	Marathon	2:54:42
1989	World Marathon Cup	Milan, Italy	47th	Marathon	2:55:04
1993	World Championships	Stuttgart, Germany	23rd	Marathon	2:58:41
1994	World Half Marathon Championships	Oslo, Norway	77th	Half marathon	1:17:37
1995	World Championships	Gothenburg, Sweden	30th	Marathon	3:01:08
2000	Asian Marathon Championships	Pattaya, Thailand	3rd	Marathon	3:09:43
