= Grand 10 Berlin =

- The race starts and ends at Charlottenburg Palace.
- Date: October
- Location: Berlin, Germany
- Event type: Road
- Distance: 10K
- Established: 2008
- Website: Grand 10 Berlin

The Grand 10 Berlin is an annual road running event over ten kilometres which is held in October in Berlin, Germany. It is officially known as the ASICS Grand 10 Berlin due to its sponsorship by the sportswear manufacturer. First held in 2008, the competition is organised by the Berlin Läuft (Berlin Runs) group which also holds the annual Big 25 Berlin race over 25 km.

The race attracts elite level and fun runner participants. There are three distinct competition types at the event: a full 10 km elite and mass race, a 2×5 km road relay for partners and families, and an 800 metres race for children. There were almost 6,500 participants in the Grand 10 Berlin event in 2009.

The race starts and finishes at Charlottenburg Palace in the Charlottenburg district of Berlin. At the beginning of the race, the course goes past Spandauer Damm, onto Otto-Suhr-Allee, then into Ernst-Reuter-Platz. It reaches Straße des 17. Juni then heads south at the Berlin Victory Column. After looping through the Berlin Zoological Garden, the course passes through Budapester Straße, Kantstraße, and then Schloßstraße which leads to the finishing point near Charlottenburg Palace.

Leonard Patrick Komon's course record of 27:12 minutes, set in 2010, is the fastest ever time over the distance in a German competition. Joyce Chepkirui holds the women's race record with her run of 30:37 minutes in 2013.

== Past winners ==
Key: Course record

Edition	Year	Men's winner	Time (m:s)	Women's winner	Time (m:s)
1st	2008	Simon Kasimili (KEN)	28:44	Ulrike Maisch (GER)	34:53
2nd	2009	Jan Kreisinger (CZE)	29:46	Joan Jepkorir Aiyabei (KEN)	33:48
3rd	2010	Leonard Patrick Komon (KEN)	27:12	Agnieszka Gortel (POL)	34:08
4th	2011	Leonard Patrick Komon (KEN)	27:15	Mara Yamauchi (GBR)	32:19
5th	2012	Leonard Patrick Komon (KEN)	27:46	Anna Hahner (GER)	33:50
6th	2013	Leonard Patrick Komon (KEN)	27:48	Joyce Chepkirui (KEN)	30:37
7th	2014	Kinde Atanaw (ETH)	27:49	Joyce Chepkirui (KEN)	31:02
8th	2015	Joshua Kiprui Cheptegei (UGA)	27:50	Gladys Chesire (KEN)	30:41
9th	2016	Zane Robertson (NZL)	27:28	Sarah Lahti (SWE)	31:57
10th	2017	Mathew Kimeli (KEN)	27:32	Alina Reh (GER)	31:35
11th	2018	Vincent Kibet (KEN)	27:21	Alina Reh (GER)	31:23
