= Agnieszka Gortel =

Polish long-distance runner

Medal record

Representing Poland

Polish Championships
Gold medal – first place	Piła 2008	Half marathon
Gold medal – first place	Piła 2009	Half marathon
Gold medal – first place	Piła 2010	Half marathon
Gold medal – first place	Piła 2011	Half marathon
Gold medal – first place	Dębno 2013	Marathon
Silver medal – second place	Warsaw 2012	Half Marathon
Bronze medal – third place	Piła 2007	Half Marathon
Bronze medal – third place	Warsaw 2013	Half Marathon

Agnieszka Gortel-Maciuk (born March 20, 1977) is a Polish long-distance runner, Four times Polish champion at half marathon. At present she represents Polish sports club AKS Chorzów.

She set a personal best to win at the Grand 10 Berlin in October 2010, running 34:08 to cross the line two minutes ahead of runner-up Carina Schipp.

She improved her marathon best to 2:30:28 hours with a runner-up finish at the Cologne Marathon in 2013, but the result was later annulled after her sample taken after the race was found positive for testosterone and DHEA. She subsequently received a two-year doping ban.

== Personal bests ==
- Half marathon 1:12:52 (2010)
- Marathon 2:33:48 (2011)
