= Paddock Wood Half Marathon =

- Date: March/April
- Location: Paddock Wood
- Event type: Road
- Distance: Half marathon
- Established: 1989; 37 years ago
- Course records: 1:05:06 (men); 1:13:25 (women)
- Website: www.paddockwoodhalfmarathon.co.uk

The Paddock Wood Half Marathon is an annual road running event held in Paddock Wood, Kent, United Kingdom. It was first run in 1989 and has taken place every year except 2001 when the race was canceled due to the UK outbreak of Foot-and-mouth disease. The 2020 edition of the race was originally due to take place on Sunday 6 April, due to the COVID-19 pandemic, the decision was taken to postpone the event in March, with Sunday 6 September 2020 as the rescheduled date. The race is organised by Paddock Wood AC.

== Past winners ==
Edition	Year	Date	Time (h:m:s)	Men's winner	Time (h:m:s)	Women's winner
34	2024	3 Mar	1:05:40	Nicholas Torry	1:15:44	Rebecca Bunting
33	2023	12 Mar	1:05:52	Joshua Grace	1:15:41	Chelsea Baker
32	2022	13 Mar	1:04:39	Alexander Leprêtre	1:13:48	Chloe Richardson
31	2021	5 Sep	1:07:51	Nick Dawson	1:21:28	Izzy Coomber
	2020	No Event				
30	2019	7 Apr	1:05:34	Nicholas Torry	1:19:03	Eilidh Bell
29	2018	8 Apr	1:05:18	John Gilbert	1:16:19	Lucy Reid
28	2017	2 Apr	1:08:35	Daniel Gaffney	1:14:07	Tracy Barlow
27	2016	3 Apr	1:09:28	Ben Shearer	1:15:49	Tracy Barlow
26	2015	29 Mar	1:07:09	Toby Lambert	1:22:30	Clare Elms
25	2014	30 Mar	1:05:28	Nicholas Kirui	1:13:25	Tish Jones
24	2013	7 Apr	1:05:06	Frank Tickner	1:20:58	Tina Oldershaw
23	2012	1 Apr	1:09:04	Will MacKay	1:20:23	Tina Oldershaw
22	2011	27 Mar	1:09:01	John Hutchins	1:19:23	Clare Elms
21	2010	11 Apr	1:09:50	William Levett	1:20:02	Tina Oldershaw
20	2009	5 Apr	1:08:43	William Levett	1:20:33	Clare Elms
19	2008	30 Mar	1:10:37	Jamie Atkinson	1:21:09	Tina Oldershaw
18	2007	1 Apr	1:09:33	James Baker	1:20:20	Catherine Wilding
17	2006	2 Apr	1:11:07	Paul Hasler	1:23:48	Sharon Hawkins
16	2005	3 Apr	1:10:47	Biniam Ande	1:25:09	Sharon Hawkins
15	2004	28 Mar	1:08:57	Barry Royden	1:17:43	Alison Fletcher
14	2003		1:10:35	James McGaughey	1:19:35	Debbie Sullivan
13	2002		1:07:46	Barry Royden	1:15:22	Alison Fletcher
	2001	No race held due to foot and mouth				
12	2000		1:07:58	Steve Harris	1:16:05	Andrea Green
11	1999		1:08:25	Gareth Williams	1:22:10	Carol McKinalay Evans
10	1998		1:06:28	Barry Royden	1:22:30	Tina Oldershaw
9	1997		1:07:39	Mark Linbourne	1:25:27	Susan Martin-Clarke
8	1996		1:11:23	Chris Loizou	1:20:46	Janice Moorekite
7	1995		1:08:18	Ryan Parry	1:23:28	Susan Martin-Clarke
6	1994		1:10:27	Jamie Hernon	1:22:21	Bonnie Appleby
5	1993		1:07:48	Vladimir Shtyrts	1:19:18	Susan Martin
4	1992		1:09:35	Seb Shepley	1:24:29	Lesley Taylor
3	1991		1:11:08	Mark Moughton	1:21:01	Susan Martin
2	1990		1:10:01	Jamie Hernon	1:17:12	Bronwen Cardy-Wise
1	1989		1:08:04	Derek Stevens	1:22:16	Susan Martin
