= Hastings Half Marathon =

Road running event in Hastings, England

- Date: March
- Location: Hastings, East Sussex
- Event type: Half Marathon
- Distance: 13.1 miles
- Established: 1985
- Website: http://www.hastings-half.co.uk

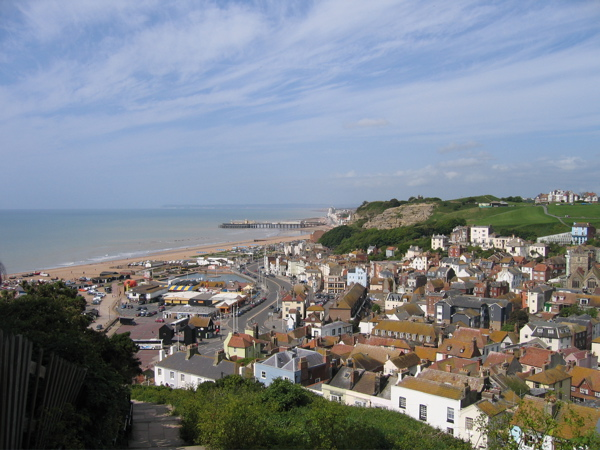
Part of the race goes through the historic old town

The Hastings Half-Marathon is a road running event that takes place every March around the streets of Hastings. Starting in 1985 and organised by The Hastings Lions Club the race has become quite popular over the last few years, with calls for it to be crowned The Great South Run, attracting 5,000 entries every year. It has been voted best race of its kind in the UK for three years. In 2005 it was voted fifth best race in the UK and was voted number 23 in the list of the Top 50 2007 races in the UK by readers of Runners' World. The 39th edition of the half marathon took place on 22 March 2026.

== Course ==
The route has a total climb of 237 metres with an average climb rate of 18 metres per mile. Taking this into account, this route is equivalent to running approximately 14.0 miles (22.5 km) on the flat.

The course circumnavigates the ancient town of Hastings, starting at the Seafront and following the route of William the Conqueror towards Battle, East Sussex, around the back of the town and down to the famous 'Old Town' and fishing village of Hastings, then back along the three-mile (5 km) seafront back to where it started. Although tough for the first part of the course, runners have produced some very fast times and PBs, as the last two-thirds is flat or downhill, and then the finish on the promenade.

== Past winners ==
Key: Course record

Edition	Year	Men's winner	Nation	Time (h:m:s)	Women's winner	Nation	Time (h:m:s)
39th	2026	Seyfu Jamaal	United Kingdom	1:05:16	Charlotte Clarke	United Kingdom	1:17:55
	2025	Cancelled					
38th	2024	Seyfu Jamaal	United Kingdom	1:06:48	Grace Baker	United Kingdom	1:21:13
37th	2023	Charlie Brisley	United Kingdom	1:11:03	Beth Kidger	United Kingdom	1:16:30
36th	2022	James Baker	United Kingdom	1:10:12	Rachael Mulvey	United Kingdom	1:22:22
	2021	Cancelled					
	2020	Cancelled					
35th	2019	Josselin Polini	France	1:10:56	Heather Noone	United Kingdom	1:21:44
34th	2018	Adam Clarke	United Kingdom	1:08:35	Maria Heslop	United Kingdom	1:21:29
33rd	2017	Ben Fish	United Kingdom	1:09:52	Sarah Gruber	United Kingdom	1:26:35
32nd	2016	Robert Mbithi	Kenya	1:04:51	Lenah Jerotich	Kenya	1:16:51
31st	2015	Sammy Nyokaye	Kenya	1:05:27	Mercyline Ondieki	Kenya	1:21:36
30th	2014	Boniface Kongin	Kenya	1:04:18	Gladys Kwambai	Kenya	1:16:42
29th	2013	Peter Emase	Kenya	1:06:58	Polline Wanjiku	Kenya	1:16:39
28th	2012	Bernard Chemugo	Kenya	1:06:17	Jane Muia	Kenya	1:14:10
27th	2011	Gordon Mugi Mahugu	Kenya	1:08:00	Rebby Cherono Koech	Kenya	1:15:13
26th	2010	Ben Fish	United Kingdom	1:07:08	Jessica Macrory	United Kingdom	1:21:31
25th	2009	Kiplimo Kimutai	Kenya	1:02:48	Caroline Hoyte	United Kingdom	1:16:56
24th	2008	Kiplimo Kimutai	Kenya	1:05:24	Magdeline Mukunzi Syombua	Kenya	1:14:20
23rd	2007	Philemon Baaru	Kenya	1:03:22	Birhan Dagne	Ethiopia	1:16:02
22nd	2006	Michael Coleman	United Kingdom	1:06:40	Birhan Dagne	Ethiopia	1:15:50
21st	2005	Fred Mogaka	Kenya	1:04:10	Jo Kelsey	United Kingdom	1:18:19
20th	2004	Fred Mogaka	Kenya	1:04:22	Hawa Hussein	Tanzania	1:19:51
19th	2003	Johnson Mururi	Kenya	1:03:26	Jane Omoro	Kenya	1:11:52
18th	2002	Simon Kasimili	Kenya	1:04:55	Jude Craft	United Kingdom	1:20:17
17th	2001	Stephen Ariga	Kenya	1:04:11	Andrea Green	United Kingdom	1:17:08
16th	2000	Simon Kasimili	Kenya	1:03:45	Esther Kiplagat	Kenya	1:12:19
15th	1999	Sammy Otieno	Kenya	1:01:37	Bronwen Cardy-Wise	United Kingdom	1:22:01
14th	1998	Stephen Kiogora	Kenya	1:02:48	Birhan Dagne	Ethiopia	1:16:30
13th	1997	Ian Cornford	United Kingdom	1:05:44	Carolyn Horne	United Kingdom	1:18:53
12th	1996	Mark Flint	United Kingdom	1:02:55	Debbie Percival	United Kingdom	1:15:05
11th	1995	Samuel Bitok Kibiwot	Kenya	1:03:30	Debbie Percival	United Kingdom	1:20:48
10th	1994	Samuel Bitok Kibiwot	Kenya	1:03:25	Alison Fletcher	United Kingdom	1:21:21
9th	1993	Eamonn Martin	United Kingdom	1:02:52	Andrea Wallace	United Kingdom	1:11:13
8th	1992	William Koech	Kenya	1:02:36	Andrea Wallace	United Kingdom	1:13:15
7th	1991	Paul Evans	United Kingdom	1:03:09	Glynis Penny	United Kingdom	1:18:03
6th	1990	Paul Davies-Hale	United Kingdom	1:03:11	Julie Holland	United Kingdom	1:14:17
5th	1989	Paul Davies-Hale	United Kingdom	1:02:09	Veronique Marot	United Kingdom	1:13:54
4th	1988	David Lewis	United Kingdom	1:03:34	Susan Tooby	United Kingdom	1:13:53
3rd	1987	Tony Graham	United Kingdom	1:10:15	Ann Marie Fox	United Kingdom	1:18:59
2nd	1986	Derek Stevens	United Kingdom	1:06:06	Eva Isaacs	Sweden	1:20:01
1st	1985	Derek Stevens	United Kingdom	1:06:58	Caroline Horne	United Kingdom	1:16:08

- All information from Association of Road Racing Statisticians.
