= Milton Keynes Marathon =

Annual race in the United Kingdom held since 2012

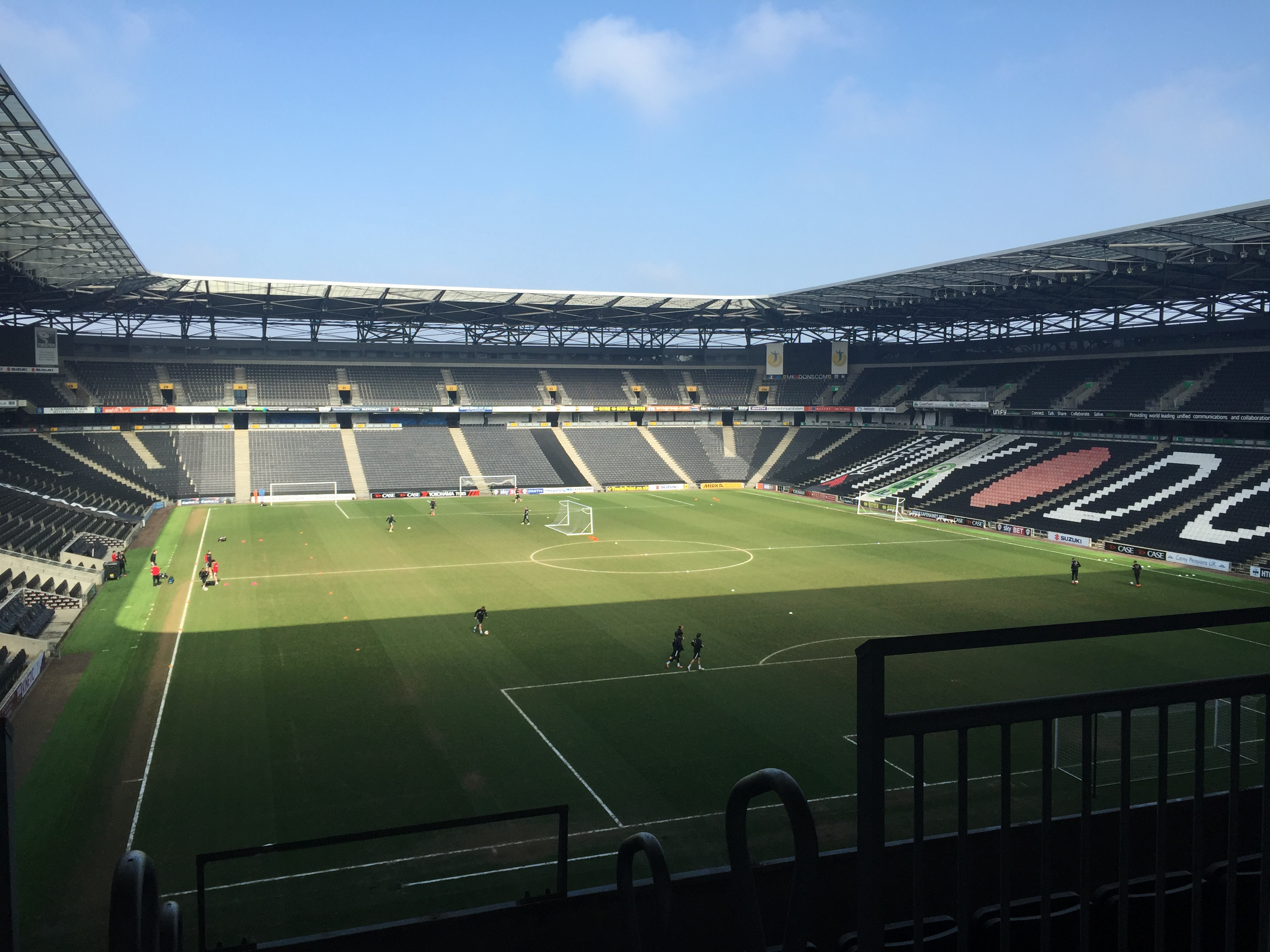
- Stadium MK, in which the marathon finishes
- Date: Early May Bank Holiday
- Location: Milton Keynes, England, U.K.
- Event type: Road
- Distance: Marathon, half marathon, 5K run
- Primary sponsor: Brioche Pasquier
- Established: 2012 (14 years ago)
- Course records: Men's: 2:31:05 (2021) (United Kingdom) Joshua Teece; Women's: 2:52:44 (2021) (United Kingdom) Melissah Gibson
- Website: Milton Keynes Marathon
- Participants: 847 finishers (2021); 120 (2020); 1,841 (2019)

The Milton Keynes Marathon is an annual road marathon and marathon relay event held in Milton Keynes, England on the Spring bank holiday, first held in 2012.

== History ==
The inaugural event was held in April 2012 and attracted 4,400 runners.

The 2012 event was won by Team Mizuno runner Dave Mitchinson with a time of 2:41:54.

In 2013 a kids "Superhero Fun Run" was added to the schedule followed by a half marathon race in 2014 and a 5k "Rocket" race in 2016. The Rocket 5k is held on the preceding Sunday to the Bank Holiday Monday on which the marathon, half marathon, marathon relay and superhero fun run are held.

In 2018 the race weekend attracted 11,000 runners.

The 2020 edition of the race was postponed to 2020.09.06 due to the coronavirus pandemic, with all registrants given the option of either transferring their entry to another runner or to 2021 for free, running the race virtually, or obtaining a full refund.

== Course ==
The start and finish of the event are based at the Stadium MK football stadium, home of Milton Keynes Dons F.C.

Much of the route of the marathon uses the Milton Keynes redway system through the linear parks and thus involves far less of the invariant-grade road running that is typical elsewhere.

== Winners ==
Key: Course record (in bold)

=== Marathon ===
Ed.	Date	Men's winner	Time	Women's winner	Time	Rf.
1	2012.04.29	Dave Mitchinson	2:41:54	Yvette Grice	3:00:35	
2	2013.05.06	Edward Catmur	2:46:59	Andrea Green	3:04:23	
3	2014.05.05	Rick Lloyd	2:43:25	Sarah Hill	3:00:21	
4	2015.05.04	Jack Parslow	2:37:30	Kate Wright	2:58:30	
5	2016.05.02	Ben Fish	2:31:14	Kate Wright	3:03:41	
6	2017.05.01	Gareth Cooke	2:40:08	Asia Zmyslona	2:57:37	
7	2018.05.07	Denys Olefir	2:37:43	Colleen Mukuya	2:57:58	
8	2019.05.06	Michael Aldridge	2:32:48	Helen Mussen	2:54:55	
9	2020.09.06 (Note: The 2020 race had a very limited field because of the continuing COVID-19 pandemic.)	Paul Parkins	3:03:35	Petra Gowans	3:29:02	
10	2021.06.27	Joshua Teece	2:31:05	Melissah Gibson	**2:52:44**	
11	2022.05.02	Michael Young	**2:29:36**	Georgina Povall	2:57:46	
12	2023.05.01	Alan Darby	2:30:30	Sarah Hoskin	2:53:56	
13	2024.05.06	Tom Hollis	2:37:18	Amy Dixon	3:03:04	

=== Half marathon ===
Ed.	Date	Men's winner	Time	Women's winner	Time	Rf.
1	2014.05.05	Ismail Ssenyange	**1:08:38**	Jane Ovington	1:23:01	
2	2015.05.04	Marcus Engstrom	1:15:27	Sophie Carter	1:18:59	
3	2016.05.02	Steve Way	1:09:53	Sophie Carter	1:25:29	
4	2017.05.01	David Hudson	1:14:16	Rebecca Moore	**1:16:50**	
5	2018.05.07	Michael Aldridge	1:13:02	Johanna O'Regan	1:25:33	
6	2019.05.06	Jordan Clay	1:10:57	Rebecca Butler	1:28:48	
7	2020.09.06	Mark Brinsley	1:33:06	Susie Leggett	1:38:18	
8	2021.06.26	Steven Tuttle	1:15:10	Cordelia Parker	1:24:36	
9	2022.05.02	Ayoub Saji	1:11:28	Elizabeth Nairn	1:25:43	
10	2023.05.01	David Brewis	1:14:02	Rose Penfold	1:23:24	
11	2024.05.06	Ugur Altan	1:11:12	Grace Tongue	1:23:10	
