= International street run Komárno – Komárom =

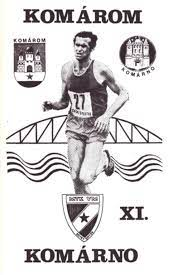
- Date: April
- Location: Komárno, Slovakia Komárom, Hungary
- Event type: Road
- Distance: 10 km
- Established: 1975 (51 years ago)

The Komárno - Komárom International Street Run is a run traditionally held between the Slovak Komárno and Hungarian Komárom between April and May.

== History ==
On March 30, 1945, the Red Army liberated the territory of north Hungary and Slovakia from the towns of Komárno and Komárom, ending World War II on their territory.

At the end of 1974, based on the idea of three athletes (Dezső Bangha, Gyula Herczeg and István Jóny), a report appeared that the following year, April 4, on the occasion of the 30th anniversary of the liberation of Hungary and Czechoslovakia, a running competition between Komárno and Komárom was being considered. The ideas were organized by Endre Rubin, President of the Athletics Department of MTK-VM, and the District Committee of the Czechoslovak Association of Physical Education in Komárno, on the Czechoslovak side. The first run took place in 1975. 65 Hungarian and 18 Czechoslovak runners took part in the start of the 8,200-meter-long track at Lenin's Stadium in Komárom.

From the following year, the competition was also included in the calendar of competitions of the European Athletic Association. Starting and finishing stations alternated every year, in the first year the competitors started from the north side and came to the finish line from the south side, while in 1976 they started in Komárom and the race ended in Komárno. This tradition was maintained in the following years. The competition was organized by an international organizing committee set up for this purpose. The committee consisted of the heads of local authorities, sports associations.

In 1977, in addition to Hungarian and Czechoslovak athletes, Romanian, Yugoslav, East German and for the first time ever West German athletes from behind the Iron Curtain also took part.

The 1980 competition was the first to announce a special competition for women at a distance of 4,000 meters. As early as 1982, winners were announced in male adult individuals and teams, in female adults and young people, and in the male youth categories.

Almost a thousand runners have already been registered for the tenth anniversary of 1984. Although the magic line was not exceeded in the following year, from 1986 until the regime change, more than a thousand starters came to the starting line every year.

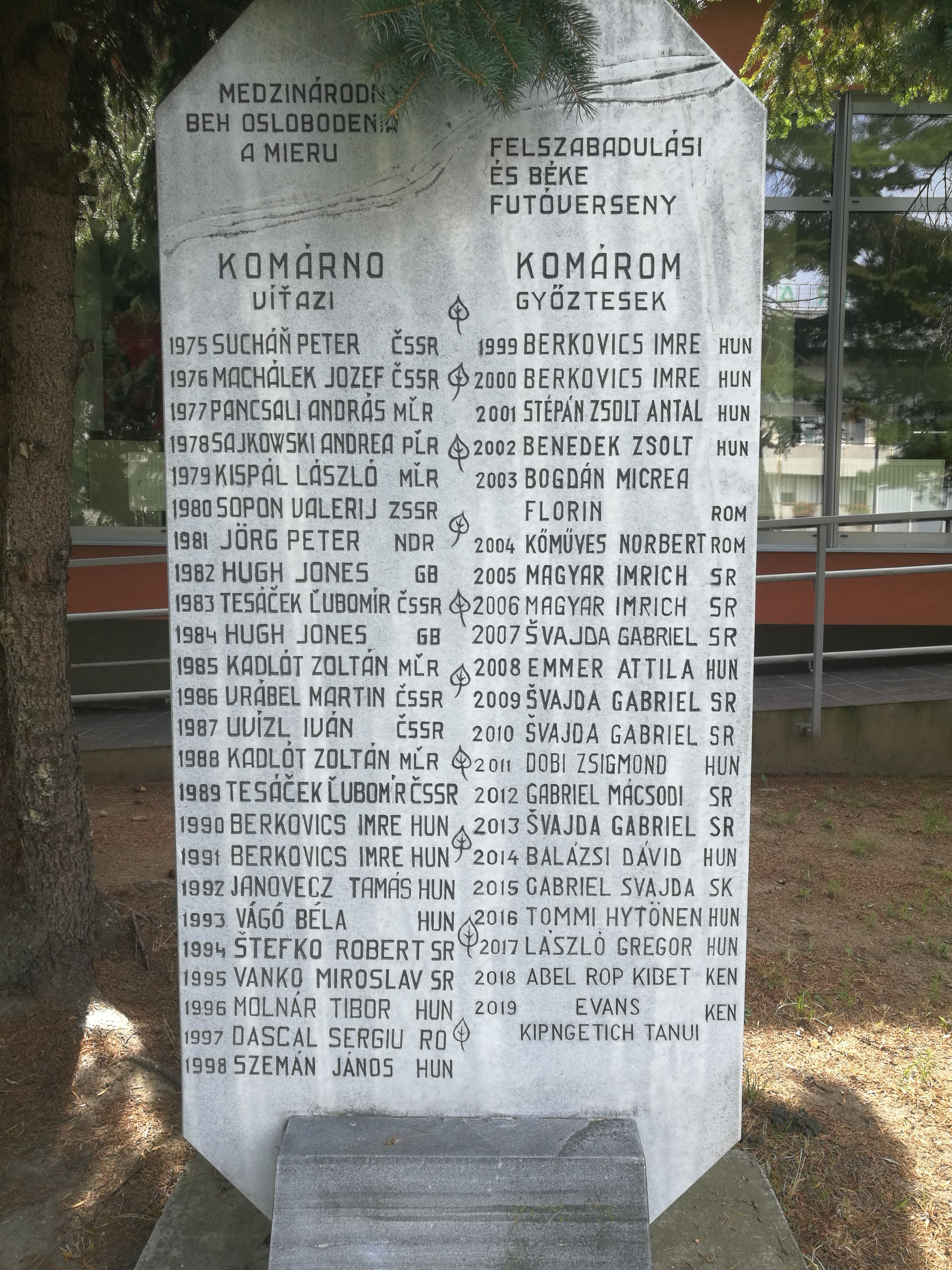
Engraved names of the winners in front of the sports hall in Komárno.

After the change of regime, the idea of liberation by the Red Army was abandoned, but the run continued during the Komárno Days, this time officially on the occasion of the revolutionary battles for the Komárno fortress in 1849. Participation is smaller and without major athletes.

== Track ==
The running track is flat and leads over the bridge of the border river Danube, between Komárno (Slovakia) and Komárom (Hungary). The start and finish vary between Hungary and Slovakia. The length of the track is approximately 10 km.

== List of winners ==
	Men	Women
1975	Peter Sucháň (TCH)	No race for women
1976	Jozef Machálek (TCH)	No race for women
1977	András Pancsal (HUN)	No race for women
1978	Andrea Sajkowski (POL)	No race for women
1979	László Kispál (HUN)	No race for women
1980	Valerij Sopon (SOV)	Antónia Ladányiné Schaffner (25x17px)
1981	Peter Jörg (GDR)	Antónia Ladányiné Schaffner (25x17px)
1982	Hugh Jones (GBR)	Antónia Ladányiné Schaffner (25x17px)
1983	Ľubomír Tesáček (TCH)	Ilona Jankó (25x17px)
1984	Hugh Jones (GBR)	Erika Vastag (25x17px)
1985	Zoltán Kadlót (HUN)	Karolina Szabó (25x17px)
1986	Martin Vábel (TCH)	Ágnes Sipka (25x17px)
1987	Ivan Uvizl (TCH)	Enikő Bakos (25x17px)
1988	Zoltán Kadlót (HUN)	Alena Močáriová (25x17px)
1989	Ľubomír Tesáček (TCH)	Alena Močáriová (25x17px)
1990	Imre Benkovics (HUN)	Alena Močáriová (25x17px)
1991	Imre Benkovics (HUN)	Alena Močáriová (25x17px)
1992	Tamás Janovecz (HUN)	Anikó Javos (25x17px)
1993	Béla Vágó (HUN)	Éva Dóczi (25x17px)
1994	Robert Štefko (SVK)	Simona Staicu (25x17px)
1995	Miroslav Vanko (SVK)	Kornélia Pásztor (25x17px)
1996	Tibor Molnár (HUN)	Kornélia Pásztor (25x17px)
1997	Sergiu Dascal (ROU)	Anikó Kálovics (25x17px)
1998	János Szemán (HUN)	Simona Staicu (25x17px)
1999	Imre Benkovics (HUN)	Erika Csomor (25x17px)
2000	Imre Benkovics (HUN)	Simona Staicu (25x17px)
2001	Zsolt Antal Stepán (HUN)	Simona Staicu (25x17px)
2002	Zsolt Benedek (HUN)	Dana Janecková (25x17px)
2003	Mircea Florin Bognánl (ROU)	Anikó Kálovics (25x17px)
2004	Norbert Kőműves (HUN)	Anikó Kálovics (25x17px)
2005	Imrich Magyar (SVK)	Krisztina Protič (25x17px)
2006	Imrich Magyar (SVK)	Jana Styková (25x17px)
2007	Gabriel Švajda (SVK)	Zuzana Nováčková (25x17px)
2008	Attila Emmer (HUN)	Zita Fertály (25x17px)
2009	Gabriel Švajda (SVK)	Zuzana Nováčková (25x17px)
2010	Gabriel Švajda (SVK)	Zuzanna Vadkerti (25x17px)
2011	Zsigmend Dobi (HUN)	Zuzanna Vadkerti (25x17px)
2012	Gabriel Mácso (SVK)	Tímea Szabó (25x17px)
2013	Gabriel Švajda (SVK)	Marek Ancsin (25x17px)
2014	Dávid Balázsi (HUN)	Jana Kováčová (25x17px)
2015	Gabriel Švajda (SVK)	Jana Rosicková (25x17px)
2016	Tommi Hytönen (HUN)	Dorottya Varga (HUN)
2017	László Gregor (HUN)	Zita Kácser (HUN)
2018	Rop Abel Kibet (KEN)	Hellen Jepkosgei Kimatai (KEN)
2019	Evans Kipngetich Tanui (KEN)	Jane Ngima Mbogo (KEN)
2020	Cancelled due to COVID-19	
2021	Cancelled due to COVID-19	
2022	Gergő Szarka (SVK)	Zita File (HUN)
2023	Albert Kipkorir Tonui (KEN)	Zita File (HUN)
2024	Máté Vásárhelyi (HUN)	Anna Szekeres (HUN)
2025	Donát Rózsavölgyi (HUN)	Barbara Molnár (HUN)
