= Kiplimo Kimutai =

Kenyan long-distance runner (born 1981)

Kiplimo Kimutai (born December 10, 1981) is a male long-distance runner from Kenya.

== Achievements ==
Year	Competition	Venue	Position	Event	Notes
2008	Hastings Half Marathon	Hastings, United Kingdom	1st	Half marathon	1:05:24
2009	Hastings Half Marathon	Hastings, United Kingdom	1st	Half marathon	1:02:50
2009	Reading Half Marathon	Reading, United Kingdom	1st	Half marathon	1:02:46
2009	IAAF World Half Marathon Championships	Birmingham, United Kingdom	7th	Half marathon	1:01:31
2012	Toronto Waterfront Marathon	Toronto, Canada	2nd	Marathon	2:11:20
2013	Buenos Aires Half Marathon	Buenos Aires, Argentina	1st	Half marathon	1:02:52
2016	Palmira COL Media Maratón	Palmira, Colombia	1st	Half Marathon	1:02:52
