= Hugh Jones (runner) =

British long-distance runner

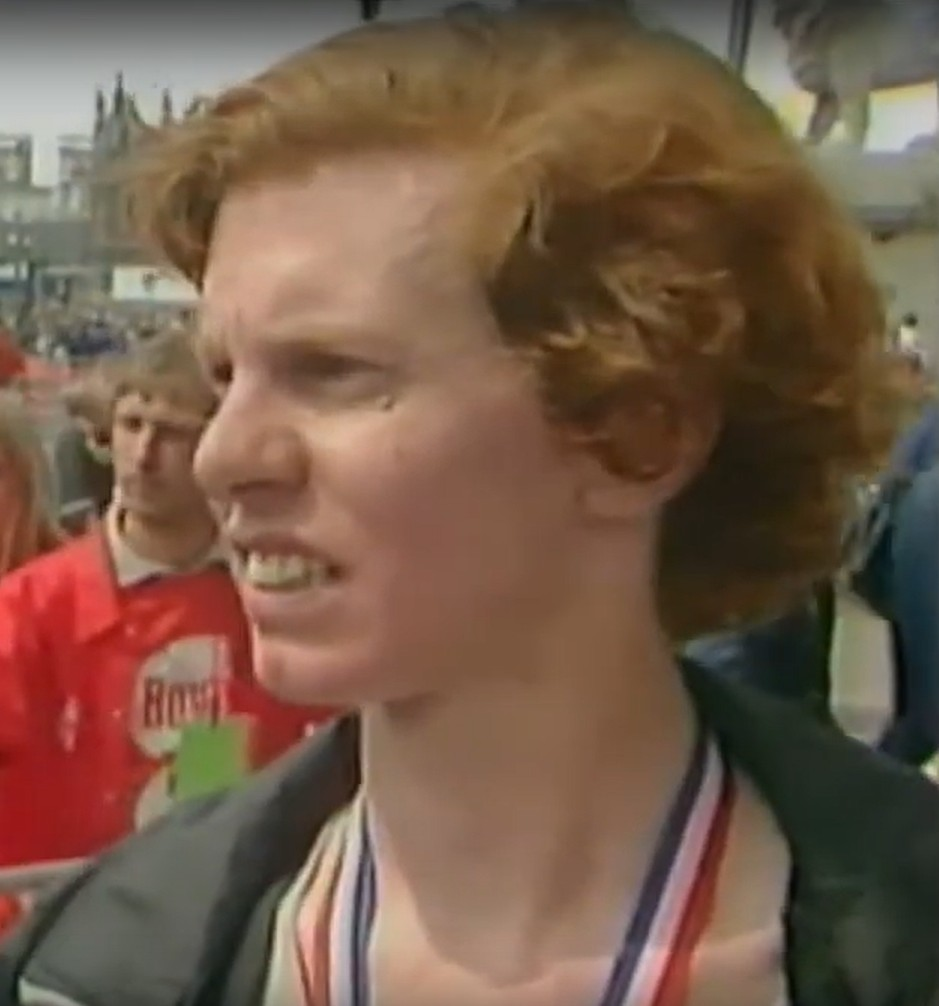
- Hugh Jones after London Marathon 1982

Personal information
- Nationality: British
- Born: 1 November 1955 (age 70) London, England, United Kingdom
- Height: 180 cm (5 ft 11 in)
- Weight: 64 kg (141 lb)

Sport
- Sport: Athletics
- Event: long-distance/marathon
- Club: Ranelagh Harriers

Robin Evan Hugh Jones (born 1 November 1955) is a British retired long-distance runner. He competed at the 1984 Summer Olympics and won the 1982 London Marathon.

== Biography ==
Jones was born in London, and attended Latymer Upper School in Hammersmith, where he began competing in long-distance running both for the school and for Ranelagh Harriers, and the University of Liverpool.

Jones became the British marathon champion after winning the British AAA Championships title at the 1981 AAA Championships.

In 1982 Jones won the London Marathon, finishing in a time of 2:09:24. His personal best is 2:09:24, set in London 1982. In 1983 he finished a close second to Joseph Nzau in the Chicago Marathon and won the Stockholm Marathon with a time of 2:11:37, for twenty years the course record.

At the 1984 Olympic Games in Los Angeles, he represented Great Britain in the men's marathon and finished 12th, with a time of 2:13:57. Jones was the British champion again as the highest placed British athlete in both the 1986 London Marathon and the 1987 London Marathon.

He won the Stockholm Marathon again in 1992 (2:15:58) was second in 1993 (2:17:29) and seventh in 1994 (2:18:20).

Jones became the Secretary of the Association of International Marathons and Distance Races (AIMS) in July 1996, succeeding Andy Galloway. Jones currently holds this position as well as the editorship of AIMS' Distance Running magazine which he started in 2000. Jones was president of the Road Runners Club from 2007 to 2011. Jones lives in London with his wife, Cheryl, his son, Nathan, and his three daughters, Holly, Coral and Ella.

== Competition record ==
Year	Competition	Venue	Position	Event	Notes
1981	Oslo Marathon	Oslo, Norway	1st	Marathon	2:13:06
1981	New York City Marathon	New York City, United States	3rd	Marathon	2:10:59
1982	City-Pier-City Loop	The Hague, Netherlands	1st	Half Marathon	1:01:06
1982	London Marathon	London, United Kingdom	1st	Marathon	2:09:24
1982	International street run Komárno – Komárom	Komárno, Czechoslovakia; Komárom, Hungary	1st	10km	0:29:25
1983	Stockholm Marathon	Stockholm, Sweden	1st	Marathon	2:11:37
1983	World Championships	Helsinki, Finland	8th	Marathon	2:11:15
1983	Chicago Marathon	Chicago, United States	2nd	Marathon	2:09:45
1984	Olympic Games	Los Angeles, United States	12th	Marathon	2:13:57
1984	International street run Komárno – Komárom	Komárno, Czechoslovakia; Komárom, Hungary	1st	10km	0:29:40
1986	London Marathon	London, United Kingdom	2nd	Marathon	2:11:42
1986	European Championships	Stuttgart, West Germany	5th	Marathon	2:11:49
1987	London Marathon	London, United Kingdom	3rd	Marathon	2:10:11
1987	World Championships	Rome, Italy	5th	Marathon	2:12:54
1988	London Marathon	London, United Kingdom	4th	Marathon	2:11:08
1992	Stockholm Marathon	Stockholm, Sweden	4th	Marathon	2:15:58
1995	Reykjavík Marathon	Reykjavík, Iceland	1st	Marathon	2:29:26
