= Rosie Swale-Pope =

British explorer

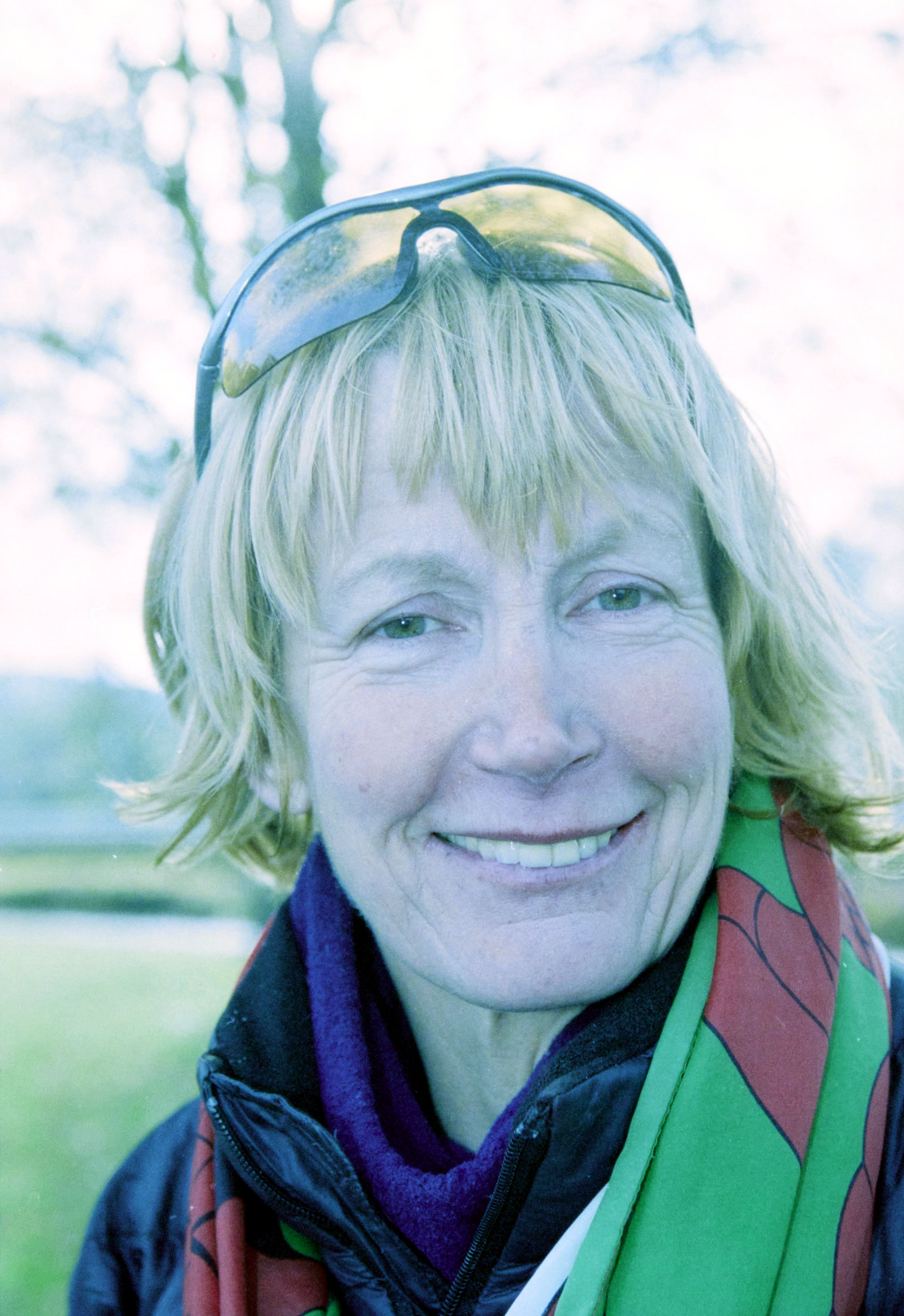
- Swale-Pope in 2003
- Born: Rosie Griffin; 2 October 1946 (age 80); Davos, Switzerland
- Occupations: Writer, adventurer, marathon runner
- Title: MBE
- Children: Eve and James

Rosie Swale-Pope, MBE (born 2 October 1946) is a British author, adventurer and marathon runner. She successfully completed a five-year around-the-world run, raising £250,000 for a charity that supports orphaned children in Russia and to highlight the importance of early diagnosis of prostate cancer. Her other achievements include sailing single-handed across the Atlantic in a small boat, and trekking 3,000 miles (4,800 km) alone through Chile on horseback.

== Early life ==
Rosie Swale-Pope was born Rosie Griffin in Davos, Switzerland. Her Swiss mother was suffering from tuberculosis, and her Irish father Major Ronald Peter Griffin was serving in the Royal Engineers (part of the British Army), so she was brought up by the wife of the local postman. She was two when her mother died, and she went to live with her paternal grandmother, named Carlie Ponsonby, who was bedridden with osteoarthritis, in New Bridge, Askeaton in County Limerick, Ireland.

When she was five, her father remarried and moved to Ireland, with his French wife Marriane Griffin. They had four children, Maude, Gerald, Nicholas and Ronnie. Although they were only in the next cottage, Swale stayed with her grandmother and looked after four orphaned donkeys, seven goats, and a pet cow called Cleopatra. Swale learnt to ride, often going out on her black horse Columbine all day exploring the countryside.

Her grandmother was very religious and worried that the local school would be a bad influence, so Swale-Pope was schooled at home. Although her coursework mostly consisted of simply writing about what she had done each day, it proved to be useful training for her later writing about her travels and adventures.

Her father died in 1957, and when she was thirteen, Swale-Pope was sent to a strict boarding school for girls in Cork.

Aged 18, her first job was as a reporter for a regional newspaper, the Surrey Advertiser. This did not last long; she then hitch-hiked to Delhi, Nepal and Russia, with almost no money or luggage.

Rosie was married to Colin Swale in her early twenties. They originally lived in a small flat in London, but when their daughter Eve was born, they bought a 30-foot (9 m) catamaran (named the Anneliese, in memory of Rosie's sister whom she only knew from a photo) and sailed to Italy, where Rosie's son James was born on board the boat.

== Sailing round the world ==
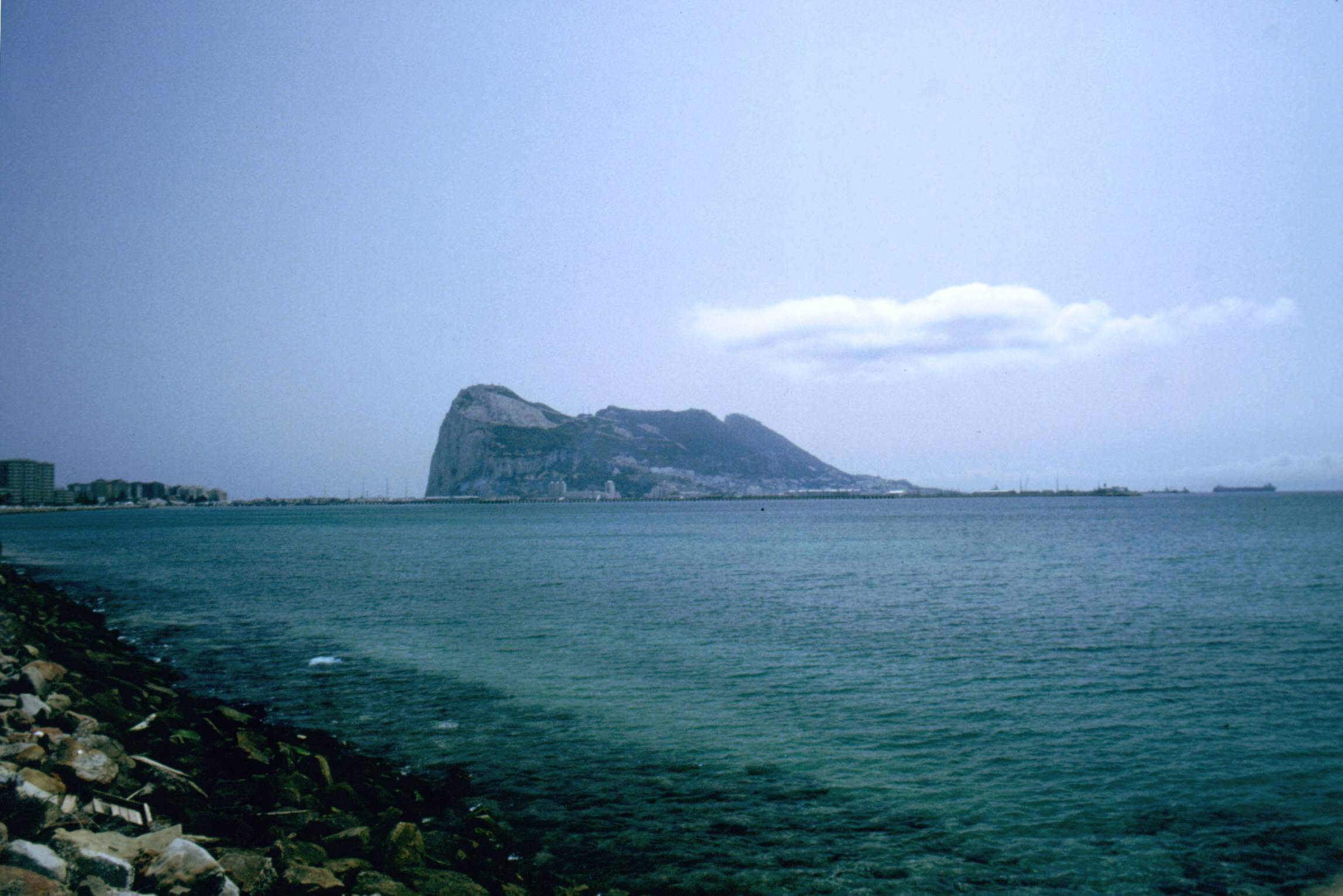
Gibraltar, where the voyage began

Beginning in December 1971, Swale sailed around the world from Gibraltar via Australia, with husband Colin and daughter Eve on the Anneliese. The trip was part-sponsored by the Daily Mail newspaper and also by ITN (Independent Television News), which provided them with a camera to record their own news reports of the journey. They sailed 30,000 miles (48,300 km) across the Atlantic Ocean, through the Panama Canal and across the Pacific, stopping at the Galapagos Islands, the Marquesas, Tahiti and Tonga, before reaching Australia in 1973. They were the first catamaran crew to round Cape Horn.

Although both Swale and her husband were able to sail and had prepared as well as they could, the trip had its risks, and it nearly ended in disaster three times: when Rosie fell overboard in the Caribbean 900 miles (1,450 km) from the closest land; again when she needed emergency medical treatment in hospital; and a third time when the whole family suffered food poisoning from a meal of insufficiently cooked beans. The hardships were survived, however, and the voyage was a significant navigational achievement, using only an old Spitfire compass, nautical charts and a sextant, in the days before GPS. By the time the family finally returned to Plymouth, Rosie had not only completed her first book, Rosie Darling (often working below decks on her typewriter for up to six hours at a time), but had also written her second book, Children of Cape Horn.

== Atlantic crossing ==
In 1983, Rosie Swale sailed solo across the Atlantic in a small 17-foot (5.2 m) cutter, which she had found in a cowshed in Wales and named Fiesta Girl. Aiming to become the fourth woman to sail alone to America in a small boat from England (the first being Ann Davison in 1952–1953, followed by Nicolette Milnes-Walker in 1972 and Clare Francis in 1973), she also wanted to raise funds for a CAT Scanner for the Royal Marsden Hospital in London. Divorced from Colin Swale, Rosie also found her second husband, sailor and photographer Clive Pope, during the preparations for the trip, when he rigged the boat for her.

Departing from Pembroke in Wales on 13 July 1983, she sailed to the Azores and Caribbean Islands. Simply equipped, Rosie navigated by the stars and was nearly run down by an oil tanker. When she was 100 miles (160 km) north of Puerto Rico, she was becalmed for so long she was without food and water for five days and nearly drowned when she was swept overboard in storms. She arrived at Staten Island, New York, after completing her record-breaking 4,800 miles (7,720 km) in 70 days – navigating by the stars with the aid of her Timex watch.

== Chile on horseback ==
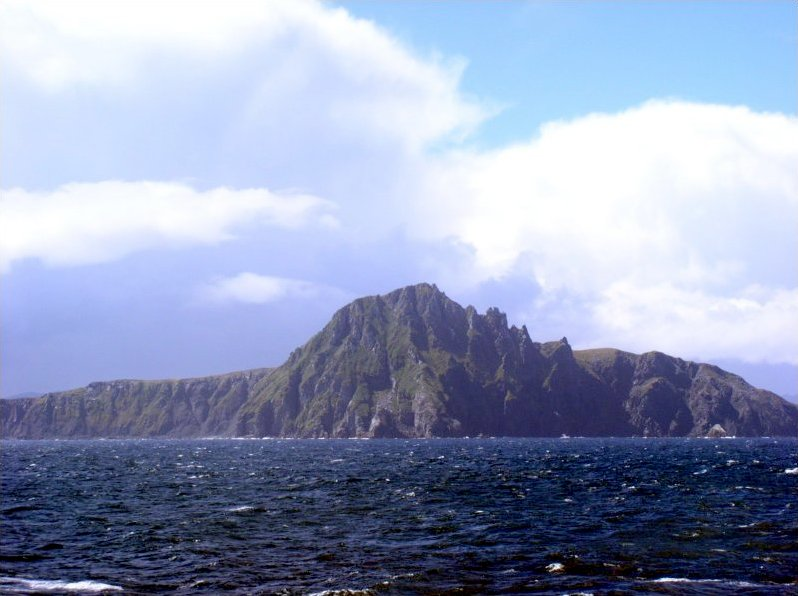
Cape Horn, in Chile, at the southern tip of South America

A year after returning from her Atlantic crossing, Rosie decided that she really wanted to see Cape Horn again and decided to plan a trek 3,000 miles (4,830 km) through Chile on horseback. The journey took her from the northern port of Antofagasta to Cape Horn, and she rode two Chilean Aculeos horses, named 'Hornero' and 'Jolgorio'. From the Hacienda Los Lingues, the horses of the Aculeo Stables were originally brought to Chile by the Spanish Conquistadors in 1492.

Leaving Antofagasta on 22 July 1984, Rosie had secured the protection of General César Mendoza, who was the head of Chile's Military Police (and later the leader of the military junta there). An Olympic horseman, Mendoza provided her with an armed escort for the first stage. The whole trip was planned to take four months but actually took fourteen. In the first week of her journey, Rosie was caught in a desert sandstorm that scattered the horses and all her equipment. Later she fell from one of the horses and broke two ribs. She also faced starvation when she became lost in the southern rain forests and ran out of food. Delayed by bad weather, Rosie arrived at Cape Horn on 2 September 1985, a total of 409 days after she had set out. Rosie wrote of her experiences in Chile in her book Back to Cape Horn in 1986.

== Walks, runs and marathons ==
=== Walk around Wales ===
On 25 September 1987, Rosie set off from the beach near her home in Tenby to walk around Wales in winter. She was carrying everything she needed, including a small tent to sleep in, and was supported by her husband Clive, who also walked with her when other commitments permitted. Rosie completed 1,375 miles (2,213 km) on foot and wrote about her experiences in her book Winter Wales.

=== London Marathon ===
In 1995 Rosie ran her first London Marathon in a time of six hours and described it as her most memorable sporting moment.

=== Sahara run ===
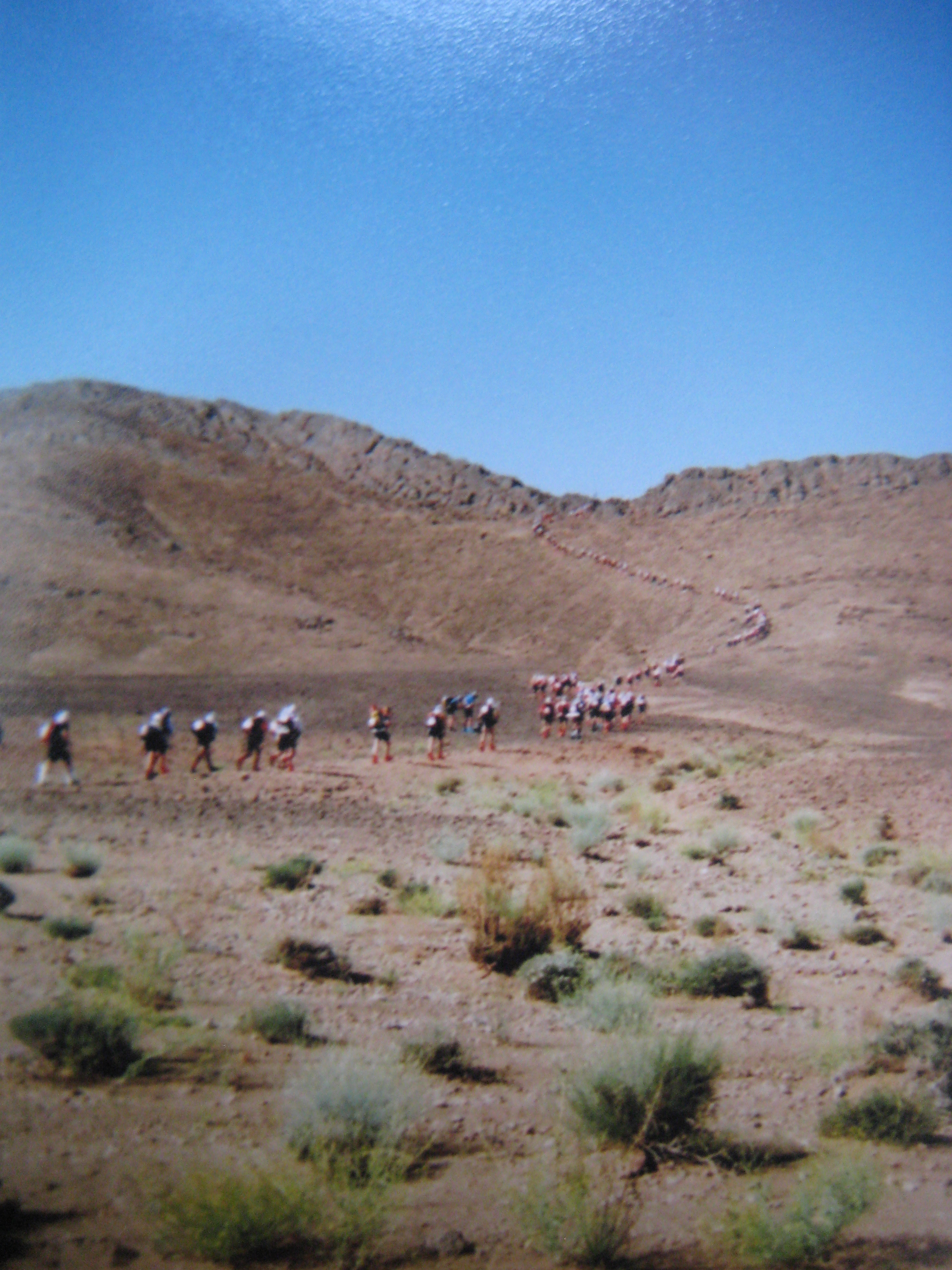
Racers at a large ridge in the Marathon des Sables.

In 1997 Rosie ran 243 km (151 mi) across the Sahara desert in the Sahara marathon. Described as 'the toughest footrace on earth', the 'Marathon des Sables' is run over six days and is the equivalent of five and a half normal marathons. Like all the other competitors, Rosie had to carry everything she needed on her back in a rucksack. She ran across the Sahara a second time in 2000.

=== Romania run ===
In the same year, Rosie ran through Romania to the Hungarian border.

=== Iceland run ===
Rosie ran 1,000 miles (1,610 km) solo across Iceland in 1999. The run took her from the Arctic Circle to the capital, Reykjavík.

=== South Africa Ultramarathons ===
To mark the millennium, in 2000 Rosie Swale successfully completed the challenging Comrades Marathon, one of the world's oldest and largest ultramarathons, run over a distance of approximately 90 km (56 mi) between the capital of the Kwazulu-Natal Province of South Africa, Pietermaritzburg, and the coastal city of Durban. The direction of the race alternates each year between the up run starting from Durban and the down run starting from Pietermaritzburg. Equivalent to running two marathons, Rosie Swale-Pope completed it in 11 hours 1 minute 1 second. She was awarded a bronze medal for completing the race, which has been described as the roadrunner's equivalent to climbing Mount Everest.

=== Albania run ===
In 2000 Rosie ran through the Balkans from Macedonia. It was a dangerous run, and she was held up at gunpoint but managed to escape to reach the border. She flew into Skopje on 11 April 2001 and ran across the then-closed border into Kosovo, then across a closed border through Montenegro, where she ran for twenty-four hours, through deserted villages and deep snow until she reached northern Albania.

=== Cuba run ===
On 8 November 2001, Rosie set off to run 1,360 miles (2,190 km) across Cuba. It took 46 days and she was running the marathon distance every day (and several nights) with a 12 kilograms (26 lb) rucksack on her back and camping in a lightweight bivouac. She lived on rice and sugar cane and had to avoid the Cuban Police, who were concerned for her safety. She also entered and completed the Havana Marathon, finishing in 4 hours and 52 minutes. Crossing from West to East, and running alone to raise money for the charity Age Concern, the straight-line distance was 750 miles (1,210 km), but Rosie covered over 1,000 miles (1,610 km), camping by the side of the road and in the jungle. The run took almost seven weeks. She reached the Punta de Maisi lighthouse, her finish point, on Christmas Day 2001.

=== Cardiff Marathon ===
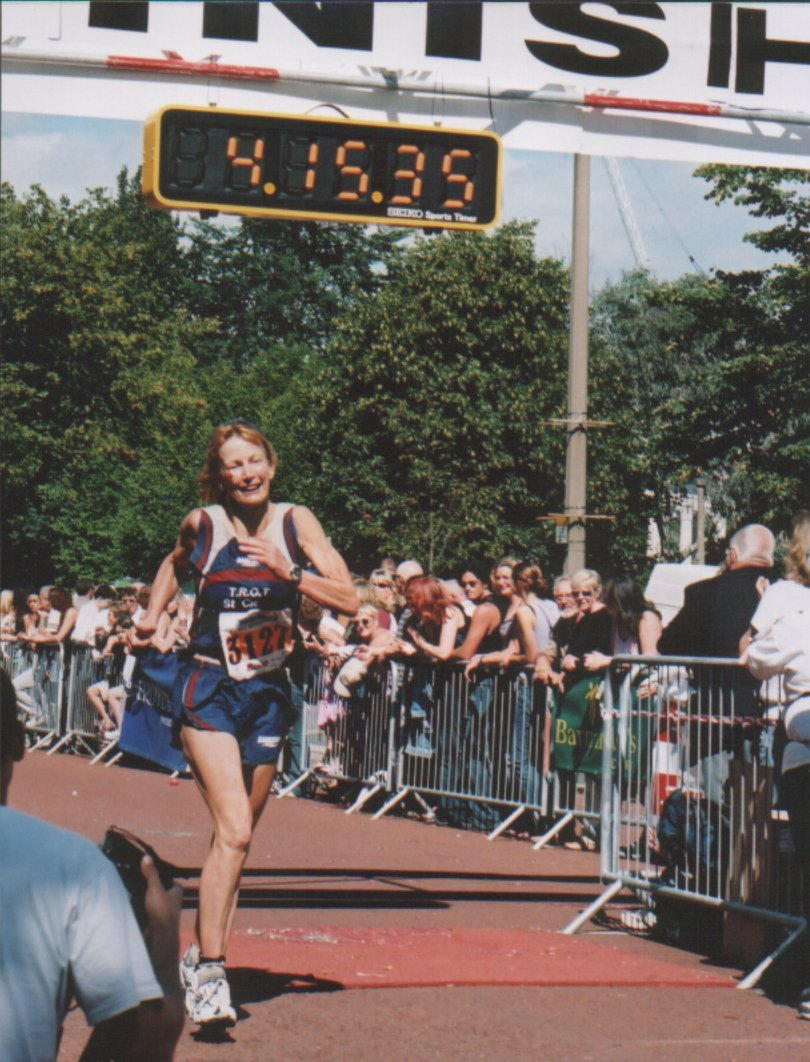
Rosie completing Cardiff Marathon in 2002.

Rosie ran the Marathon in Cardiff in 2002, in aid of her local Hospital in West Wales where her husband Clive had died of prostate cancer ten weeks before. She finished in a time of 4.15.35 (h.m.s), despite a nasty fall six miles (9.7 km) from the finishing line, and received the award for the fastest 55-year-old competitor.

=== Nepal run ===
In April 2003 Rosie ran across Nepal to raise money for the Nepal Trust, a small charity which carries out development work in the remote rural areas of northwest Nepal in a region referred to as the 'Hidden Himalayas'. The journey from one end of Nepal to the other was 1,700 kilometres (1,060 mi) and established a new world-record time of 68 days. Rosie also raised over US$8000 which was used to help sponsor a health camp at the district headquarters of Simikot, Humla.

=== Running around the world ===
When her second husband, Clive, 73, died of prostate cancer in 2002, Rosie decided to run around the world to raise money for the Prostate Cancer Charity and an orphanage in Kitezh, Russia which provides children with education and care.

Her aim was to run around the northern hemisphere taking in as much land mass as possible, with no support crew and just minimal supplies and sponsorship. Rosie started from her home town of Tenby in Wales on her 57th birthday, 2 October 2003, where her first footfall is engraved in a flagstone on her front step. Equipped with just a small specially designed cart of food and basic camping equipment, the trip was funded by renting out her cottage. By 5 April 2004, she reached Moscow, Russia, and on 15 September 2005, she reached Magadan in far eastern Russia. After facing extreme conditions in the Alaskan Winter, she reached the road again on 17 April 2006, and in October 2006, she was in Edmonton, Canada. Four years after the departure, on 2 October 2007, she reached New York City, US.

She ran harnessed to her cart, which was designed for sleeping, shelter and storage. Her son James maintained a website that was followed closely by her supporters and provided regular updates and messages about her progress. Her supporter Geoff Hall organised supplies and equipment to reach her around the world. In the Faroes, she took part in an organised midnight hike to take in the scenery. She also gave cultural talks while on the road, and described how she met a naked man with a gun, how Siberian wolves ran with her for a week, and taking a break to run the Chicago Marathon along the way.

Surviving on minimal rations, Rosie fell ill near Lake Baikal in Russia, possibly from a tick bite, and wandered into the path of a bus. She was knocked unconscious and taken in the bus to hospital. In Alaska, she had to cope with temperatures of −60 °F (−51.1 °C) and nearly froze in her sleeping bag at night. She was stuck in a blizzard by the Yukon River and got severe frostbite of her foot. She had no alternative but to call friends in Wales for help, who then called the Alaskan National Guard, who helped her get the frostbite treated, so she could continue on her run.

She left Canada by air from St John's (Newfoundland) on 24 January 2008, to make a short visit to Greenland before flying to Iceland on 9 February 2008, and continued running to eastern Iceland. While running, she slipped on the ice, breaking several ribs and cracking her hip. She was over a hundred miles (160 km) from the nearest house from where she fell and had to walk two miles (3.2 km), with her injuries, before she was found and got medical attention.

On 18 June 2008, she arrived at Scrabster, in Scotland's far north, by ferry from Iceland, and ran from Scrabster back home to Tenby. Rosie successfully completed the journey, and despite stress fractures in both legs, which turned the final few miles back to Tenby into a hobble on crutches, she returned to her home on 25 August 2008, at 14:18 local time. A large crowd of Tenby residents and Bank Holiday visitors turned out to witness her return and welcome her home. Her distance travelled was 32,000 kilometres (19,900 mi).

Swale wrote a book about her experiences entitled Just a Little Run Around the World: 5 Years, 3 Packs of Wolves and 53 Pairs of Shoes, which was released on 28 May 2009.

The British progressive rock band Big Big Train's song The Passing Widow (from the 2017 album The Second Brightest Star) was written about Swale's round-the-world run.

=== Chicago Marathon ===
While running around the world, she took a break from it during a week after having reached Edmonton, Canada. She took part in the 2006 Chicago Marathon, to which she was invited in order to support charity work. The marathon race took 4:40. After the race, she flew back to Edmonton and continued running around the world.

=== Ireland Run ===
In September 2009, Rosie Swale Pope ran 236 miles (380 km) along the east coast of Ireland, from Rosslare to the Giant's Causeway, pulling her cart which she named 'Icebird' to highlight the importance of cancer awareness. She completed the run on her birthday, 2 October 2009 and the anniversary of setting out on her round-the-world run in 2003, and said that the Wicklow Mountains were one of her toughest challenges.

=== Run across America ===
In 2015 Rosie began running 3,371 miles across America, from New York to San Francisco.

== Honours and Patronage ==
Swale-Pope was awarded an MBE for her charity work in the 2008/9 new year honours list. Queen Elizabeth II presented her with the MBE. Paul Harris Fellowship Rotary International. Margarette Golding Award. Fellow of the RSGS. Citation from Governor of New Jersey on completion of solo transatlantic voyage. Swale-Pope is a patron of PHASE (Practical Help Achieving Self Empowerment) Worldwide, an organisation that works with disadvantaged communities in extremely isolated Himalayan villages in Nepal.

== TV presenting ==
In 1990, Swale presented Channel 4's documentary film Revenge of the Rain Gods, directed by Simon Normanton, about her journey around the Maya World. In the documentary, Swale explores Mayan ruins and meets surviving Mayan communities, which cameraman Desmond Seal described as 'a very wet trip around the edge of the Caribbean, Guatemala, Belize and Mexico'.

== Published works ==
Title	Publisher	Published	ISBN
Rosie Darling	Macmillan	1973	978-0330240000
Children of Cape Horn	HarperCollins	1974	978-0236177134
Libras Don't Say No	Elek (Paul) (Scientific Books) Ltd	1980	978-0583134651
Back to Cape Horn	HarperCollins Publishers Ltd	1986	978-0002174152
Winter Wales	Golden Grove	1989	978-1870876162
Just a Little Run Around the World	HarperTrue	2009	978-0007306206

== Charity Work ==
Swale-Pope is a patron of PHASE Worldwide, which works to improve education, healthcare and livelihoods in remote areas of Nepal.

== See also ==
- List of pedestrian circumnavigators
