= Principality (disambiguation) =

A principality is a monarchical feudatory or sovereign state, ruled or reigned over by a monarch with the title of prince or princess.

Principality may also refer to:

- Principality (angel), an order in the Christian angelic hierarchy
- Principality Building Society, a financial services provider based in Cardiff, Wales
- Millennium Stadium, Cardiff, Wales, sometimes referred to as the Principality
