= Cardiff Half Marathon =

Annual half marathon in Cardiff, Wales

- Date: October
- Location: Cardiff, Wales
- Event type: Road
- Distance: Half Marathon
- Established: 2003
- Course records: Men's: 59:23 (2025) (Ethiopia) Yismaw Dillu; Women's: 1:05:40 (2026) (Kenya) Joyciline Jepkosgei
- Website: Official website
- Participants: 24,038 (2026)

The Cardiff Half Marathon (Welsh: Hanner Marathon Caerdydd) is an annual half marathon race held in the Welsh capital city of Cardiff, normally taking place on the first Sunday in October.

The event was established in 2003, initially alongside the Cardiff Marathon, however, due to the increasing popularity of the Half Marathon, the Marathon distance was dropped after 2006. The race was originally organised by the children’s charity Barnardo’s. Now organised by Run 4 Wales, the race has grown to accommodate up to 27,500 runners.

The 2026 event had no headline sponsor and was styled simply as the 2026 Cardiff Half Marathon. International sport and leisure brand Oysho were the headline sponsor for the 2025 event, and previous partners include Principality Building Society (2023-2024), Wizz Air (2022), Cardiff University (2016-2022) and Lloyds Bank (2007-2015).

The course has always been predominantly flat, making it ideal for first time runners and professionals alike (elite runners can gain free entry to the race).

The event has incorporated the prestigious World (2016) Commonwealth (2018) British (2014/2015) and Welsh (Annually) Half Marathon Championships and has held a World Athletics Elite Road Race Label since 2017. The route includes some of Cardiff's most iconic landmarks, including the Cardiff Castle, Cardiff Bay Barrage, Pierhead Building and Roath Park Lake.

The race is a part of SuperHalfs, a series of leading international half marathon races including Lisbon, Prague, Berlin, Valencia and Copenhagen. Races have been chosen based on their quality, popularity, location and commitments to sustainability. All hold World Athletics (IAAF) labels whilst Copenhagen, Cardiff and Valencia have all recently hosted the IAAF World Half Marathon Championships.

The event has grown considerably over the years and now attracts both UK and international runners – it is now known as one of the top events in the British running calendar. Having previously sold out regularly, the event now operates a ballot entry system and attracts around 30,000 entrants

Previous participants in Cardiff races include Paralympic champion Dame Tanni Grey-Thompson, GB's most decorated track Olympian Mo Farah, inspirational adventurer Sir Ranulph Fiennes and BBC Radio 1 DJ Scott Mills.

The 2012 Cardiff Half Marathon appeared in the March 2013 episode of Casualty "Brave New World" as the Holby Half Marathon which Big Mac was taking part in.

== Event Organiser ==
The event is organised by Run 4 Wales (R4W), a not-for-profit social enterprise and charitable trust set-up to promote, manage and deliver major sporting events including the 2016 World Half Marathon Championships (Cardiff), 2015 World Mountain Running Championships (North Wales) and 2018 Commonwealth Half Marathon Championships (Cardiff).

Established in 2012, Run 4 Wales is a UK mass participation event organiser. Its event portfolio includes/has included: Oysho Cardiff Half Marathon, Velothon Wales, ABP Newport Marathon Festival, Brecon Carreg Cardiff Bay 10K, Brecon Carreg Porthcawl 10K, Barry Island 10K, Dell Technologies Management Challenge and Brecon Carreg CDF 10K. Run 4 Wales is also the owner of Always Aim High Events.

== The 2026 Race ==
The 23rd edition of the Cardiff Half Marathon took place on Sunday 4th October 2026. A new course record of 1:05:40 was set in the women's race by Joyciline Jepkosgei, beating Edith Chelimo's 2017 record by 12 seconds. Gideon Kiprotich won' the men's race in 59:34 holding last year's winner Yismaw Dillu to second place, though Dillu's 2025 course record remained intact.

General entry to the 2026 race was via a ballot for the first time and the official results list 24,038 finishers.

== The 2025 Race ==
The 2025 Cardiff Half Marathon took place on Sunday 5 October 2025 and was sponsored by Oysho for the first time. The male winner of the race was Yismaw Dillu with a time of 59:23. The female winner was Miriam Chebet in a time of 1:06:36.

== The 2024 Race ==
The 2024 event was the biggest in the event's 21 year history, with 29,000 participants registered across Saturday's junior races (1500 participants) and Sunday's half marathon (27,500 participants).

The event attracted a strong elite field with both Patrick Mosin and Miriam Chebet completing a Kenyan clean-sweep in the Men and Women’s races. The 24-year-old Mosin surged away from 2023 champion Vincent Mutai to take his title before his compatriot Chebet smashed her personal best to claim first place. It was a family affair in the elite wheelchair race as husband and wife Callum and Jade Hall battled it out across the streets of Cardiff. It was Callum, of County Durham, who eventually came out on top in 55:05, but Jade claimed the Women’s title in 57:57.

The theme for the event was ‘A Race For Everyone’ and was an opportunity to celebrate the diversity of the city. The 100 Club campaign offered free spaces in the race to the community with groups including Oasis Cardiff, Newport Live, Cardiff Muslim Runners, the Mwslima Running Club and Slimming World. A Principality Rainbow Roundabout, a collaboration between Principality Building Society and Pride Cymru, also added a boost to runners in between miles 10 and 12.

== The 2023 Race ==
The 2023 race saw the event celebrate its 20th anniversary and was the first year that the Principality Building Society was the headline sponsor.

Vincent Mutai and Mestawut Fikir clinched Principality Cardiff Half Marathon glory. Mutai overcame course record holder and countryman Shadrack Kimining in humid conditions to take the title in 01:00:35 after a sprint finish down King Edward VII Avenue. The 28-year-old was part of a lead group alongside Kimining, Bernard Biwott and last year’s champion Geoffrey Koech who powered through the city to register a time of 28 minutes and 29 seconds after the first 10K.

Last year’s victor was cut loose by his fellow Kenyans as they raced through Cathays and around Roath Park to setup a sprint finish in the heart of the capital. Mutai rounded the corner into the final straight and left Kimining (01:00:47) in his wake to secure a maiden Cardiff victory. Biwott rallied in the final stages to push the former champ close, but he had to settle for third as he finished three seconds back.

A single second split the top three in the women’s event as Ethiopia’s Mestawut Fikir came out on top after a sprint finish to clinch the gold medal.

It was her second victory in two months as she added the Cardiff Half to her win at the Antrim Coast Half Marathon, but she had to fight until the last metre to overcome compatriot Aminet Ahmed and last year’s runner-up Viola Chepngeno.

Beatrice Cheserek, who beat Chepngeno to the title last time out led from the front in defence of her title but faded to allow the trio through to battle it out down the home straight.

In the wheelchair race, Josh Hartley of Coventry Godiva Harriers led from the off and never looked back as he won the race a full 10 minutes ahead of nearest challenger Tiaan Bosch (1:03:27). Hartley’s club mate Gary Cooper was a further 35 seconds back as he took bronze. Martyna Snopek won the female race.

A number of exciting campaigns took place alongside the special 20th anniversary race in conjunction with Principality Building Society, including the #HealthyHabits initiative, the addition of a new Principality Rainbow Roundabout in partnership with Pride Cymru and a £24,207 house deposit giveaway competition.

== The 2022 Races ==
The race could not go ahead in 2020 or 2021 because of the COVID-19 pandemic. The first ever Virtual Cardiff Half Marathon was hosted in October 2020 and again in October 2021, with thousands of people taking on the 13.1 mile distance from locations around the world. In 2022, the rescheduled '2020' event took place on Sunday 27 March (the 18th edition) and was the last race sponsored by Cardiff University.

Natasha Cockram produced the run of her career over 13.1 miles to clinch the title on home soil. The reigning British Marathon champion slashed two minutes off her previous personal best to become the first Welsh woman to win the event since Helen Yule 18 years ago in 1:10:47. Refugee team runner Kadar Omar took the men's title in 62:46.

The October 2022 race was sponsored by Wizz Air and saw the event raise its 20 millionth pound in charity fundraising. It was a double win for Kenya with race favourite Geoffrey Koech storming ahead to win the men’s elite race, finishing just one second outside of the hour mark (1:00:01). Kenya's Beatrice Cheserek won on her event debut in 1:06:48 ahead of compatriot Viola Chepngeno and Zewditu Aderaw of Ethiopia.

== The 2019 Race ==
In 2019, Kenya's Leonard Langat broke the course record, winning in 59:30. Langat came up with a brilliant sprint finish to pip fellow Kenyan, and 2016 champion, Shadrack Kimming by a mere two seconds. In the women's race, Kenya's Lucy Cheruiyot and Ethiopia’s Azmera Abreha ran side-by-side down the finishing straight, with another Kenyan, Paskalia Kipkoech, not far behind. In the end, the extra strength of Cheruiyot carried her to victory, although both she and Abreha were given the same times, 68:20. Kipkoech was a further five seconds behind in 68:25.

The race sold out in record time and celebrated its first ever female majority and the rise of women's running with the #WhyWeRun campaign.

== The 2018 Race ==
In 2018, the Cardiff Half Marathon incorporated the first Commonwealth Half Marathon Championships, with athletes from all over the Commonwealth coming to run in Wales. The race saw athletes from Kenya, Uganda, Wales, England, Scotland, Northern Ireland, Australia, New Zealand, Botswana, Sierra Leone, Mauritius and many more countries compete.

It was Australia's Jack Rayner who ran the race of his life to take Commonwealth glory with a new personal best of 61:01. Uganda's Juliet Chekwel was victorious in the women's race, finishing in 69:45.

Rayner's efforts in the men's event was not enough to win Australia a team victory as they settled for second best, finishing just behind Uganda. Uganda also managed no.1 in the team event in the women's race, with Australia once again coming second. Team England managed 3rd in both races. The event also gave Dewi Griffiths the chance to pull on his Welsh vest once more after enduring a tough year through injury, and he came home in 62:56.

The 2018 race kept the IAAF Silver Label Road status and sold out in just over 6 months, making it the most popular race in the event's history.

== The 2017 Race ==
As the race grew in popularity, both novice and seasoned runners were wanting to get involved in the action. 2017 was the first year where the race completely sold out, selling 25,000 entries before the race. This was the first time it had happened in the race's fourteen-year history.

The 2017 edition was awarded IAAF Silver Label Road status for the first time.

2017 was another year for course records, with Kenya's John Lotiang running 60:42 in the men's field, and Edith Chelimo crossing the line in just 65:50. These records still stand.

== The 2016 Race ==
In March 2016, the IAAF World Half Marathon Championships took place in Cardiff on the same course than the Cardiff Half Marathon. Following a successful sponsorship of the 2016 IAAF World Half Marathon Championships, Cardiff University was confirmed as the race's title sponsor, changing its name to Cardiff University/Cardiff Half Marathon.

The 2016 edition received IAAF Bronze Label Road status and nearly 22,000 runners took part in the race confirming Cardiff’s place as the UK’s second-biggest half marathon and the third-largest road race behind the Great North Run and the London Marathon.

The event saw Kenyans Shadrack Korir and Violah Jepchumba set course records in the men's and women's elite races.

== The 2015 race ==
More than 22,000 runners took part in this 2015 Cardiff Half Marathon. Ugandan Ben Siwa won the men's race, breaking a 5-year run of victories for Kenyan athletes, while Lenah Jerotich from Kenya won the women's title. Around 2.4m was raised for over 800 charities.

== The 2014 race ==
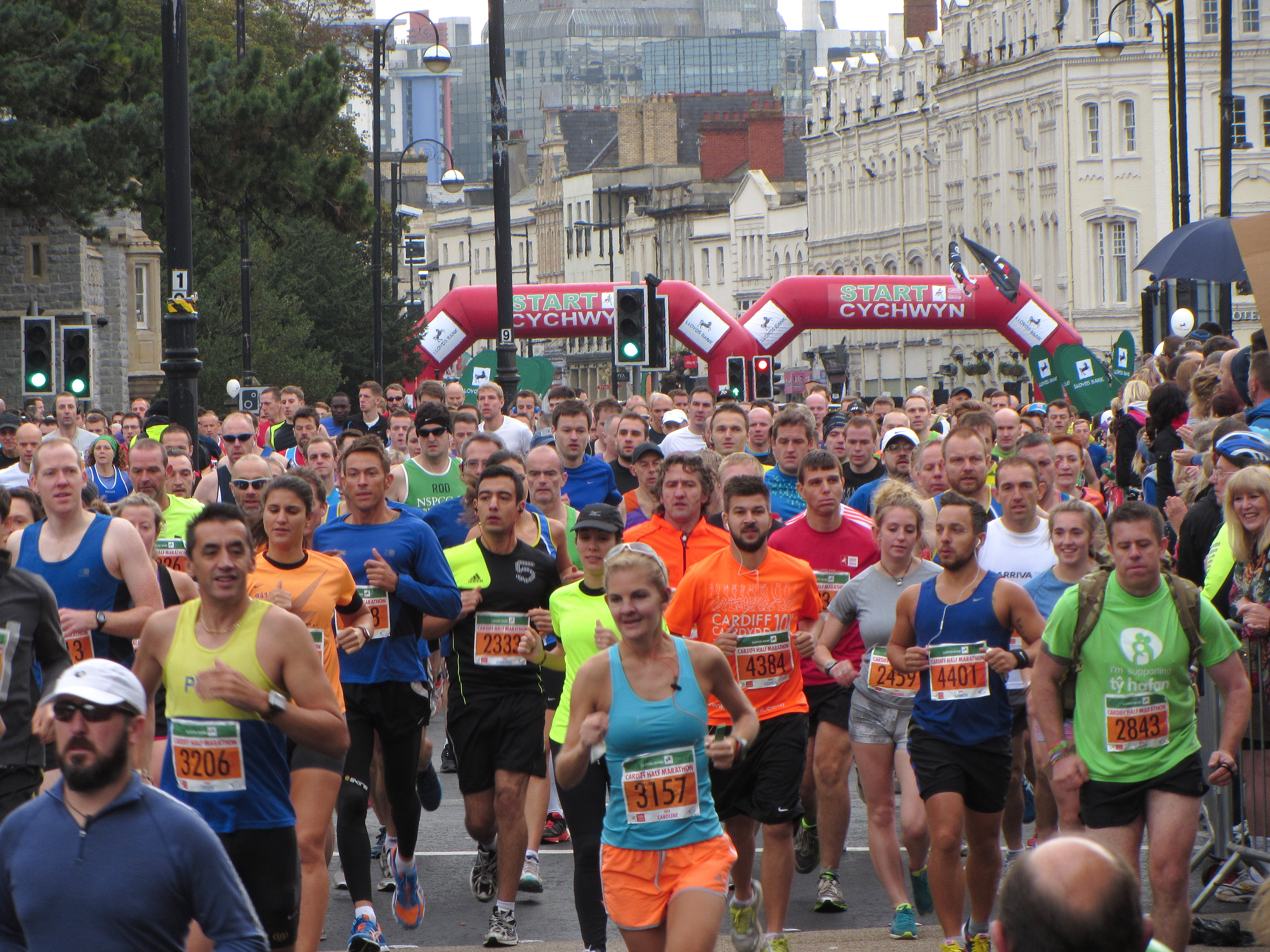
View at the start of the 2014 Cardiff Half Marathon next to the Angel Hotel

The 2014 saw numbers increase further, with the race breaking 20,000 registrations for the first time in its history. With more numbers, the crowds came out in their droves to support their friends and family, with Welsh athlete Ieuan Thomas noting the 'electric' atmosphere generating in Cardiff. Defending champion Loitarakwai Lengurisi lost his title to Boniface Kongin in 2014, with Joan Chelimo clocking 72:25 as she raced over the finish line as first placed female.

== The 2013 race ==
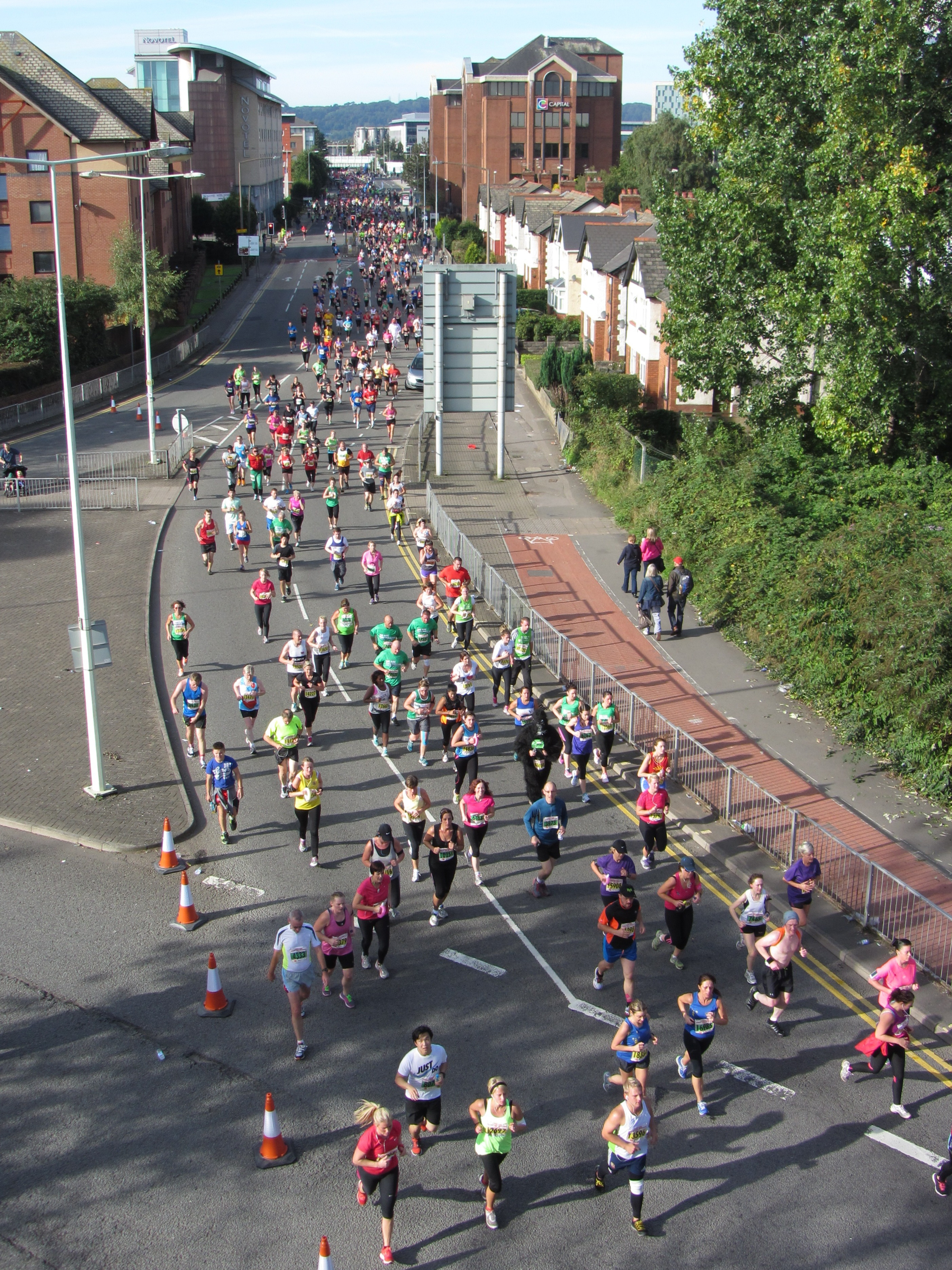
View westward along Tyndall Street

In 2013, numbers grew once more with over 14,000 runners taking on 13.1 miles. As competition grew fiercer, more records were broken as Loitarakwai Lengurisi and Purity Kimetto taking first position in the men's and women's elite race.

== The 2012 race ==
The 2012 race was the first edition organised by Run 4 Wales, with Andrew Lesuuda and Sue Partridge taking victories in the elite field. Sue Partridge clocked a 71:10 personal best, holding off stiff competition from Kenyan athletes in her footsteps. Dewi Griffiths, who would later go on to become a Cardiff Half Marathon star, won the men's Welsh Championships, with Caryl Jones taking the women's title.

== The 2011 race ==
The 2011 Lloyds TSB Cardiff Half Marathon was a sell-out with a record number of runners taking part.

Kenyan Edwin Kiptoo won the 2011 Lloyds TSB Cardiff Half Marathon and claimed a course record, running 13.1 miles in 1 hour 3 minutes and 27 seconds. Kenyans dominated the top three, with Andrew Lesuuda and Edwin Kipkorir, last year’s winner, taking 2nd and 3rd. The women’s race was won by Kenyan Alice Mogire, with a time of 1:11:26. Second and third place were taken by Poland’s Agnieszka Ciolek and Kenyan Edinah Kwambai. The race attracted runners from all corners of the globe, including the US, Poland and Australia.

Winning the Welsh Half Marathon Championships were Swansea Harriers’ Philip Matthews and Andrea Whitcombe.

Olympic silver medal winner and event patron Jamie Baulch started the race along with the Lord Mayor of Cardiff.

Thousands of runners raised money for almost 800 different charities and good causes. An estimated £1,000,000 was raised, with a team of 1200 people running for Barnardo’s, the race’s charity partner.

== The 2010 race ==
Every year the race attracts runners from all over the UK and further afield. It is fast becoming known as one of the top events in the autumn running calendar. The 2010 race attracted runners from all corners of the globe, including many from Europe, the US and Kenya.

Before the 2009 race took place, the event organisers announced the date of the 2010 Cardiff Half Marathon to be Sunday 17 October. Registrations opened immediately after the 2009 event. The Welsh Government were backing the race with a £75,000 grant, with the aim to get 20,000 runners competing in the race by 2012. Wales' First minister Rhodri Morgan was so impressed with the 2009 event that he told the BBC he would do the race in 2010.

The size of the field has dramatically expanded during the race’s history; from just under 1,500 runners in 2003 to 25,000 registrants in 2018. The race has grown to become the second biggest half marathon in the UK. The number of runners has grown year on year.

The Cardiff Half Marathon is now host to the Welsh Half Marathon Championships, recognising Wales’s best athletes. 2010’s winners were Cardiff AAC’s Michael Johnson and Neath’s Anne-Marie Hutchison. The race is also attracting elite runners from abroad. The 2010 race saw two foreign winners for the first time, with Edwin Kipkorir and Hellen Jemutai claiming first prize.

2010’s race also saw the debut of the Cardiff Family Fun Run. This special one mile (1.6 km) run allowed children and their families to enjoy running part of the course during the main race and gave the race a carnival atmosphere.

== The 2009 race ==
The 2009 Cardiff Half Marathon took place on Sunday 18 October 2009 and was started by sprinter Jamie Baulch. Just over 11,000 runners signed up to participate in the race, with an estimated 18,000 spectators also coming to Cardiff to offer support.

The new and improved route took runners past famous city landmarks such as the Castle and the Wales Millennium Centre and included a run along the barrage and wetlands. It started on King Edward VII Avenue in Cathays Park near Cardiff City Hall, the race looped around towards Cardiff Castle. Runners were taken down St. Mary Street, before weaving their way back towards the Wales Millennium Centre. From there it was down towards the barrage, where competitors ran to Tracy Island. From the barrage switchback runners headed towards the Norwegian Church, Cardiff The Senedd and the beautiful Cardiff Bay area. Next it was the wetlands and Taff Embankment, before returning to the streets. Thereafter it was on to Llandaff Fields and Bute Park, before returning to the Castle for the final stretch to the finish line on King Edward VII Avenue.

The men's race was won by Simon Lawson of Lisvane, Cardiff. He broke his own record of being the fastest UK junior half marathon runner with a time of 1:05:48. In second place was Michael Johnson, while Simon Jones, who won the 2007 and 2008 races, finished third.

Many participating runners were raising money for charity. Event organisers Barnardo's suggested that almost £1 million was raised by runners for a range of good causes.

Highlights of the race were also broadcast on TV for the first time. S4C showed the programme the day after the event, while Channel 4 were covering it on Sunday 8 November 2009 at 7:55 am.

== Recent winners ==
Key: Current course record

Table of recent winners.

=== Half Marathon (2003–present) ===
| Year | Date | Men's winner | Time (h:m:s) | Women's winner | Time (h:m:s) |
|---|---|---|---|---|---|
| 2026 | 4 October | Gideon Kiprotich (KEN) | 59:34 | Joyciline Jepkosgei (KEN) | 1:05:40 |
| 2025 | 5 October | Yismaw Dillu (ETH) | 59:23 | Miriam Chebet (KEN) | 1:06:36 |
| 2024 | 6 October | Patrick Mosin (KEN) | 1:00:02 | Miriam Chebet (KEN) | 1:06:43 |
| 2023 | 1 October | Vincent Mutai (KEN) | 1:00:35 | Mestawut Fikir (ETH) | 1:08:13 |
| 2022 (Autumn) | 2 October | Geoffrey Koech (KEN) | 1:00:01 | Beatrice Cheserek (KEN) | 1:06:48 |
| 2022 (Spring) | 27 March | Kadar Omar (Refugee) | 1:02:46 | Natasha Cockram (GBR) | 1:10:47 |
| 2019 | 6 October | Leonard Langat (KEN) | 59:30 | Lucy Cheruiyot (KEN) | 1:08:20 |
| 2018 | 7 October | Jack Rayner (AUS) | 1:01:01 | Juliet Chekwel (UGA) | 1:09:45 |
| 2017 | 1 October | John Lotiang (KEN) | 1:00:42 | Edith Chelimo (KEN) | 1:05:52 |
| 2016 | 2 October | Shadrack Korir (KEN) | 1:00:53 | Violah Jepchumba (KEN) | 1:08:13 |
| 2015 | 4 October | Ben Siwa (UGA) | 1:02:06 | Lenah Jerotich (KEN) | 1:11:29 |
| 2014 | 5 October | Boniface Kongin (KEN) | 1:02:02 | Joan Chelimo (KEN) | 1:12:25 |
| 2013 | 7 October | Loitarakwai Olengurisi (KEN) | 1:01:51 | Purity Kimetto (KEN) | 1:14:21 |
| 2012 | 14 October | Andrew Lesuuda (KEN) | 1:02:21 | Susan Partridge (GBR) | 1:11:10 |
| 2011 | 16 October | Edwin Kiptoo (KEN) | 1:03:26 | Alice Mogire (KEN) | 1:11:26 |
| 2010 | 17 October | Edwin Kipkorir (KEN) | 1:02:07 | Hellen Jemutai (KEN) | 1:10:49 |
| 2009 | 18 October | Simon Lawson (GBR) | 1:05:50 | Genet Measso (ETH) | 1:15:01 |
| 2008 | 19 October | Simon Jones (GBR) | 1:07:48 | Alice Braham (GBR) | 1:16:41 |
| 2007 | 14 October | Simon Jones (GBR) | 1:07:57 | Rebecca Harrison (GBR) | 1:18:38 |
| 2006 | 15 October | Simon Jones (GBR) | 1:07:15 | Rebecca Harrison (GBR) | 1:18:33 |
| 2005 | 9 October | Phill Sly (AUS) | 1:08:38 | Kelly Vennus (GBR) | 1:23:07 |
| 2004 | 3 October | Adrian Marriott (GBR) | 1:08:28 | Helen Yule (GBR) | 1:27:46 |
| 2003 | 28 September | Adrian Marriott (GBR) | 1:09:27 | Claire Peock (GBR) | 1:27:24 |
