= Aberavon Mutual Permanent Building Society =

- Company type: Building society
- Industry: Financial services
- Defunct: January 1974
- Fate: Acquired by the Principality Building Society
- Successor: Principality Building Society
- Headquarters: Aberavon, United Kingdom

Aberavon Mutual Permanent Building Society was a building society in the United Kingdom. It is mentioned in the deeds to several properties at the West Glamorgan Archive Service. In January 1974 the society was acquired by the Principality Building Society.
