= Cardiff Marathon =

Former annual running event in Wales

There have been three incarnations of the Cardiff Marathon, which was an annual marathon race held on various years in Cardiff between 1981 and 2006.

== 1981 - 1986 ==
The first race was held on 20 September 1981, with over 4000 competitors, and among the competitors was Justin Chaston, who was later an Olympic athlete. The event was called the Western Mail Marathon from 1981 to 1986, and started and finished at the Civic Centre. The first winner was Bernie Plain. (In 1981 there was no minimum age restriction of 18, so a few of the runners were younger - including Mark Murray (12), Michael Nesbitt (12), Justin Chaston, Allyn Carter (12) and Malcolm Rich (16) who finished 184). For the first three editions, the course was a loop to Barry. For the next three editions, it was a double loop.

== 1990 - 1992 ==
From 1987 to 1989 it was not held. From 1990 to 1992, the race started and finished at the Eastern Leisure Centre in Llanrumney.

== 2002 - 2006 ==
From 1993 to 2001 it was again not held. It returned in 2002 and then in 2003 the Cardiff Half Marathon option was added. From 2003 to 2006, the marathon and half marathon were held together. The marathon consisted of two laps of the half marathon course and the finish was at the Millennium Stadium, and from 2004 was inside the stadium. However, as the Half Marathon became so popular, from 2007 it replaced the full marathon altogether.

=== Recent Results ===
Year	Date	Men's winner	Time (h:m:s)	Women's winner	Time (h:m:s)
2006	15 October	Mark Roberts (GBR)	2:29:39	Michelle Awuye (GBR)	2:58:41
2005	9 October	Neo Molema (RSA)	2:29:14	Vicki Perry (GBR)	2:56:51
2004	3 October	Julian Baker	2:28:33	Ruth Pickvance	2:53:47
2003	28 September	Richard Gardiner	2:24:32	Ruth Pickvance	2:51:34

== Proposed Return 2017 / 2018 ==
During the Cardiff Half Marathon weekend in 2016, the organizers, Run4Wales, announced plans for a full Marathon to be held in April 2017 ahead of the London Marathon. However, a couple of weeks later it was announced that plans has suffered a setback, as they were still exploring route options and did not want to rush things. So the race would not take place until 2018. The plan was later ended and in October 2017, Run4Wales instead announced plans for a full marathon to be held in April 2018 in the neighboring city of Newport. See Newport Marathon.
