= Miriam Chebet =

Kenyan long-distance runner (born 2002)

Personal information
- Nationality: Kenyan
- Born: 18 February 2002 (age 24)

Sport
- Sport: Athletics
- Events: Long-distance running, Cross country running

Achievements and titles
- Personal bests: 5000m: 15:56.27 (2022); 10,000m: 30:27.30 (2024); Road; 5k: 15:21 (2024); 10k: 30:08 (2026); Half marathon: 1:05:39 (2026)

Miriam Chebet (born 18 September 2002) is a Kenyan long-distance and cross country runner.

== Biography ==
Chebet ran 34:09 to place third at the Sirikwa Cross Country Classic in Eldoret on 22 February 2025. Chebet ran a lifetime best of 1:06:07 to win the Istanbul Half Marathon in April 2025. Later in 2025, Chebet won the Cardiff Half Marathon with a time of 1:06:36, defending the title she had previously won in 2024 in a then personal best of 1:06.42. Chebet placed fifth over 10,000 metres at the Kenyan World Championships Trials in Nairobi.

In January 2026, Chebet ran a 30:08 personal best over 10km in Valencia, Spain. She had a record-breaking time at the Yangzhou Half Marathon, a World Athletics Platinum Label road race, on 29 March 2026, winning in 1:06:27, braking the course record by 38 seconds.

Chebet was selected as part of the Kenyan team for the 2026 Commonwealth Games in Glasgow, Scotland. On 25 October, she had a top-ten finish at the Valencia half marathon, her time of 1:05:39 a new personal best.
