= Andrew Lesuuda =

Kenyan long-distance runner

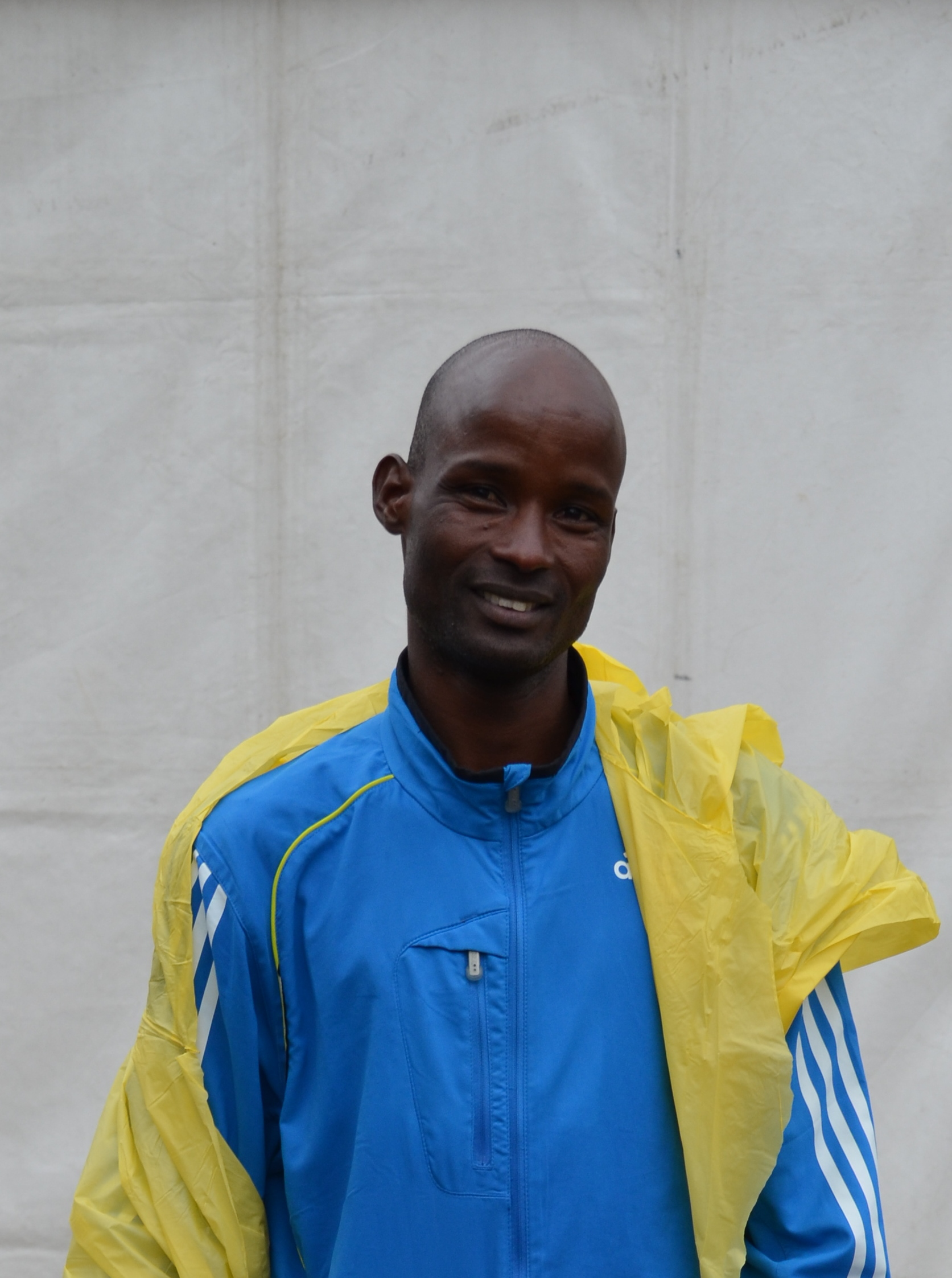
Andrew Lesuuda (October 2011)

Andrew Lesuuda Papassio (b. 1981-04-15) is a male long-distance runner from Kenya.

== Achievements ==
Year	Competition	Venue	Position	Event	Notes
2011	Stroud Half Marathon	Stroud	1st	Half marathon	1:03:56
2012	Nottingham Half Marathon	Nottingham, United Kingdom	2nd	Half marathon	1:02:22
2012	Cardiff Half Marathon	Cardiff, United Kingdom	1st	Half marathon	1:02:21
2012	Basingstoke Half Marathon	Hampshire, United Kingdom	1st	Half marathon	1:04:09
2013	Reading Half Marathon	Reading, United Kingdom	1st	Half marathon	1:04:15
2014	Bournemouth Marathon	Bournemouth, United Kingdom	1st	Marathon	2:21:44
2014	Brighton Marathon	Brighton	8th	Marathon	2:23:56
