= Los Lingues =

Ranch located south of Santiago

Hacienda Los Lingues, in English Los Lingues Ranch, is located in Chile’s Central Valley 78 miles south of Santiago. Currently dedicated to the hotel business.

Family member Germán Claro Lyon is the general manager.

The hacienda operates a horse breeding farm with horses of the Aculeo breed. Their horses were used by Rosie Swales in 1984, when she rode the entire length of Chile as described in her book “Back to Cape Horn.” (The book provides additional history of the Hacienda.) Visitors can ride similar horses at the Hacienda, with a guide. The Hacienda is open for day visitors, group events, and overnight guests.

== History ==
The origins of the Hacienda date back to the end of the 16th century. At that time he settled in the Valley of Santiago, Don Melchor Jufré del Águila, Hidalgo Extremadura, son of a knight of the Military Order of Santiago, who served as Mayor of the capital in 1599. As a writer and chronicler, It gained prestige in the Santiago society and was graced by the King of Spain with the Estancia de la Angostura, located in the Central Valley. Hacienda Los Lingues is inherited later by his daughter Doña Ana María del Águila, wife of the Governor of Chile, Don Diego González Montero (1662-1670). Both are ancestors of the Don José Gregorio Argomedo and Montero del Águila, who was born there in 1767.

== Links ==
Official webcite
