= Principality Building Society =

Financial services provider

Principality Building Society Cymdeithas Adeiladu Principality
- Company type: Building society (mutual)
- Industry: Banking and financial services
- Founded: 1860; 166 years ago
- Headquarters: Cardiff, Wales, UK
- Number of locations: 71
- Key people: Sally Jones-Evans (chair); Julie-Ann Haines (chief executive)
- Products: Savings, Mortgages, Investments
- Revenue: ▲£174.6 million (2022)
- Operating income: ▲£61.5 million (2022)
- Net income: ▲£50.8 million (2022)
- Total assets: ▲£11,257 million (2022)
- Total equity: ▲£678.8 million (2022)
- Number of employees: 1,157 (2022); 1,104 (2021)
- Website: Official website

Principality Building Society (Welsh: Cymdeithas Adeiladu Principality) is a building society based in Cardiff, Wales. At December 2022, the Society had total assets of more than £11 billion.

Principality Building Society is a mutual, which means it is owned by its members rather than shareholders. It serves clients through the internet and telephone as well as at high street branches. It is a member of the Building Societies Association.

== History ==
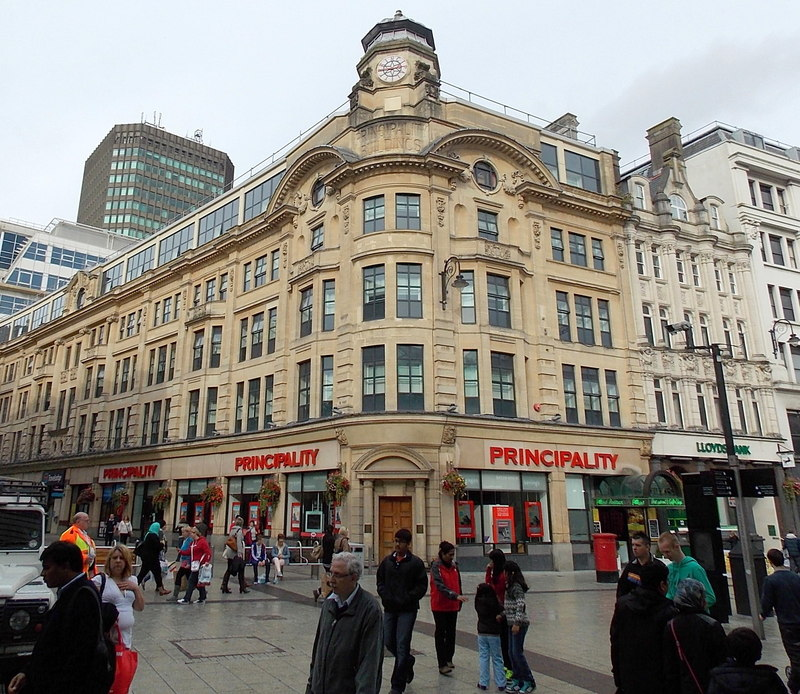
Principality Buildings (opened in 1914) on Queen Street, Cardiff. Formerly the headquarters of the Principality Building Society (picture taken c. 2013)

=== 1860-1960 ===
The society was formed in Cardiff under the lengthy name of the Principality Permanent Benefit Building and Investment Society in 1860. The “Benefit” was dropped in 1876 when it incorporated under the Building Societies Act 1874, and to its present name in 1913. The trustees were local dignitaries and the directors largely tradesmen and merchants. It did not have its first office until 1870 and although it had an early agency, it remained a small local society. Despite this, the Principality was able to claim to be “the largest by far in Wales and the West of England” when it gave evidence to a House of Commons Committee in 1893. By 1910, the Society had some 6,000 accounts and was large enough to have its own office in 1914. It was not until the 1930s that the society appeared to make any significant move away from Cardiff, when branches were opened in Swansea and Barry in 1934. Given the boom in private housing and the subsequent impact of inflation, the society’s asset growth remained modest – from £2m in 1932 to £3m in 1947. Expansion from the 1930s appeared to come mainly from agencies and by 1960 these totalled around 50.

=== Post 1960 ===
From 1960 the pace of expansion appeared to increase. Important branch openings were Chester in 1960 and London in 1963. The Principality also began to acquire smaller Welsh societies, three between 1959 and 1968. During that decade assets grew from £9m to £34m. In the 1970s there were a further five acquisitions but a much greater emphasis on organic expansion through new branches – over 20 in the decade. Branch openings continued through the 1980s and in 1991 assets reached £1billion. By then, the branch network was established and although there was the occasional new opening, the asset growth came from its existing structure, with private mortgage lending supplemented by the formation of a commercial lending division in 2002. Today, those assets stand at £11bn.

=== Diversification ===
Principality acquired Parkhurst and Peter Alan estate agents in 1987, and the merged entity was later sold to Connells Group for £16.4m in 2014. A site for a new head office to accommodate the expanding business was acquired in 1989 and Principality House in The Friary was opened in 1992.

In 2003, the sales and marketing director at the time, Bill Mayne considered rebranding the image and name of the building society, in an interview he said; "We are looking to update the look and feel of our brand communications and branch environments to reflect what our brand is about.", he continued by saying; "Everything is up for grabs, but it would be quite irresponsible just to ditch Principality because the name is politically incorrect. But we will be looking at Welshness and what Welshness means in the modern age."

In 2013 the company acquired Mead Property Services (covering Buckinghamshire, Berkshire and Oxfordshire) and Thomas George (covering Cardiff and south Wales).

On 8 September 2015, Principality Building Society announced that they had purchased the naming rights to the Millennium Stadium in a 10-year deal. Since 1 January 2016 it has been known as the Principality Stadium. In 2023 and 2024, it was the headline sponsor of the Principality Cardiff Half Marathon.

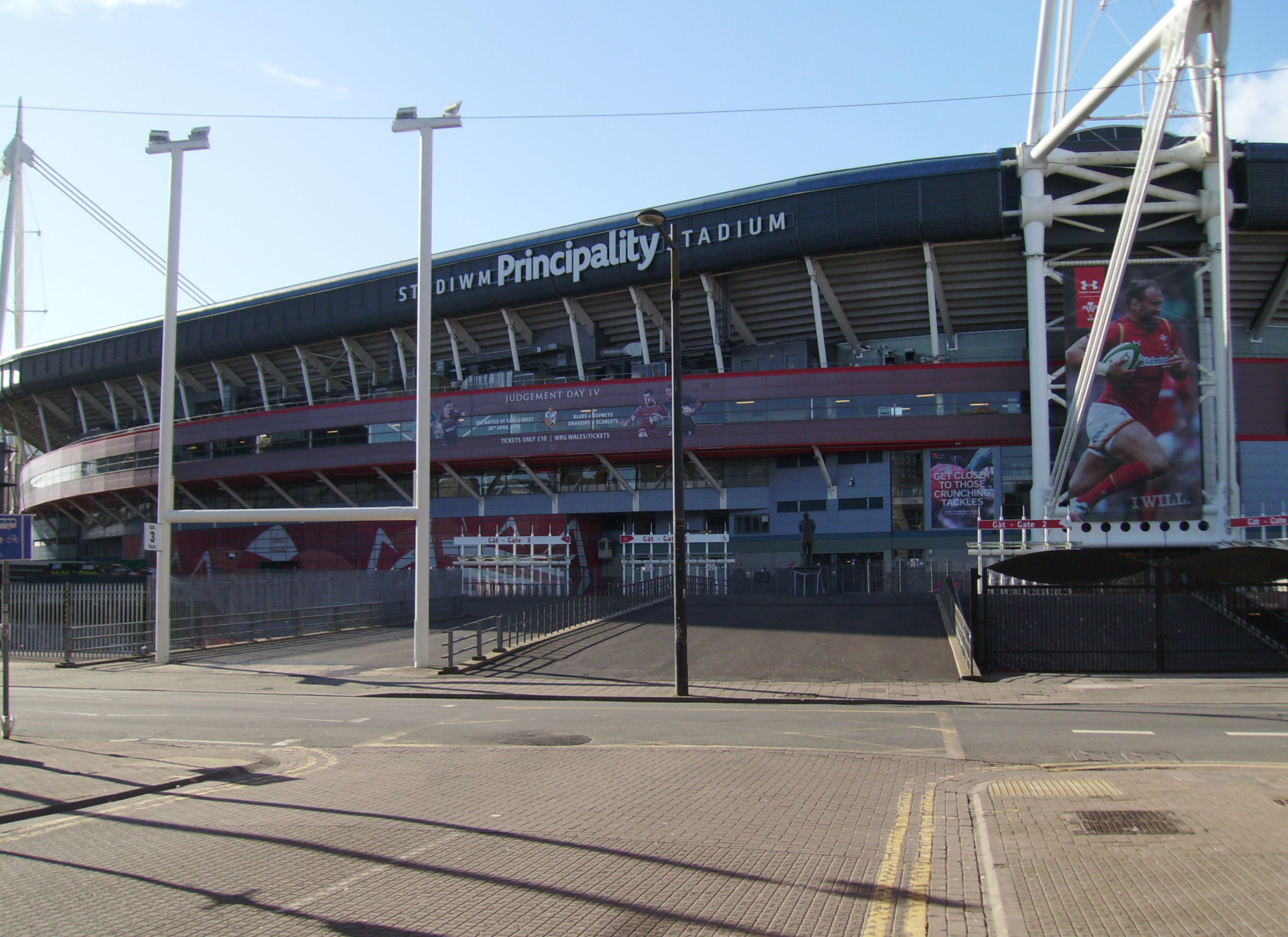
Principality Stadium, earlier known as the Millennium Stadium in Cardiff

== Mergers and acquisitions ==
The following building societies merged into the Principality Building Society:

- Bridgend Building Society in 1959
- Urban Building Society in 1962
- Maesteg Permanent Benefit Society in 1968
- Aberavon Mutual Permanent Building Society in 1974
- Swansea & Carmarthen Building Society in 1974
- Llanelli Permanent Building Society in 1977
- District Building Society in 1978
- Gorseinon Building Society in 1979
- Chatham Building Society in 1985
The Principality branch network

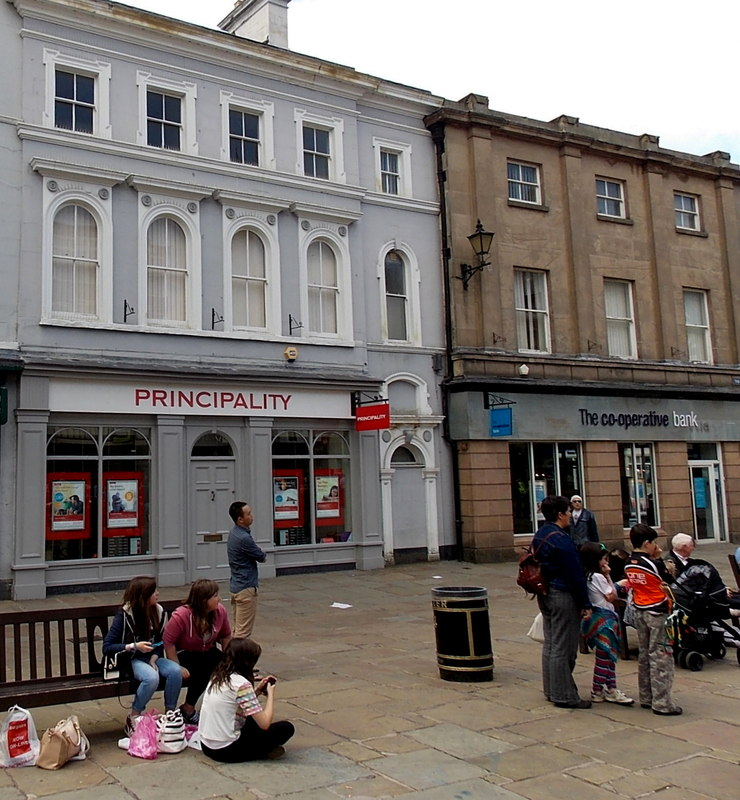
Shrewsbury branch

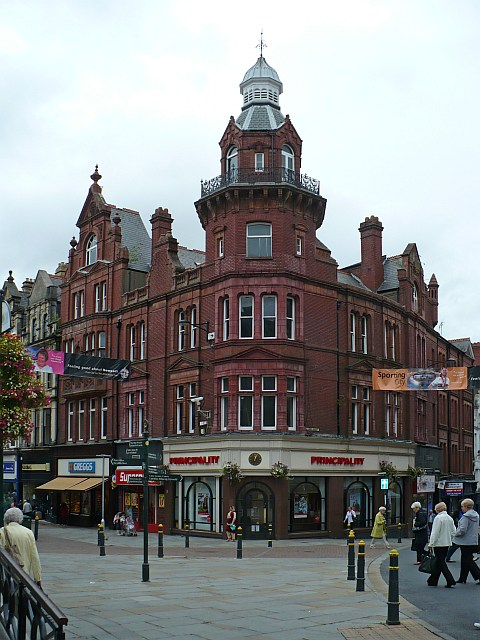
Newport branch

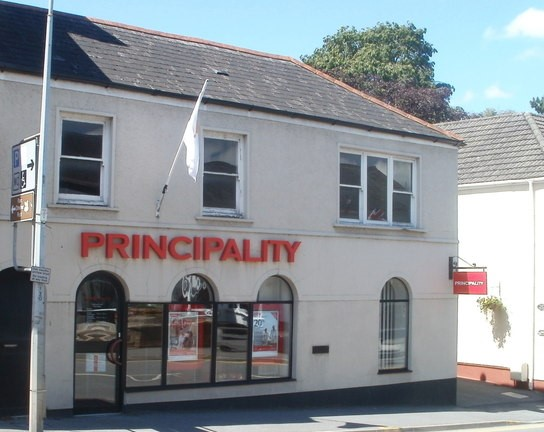
Llandeilo branch
