= Newport Marathon =

Road running event in Newport, Wales

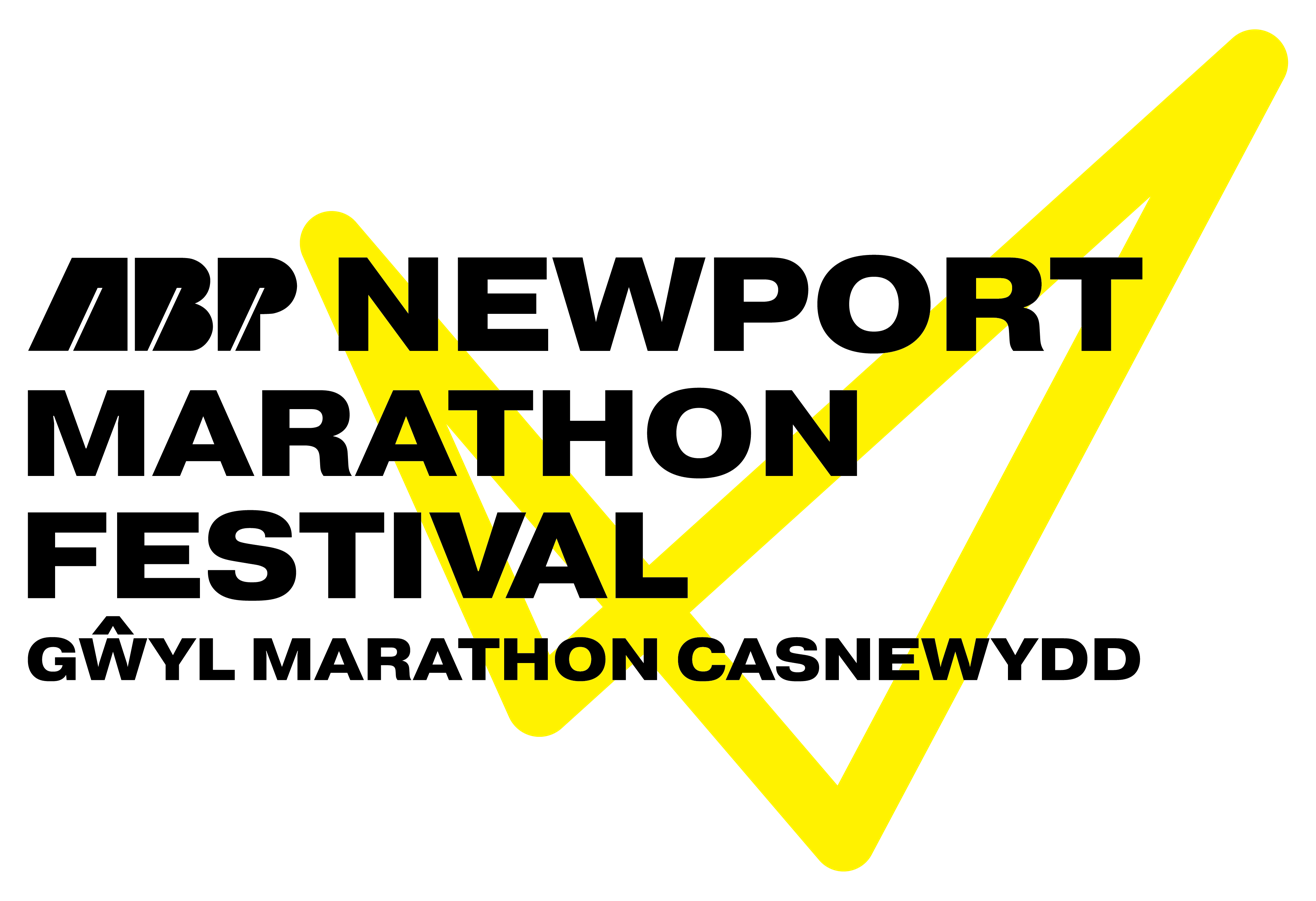
- Date: April
- Location: Newport, Wales
- Event type: Road
- Distance: Marathon Half Marathon 10K, Junior Race
- Primary sponsor: Associated British Ports
- Established: 2018
- Course records: Marathon Men: 2:19:46 (Dan Nash, 2023) Women: 02:38:31 (Melissah Gibson, 2025) Half Marathon Men: 01:07:15 (Ronnie Richmond, 2024) Women: 01:11:17 (Natasha Wilson, 2026) 10K Men: 00:28:35 (Omar Ahmed, 2023) Women: 00:32:55 (Beth Kidger, 2025)
- Website: ABP Newport Marathon Festival

Newport Marathon
- City of Newport and (inset) within Wales

The ABP Newport Marathon Festival (Welsh: Gwyl Marathon Casnewydd ABP) is a festival of running offering marathon, half marathon, 10-kilometer, and mile race options in the Welsh city of Newport, Wales. The event was established in 2018 by national race organisers Run 4 Wales (R4W) and is held in April.

== Background ==
The event's title sponsor is Associated British Ports (ABP), the operator of South Wales' ports, including Newport Docks. Since its first race in 2018, participation continues to grow year on year. Originally featuring a marathon and 10K distance, the ABP Newport Marathon Festival was expanded into a full festival of running with the addition of a half marathon distance in 2024, allowing something for all ages and abilities to get involved in.

The course is known to be particularly flat and fast, boasting one of the flattest marathon courses in Europe—with nearly 70% of finishers claiming a personal best (PB) time, it has also been included in a round up of the fastest marathons in the world, as published in Runners World. It was designed by Run 4 Wales Race Director and Welsh Olympian Steve Brace.

In previous years, a Women's Running Conference, organised in conjunction with Welsh Athletics, and a pre-race Pasta Party have also been held the day before, expanding the festivities into a two-day event.

== Route ==
Devised by double Olympic marathon runner, Steve Brace, the marathon, half marathon, and 10K routes take in Newport's iconic landmarks, including the city's historic castle, Victorian Market, Transporter Bridge, modern riverfront, and International Sports Village. The marathon and half marathon distances also take in the scenery of the Gwent Levels.

The Marathon route is one of the flattest marathon courses in Europe, which makes it ideal for first time marathon runners or those looking to secure a PB time. It starts and finishes on Newport's riverfront, taking in a loop of the city centre before heading to the International Sports Village—home to the Geraint Thomas National Velodrome. The course no longer stretches as far east as Monmouthshire, as it did prior to 2024; instead, it now turns around at the medieval village of Redwick, then heads past the Newport wetlands and Goldcliff areas.

The Half Marathon was introduced to the ABP Newport Marathon Festival in 2024. The race starts alongside the marathon distance on Usk Way and also takes runners on a loop of the city centre and International Sports Village. Runners then approach the halfway point while completing a loop of the Newport wetlands area, before finishing the race back in the city centre.

The 10K race starts slightly later than the marathon and half marathon distances and also begins on Usk Way. Much like the routes of the other two distances, the 10K race takes in a city centre loop and goes to the International Sports Village, then heads back to Usk Way to the finish line.

== Organisation ==
Sponsors include Associated British Ports (ABP), Mind in Gwent, High5, Brecon Carreg, the Office for National Statistics, Newport City Council, Mon Motors, Cancer Research Wales, Monex Group, Coopah, Newport Live, and the city retail centre Friars Walk.

== Event history ==
=== 2018 event ===
==== Marathon ====
The inaugural ABP Newport Marathon took place on 29 April 2018.

The winner was Neath Harriers' James Carpenter with a time of 2:33:31. The fastest female was Natasha Cockram of Mickey Morris Racing Team with a time of 2:44:58.

The marathon saw a wide range of participants, from one of the oldest runners, 80 year old Sydney Wheeler of Chepstow Harriers, to former boxer Matthew Edmonds. A separate Family Mile also took place.

==== 10K ====
Cardiff AAC's Ieuan Thomas won the 10K with a time of 00:29:43, and Shaftesbury Barnet Harriers' Rachel Felton was the fastest female with a time of 00:35:03.

=== 2019 event ===
It was announced in May 2018 that the event would return with the 2019 marathon and 10K, which would take place for the second time on 5 May 2019. Tata Steel were announced as a new sponsor, and the Family Mile would also resume in 2019. Entry was priced at an early rate of £45, and £40 for runners affiliated with Welsh Athletics.

=== 2020 event ===
There was no marathon in 2020. Entries for that year were deferred to the following year.

=== 2024 event ===
The event rebranded to the ABP Newport Marathon Festival and a new half marathon distance was introduced. Changes to the marathon and 10K distances were also made.
