= Football at the 2006 Lusofonia Games – Men's team squads =

Teams were U-20 teams

== Group C ==
=== Portugal ===
Head coach: (Portugal) Carlos Dinis

No.	Pos.	Player	Date of birth (age)	Caps	Club
1	GK	Mário Felgueiras	12 December 1986		(Portugal) Sporting CP
2	DF	Pedro Correia	27 March 1987		(Portugal) S.L. Benfica
3	DF	Henrique Gomes	29 July 1986		(Portugal) S.L. Benfica
4	DF	Paulo Renato	14 May 1987		(Portugal) Sporting CP
5	MF	Pedro Soares	2 January 1987		
6	MF	Nuno Coelho	23 November 1987		(Portugal) F.C. Porto
7	FW	Bruno Gama (c)	15 November 1987		(Portugal) F.C. Porto
8	MF	João Coimbra	24 May 1986		(Portugal) S.L. Benfica
9	FW	José Branco	7 January 1987		(Portugal) F.C. Porto
10	FW	João Ribeiro	13 August 1987		(Portugal) F.C. Porto
11	FW	António Ferreira	15 January 1987		(Portugal) Sporting CP
12	GK	Igor Araújo			(Portugal) F.C. Porto
13	DF	Ruben Fernandes	6 May 1986		
14	DF	João Pedro	29 December 1987		(Portugal) F.C. Porto
15	FW	Manuel Pinto	26 June 1987		
16	FW	Diogo Tavares	29 July 1987		(Portugal) Sporting CP
17	MF	Feliciano Condesso	6 April 1987		(England) Southampton F.C.
18	DF	Mano	9 April 1987		
19	DF	Steven Vitória	11 January 1987		(Portugal) F.C. Porto
20	MF	Zezinando	1 January 1987		(Portugal) Sporting CP

== See also ==
- ACOLOP
- Lusophony Games
- 2006 Lusophony Games
- 2009 Lusophony Games
- Athletics at the 2006 Lusophony Games
- Basketball at the 2006 Lusophony Games
- Beach Volleyball at the 2006 Lusophony Games
- Football at the 2006 Lusophony Games
- Futsal at the 2006 Lusophony Games
- Taekwondo at the 2006 Lusophony Games
- Table Tennis at the 2006 Lusophony Games
- Volleyball at the 2006 Lusophony Games
