= October 2006 in sports =

<<	October 2006					>>
Su	Mo	Tu	We	Th	Fr	Sa
1	2	3	4	5	6	7
8	9	10	11	12	13	14
15	16	17	18	19	20	21
22	23	24	25	26	27	28
29	30	31
India; Sports

This list shows notable sports-related deaths, events, and notable outcomes that occurred in October of 2006.

== Deaths ==
- 28 Red Auerbach
- 28 Trevor Berbick
- 27 Joe Niekro
- 18 Marc Hodler
- 12 Johnny Callison
- 11 Cory Lidle
- 9 Paul Hunter
- 9 Glenn Myernick
- 7 Julen Goikoetxea
- 6 Buck O'Neil
- 6 Bertha Brouwer
- 6 Charlie Bradberry
- 5 Don Thompson
- 5 George King
- 4 Vic Heyliger
- 3 Peter Norman
- 1 André Viger

== Sporting seasons ==
- Auto racing 2006:
  - D1 Grand Prix
  - NASCAR; 2006 Chase for the NEXTEL Cup; Busch; Craftsman Truck
  - World Rally Championship
  - American Le Mans Series
  - Le Mans Series
  - FIA GT
- Basketball 2006–07:
  - Euroleague
  - Philippine Basketball Association
  - Australian National Basketball League
- Cricket 2006–07:
  - Australia
  - South Africa
- Cyclo-cross: 2006/07 Cyclo-cross World Cup
- Football 2006–07:
  - 2006–07 UEFA Champions League
  - 2006–07 UEFA Cup
- Rugby union 2006:
  - 2006–07 Heineken Cup
  - 2006–07 English Premiership
  - 2006–07 Top 14
  - 2006–07 Celtic League
  - 2007 Rugby World Cup qualifying
- Speed skating 2006–07:
  - Essent Cup 2006–07
- Volleyball 2006:
  - Men's CEV Champions League 2006–07
- U.S. and Canadian sports 2005–06:
  - 2006 CFL season
  - 2006 US college football season
  - 2006 NFL season
  - 2006–07 NHL season
  - 2006–07 NBA season

== 31 October 2006 (Tuesday) ==
- NBA 2006–07 Opening Night Games:
  - Chicago Bulls 108, Miami Heat 66. The Heat receive their championship rings from last season. Kirk Hinrich, who signed a five-year contract extension earlier today, scores 26 points for the Bulls and Chris Duhon adds 20. The Heat suffer their worst opening-night loss ever and the worst opening-night loss for a defending NBA champ, with Dwyane Wade (25 points) their only player in double figures.
  - Los Angeles Lakers 114, Phoenix Suns 106. The Suns hit their first nine shots and take a 19-point lead in the first quarter, but the Lakers, without the injured Kobe Bryant, come back, led by Lamar Odom with 34 points and 13 rebounds. Leandro Barbosa scores 30 in a losing effort.
- Football: 2006–07 UEFA Champions League Matchday 4
  - Group A: Barcelona 2–2 Chelsea
  - Group A: Levski Sofia 0–3 Werder Bremen
  - Group B: Spartak Moscow 0–1 Inter Milan
  - Group B: Bayern Munich 0–0 Sporting
  - Group C: Liverpool 3–0 Bordeaux
  - Group C: PSV Eindhoven 2–0 Galatasaray
  - Group D: Roma 1–1 Olympiakos
  - Group D: Shakhtar Donetsk 2–2 Valencia

== 30 October 2006 (Monday) ==
- NFL Monday Night Football: New England Patriots 31, Minnesota Vikings 7. Tom Brady throws for 372 yards and four touchdowns, each to a different receiver, as the Patriots cruise to their sixth consecutive regular-season road win.
- Rugby league: Rugby League Tri-Nations. Controversy breaks out when it emerges that New Zealand fielded an ineligible player in last Saturday's match against Great Britain. Nathan Fien had claimed eligibility to play for New Zealand through a NZ-born grandmother, but it emerges that the lady in question was his great-grandmother. (BBC)

== 29 October 2006 (Sunday) ==
- Cricket: 2006 ICC Champions Trophy in India:
  - 12th Match, Mohali, Chandigarh: Australia (252/4) defeats hosts India (249/8) by six wickets to advance to the semi-finals of the ICC Champions Trophy. India has been eliminated from the competition. (Scorecard)
- NFL Week 8
  - Green Bay Packers 31, Arizona Cardinals 14: Ahman Green runs for 106 yards and two touchdowns, and Vernand Morency adds 101 yards in the Packers' first home win of the year
  - Atlanta Falcons 29, Cincinnati Bengals 27: Michael Vick has his second-straight solid performance, going 20-for-28 for 291 yards and three touchdowns
  - Baltimore Ravens 35, New Orleans Saints 22: Drew Brees throws for 383 yards, but his three interceptions inhibit the Saints' attempt to come back from a 35–7 deficit
  - Tennessee Titans 28, Houston Texans 22: The Texans outgain the Titans, 427 yards to 197, but commit five turnovers
  - Jacksonville Jaguars 13, Philadelphia Eagles 6: With first-string quarterback Byron Leftwich injured, the Jaguars stick to the ground, running for 209 yards. The Eagles don't threaten to score until late in the third quarter
  - Kansas City Chiefs 35, Seattle Seahawks 28: Larry Johnson carries the ball 39 times for 155 yards and three touchdowns, including the game-winner with 2:15 left
  - Chicago Bears 41, San Francisco 49ers 10: The Bears return to form, building up a 41–0 halftime lead on big games from Rex Grossman and Thomas Jones
  - New York Giants 17, Tampa Bay Buccaneers 3: The Giants' defense dominates, holding Tampa Bay to 9 yards on its first six possessions. The Bucs go 0-for-3 on fourth-down conversions
  - San Diego Chargers 38, St. Louis Rams 24: LaDainian Tomlinson rushes for 183 yards and two touchdowns
  - Indianapolis Colts 34, Denver Broncos 31: Against a team that had only allowed two touchdowns all year, Peyton Manning goes 32-for-39 for 345 yards and three touchdowns, all to Reggie Wayne. Adam Vinatieri clinches the win with a 37-yard field goal with 2 seconds left
  - Cleveland Browns 20, New York Jets 13: The Browns win their second game when officials rule Chris Baker was out of bounds on a potential tying touchdown pass with 1:06 to play
  - Oakland Raiders 20, Pittsburgh Steelers 13: Ben Roethlisberger throws four interceptions, while the Raiders keep Pittsburgh in it by gaining only 98 yards on offense. Chris Carr returns a Roethlisberger pass 100 yards for a touchdown and tackles Nate Washington on the Oakland 4-yard line on the last play
  - Dallas Cowboys 35, Carolina Panthers 14: Tony Romo's first start for the Cowboys is a success as they beat the Panthers at Charlotte
    - Bye: Buffalo Bills, Detroit Lions, Miami Dolphins, Washington Redskins
- College football, AP NCAA Division I-A Top 25:
  - (16) Rutgers 24, UConn 13
- Darts World Grand Prix, Dublin
  - Phil Taylor wins his 7th World Grand Prix title beating Terry Jenkins 7–4 in the final
- Auto racing: Chase for the NEXTEL Cup
  - Bass Pro Shops 500: (1) Tony Stewart (2) Jimmie Johnson (3) Dale Earnhardt Jr.
    - For the second race in this chase, defending series champion Tony Stewart spoils things for the contenders

== 28 October 2006 (Saturday) ==
- Basketball: Red Auerbach, who coached the Boston Celtics to eight straight titles from 1959 to 1966, dies at the age of 89. He was the team's president up until his death, winning a total of 16 championships; nine as head coach, seven in the front office. (AP via Yahoo)
- Rugby league: Rugby League Tri-Nations
  - New Zealand 18–14 Great Britain. Great Britain score two tries in the final 10 minutes, including one with a minute to go, but still couldn't catch New Zealand, who at one point led 18–2. (BBC)
- Cricket: 2006 ICC Champions Trophy in India:
  - 11th Match, Group A, at Sardar Patel Stadium, Ahmedabad: England (276/7) beat West Indies (272/4) by three wickets. Kevin Pietersen saw England all the way to victory with nine balls to spare, making 90 not out, while Andrew Strauss and Ian Bell both made fifties. For West Indies, Chris Gayle and Dwayne Bravo made centuries, sharing a stand of 174, and Gayle's additional three wickets gave him the Man of the Match award in a losing cause. The match was insignificant in terms of semi-final qualification; West Indies were already qualified, while England were already eliminated. (Cricinfo)
- College football:
  - Associated Press NCAA Division I-A Top 25:
    - (1) Ohio State 44, Minnesota 0
    - (2) Michigan 17, Northwestern 3
    - Oregon State 33, (3) Southern California 31. The Trojans fall behind, 33–10, thanks to four turnovers, then fail on a two-point conversion attempt at the end of the game. USC's regular-season winning streak ends at 38 games.
    - (5) Texas 35, Texas Tech 31
    - (7) Auburn 23, Ole Miss 17
    - (8) Tennessee 31, South Carolina 24
    - (9) Florida 21, Georgia 14
    - (11) Notre Dame 38, Navy 14
    - (13) Arkansas 44, Louisiana–Monroe 10
    - (17) Wisconsin 30, Illinois 24
    - (18) Boston College 41, Buffalo 0
    - (19) Oklahoma 26, (23) Missouri 10
    - Oklahoma State 41, (20) Nebraska 29
    - (21) Georgia Tech 30, Miami 23
    - (22) Texas A&M 31, Baylor 21
    - (24) Wake Forest 24, North Carolina 17
    - (25) Oregon 55, Portland State 12
  - Other significant games:
    - Temple 28, Bowling Green 14. The Owls end the longest current losing streak in Division I-A at 20 games.

== 27 October 2006 (Friday) ==
- Major League Baseball:
  - 2006 World Series, Game Five: St. Louis Cardinals 4 Detroit Tigers 2. WP: Jeff Weaver (1–1) – LP: Justin Verlander (0–1) – SV: Adam Wainwright (1). HR: DET – Sean Casey (2). Adam Wainwright strikes Brandon Inge out to secure the final out of the series. David Eckstein wins the Series Most Valuable Player award. Cardinals win World Series, 4–1.
  - Bruce Bochy resigned as manager of the San Diego Padres to accept a similar job with their National League Western Division rival the San Francisco Giants, signing a two-year contract.
- Cricket: 2006 ICC Champions Trophy in India:
  - 10th Match, Group B, at Mohali, Chandigarh: South Africa (213/8) beat Pakistan (89) by 124 runs to qualify in first place from Group B. South Africa were 42 for five before Mark Boucher and Justin Kemp put on 131 for the sixth wicket. This was over 100 runs more than any other partnership managed, and 42 more than Pakistan's aggregate score. South Africa now face the runner-up in Group A in the semi-final. (Cricinfo)

== 26 October 2006 (Thursday) ==
- Baseball:
  - 2006 World Series Game Four: St. Louis Cardinals 5, Detroit Tigers 4. WP: Adam Wainwright (1–0). LP: Joel Zumaya (0–1). HR: DET — Sean Casey (1). David Eckstein doubled Aaron Miles home with the winning run as the Redbirds took advantage of sloppy play by the Tigers to move within one win of their first world championship since 1982. Cardinals lead series, 3–1.
  - Japan Series: The Hokkaido Nippon Ham Fighters defeat the Chunichi Dragons 4 games to 1, winning the last four games.
- Basketball: The 2006–07 Euroleague season begins with significant victories for Olympiacos, Cibona and Benetton Treviso who take the lead in their respective groups.
- American college football: AP NCAA Division I Top 25: Virginia Tech 24, (10) Clemson 7. Brandon Ore rushed for 203 yards in the Hokies' upset of the Tigers.
- Cricket: 2006 ICC Champions Trophy in India:
  - 9th Match, Group A, at Sardar Patel Stadium, Ahmedabad: Defending champions West Indies (224/7) defeat hosts India (223/9) by three wickets with two balls to spare, thus becoming the second team to qualify for the semi-finals. India captain Rahul Dravid admitted the margin of result probably flattered his team. (Cricinfo)

== 25 October 2006 (Wednesday) ==
- Cricket: 2006 ICC Champions Trophy in India:
  - 8th Match, Group B at Mohali, Chandigarh: New Zealand (274/7) (Scott Styris 86, Stephen Fleming 80) defeats Pakistan (223) by 51 runs to qualify for the semi-final as the first team. The result also sees Sri Lanka eliminated, and the Pakistan v South Africa clash is now an effective quarter-final. (Scorecard)
- 2006 World Series Game Four: Detroit Tigers at St. Louis Cardinals, postponed until Thursday due to rain. Cardinals lead series, 2–1. SI.com
- The Philadelphia Phillies' Ryan Howard and the New York Yankees' Derek Jeter were named the winners of the 2006 Hank Aaron Award for their respective leagues.

== 24 October 2006 (Tuesday) ==
- Cricket: 2006 ICC Champions Trophy, India:
  - Game 7, Group B, Sardar Patel Stadium, Ahmedabad: South Africa (219/9) defeats Sri Lanka (141) by 78 runs. South African all-rounder Shaun Pollock is declared Player of the Match after his inexpensive bowling figures of 2/21 from ten overs, claiming the vital wickets of Sanath Jayasuriya and Kumar Sangakkara. (Scorecard)
- Baseball:
  - 2006 World Series Game 3: St. Louis Cardinals 5, Detroit Tigers 0. WP: Chris Carpenter (1–0). LP: Nate Robertson (0–1). HRs: None. Chris Carpenter gives up only three hits and no walks in eight innings. The Cards score on a Jim Edmonds double, an error by Joel Zumaya and a wild pitch from Fernando Rodney. Cardinals lead series, 2–1.
  - New York Mets first baseman Carlos Delgado was named the winner of the 2006 Roberto Clemente Award for his charitable work.
- American football: National Football League owners approve a plan to play one or two regular-season games each year at sites outside of the U.S., starting in 2007. Game sites have not been announced but are likely to include Canada, Mexico, Great Britain and Germany. (AP via Yahoo)

== 23 October 2006 (Monday) ==
- NFL Monday Night Football: New York Giants 36, Dallas Cowboys 22. Bill Parcells lifts Drew Bledsoe for Tony Romo at halftime, only to see Romo throw three interceptions. However, the rationale for pulling Bledsoe was there, as he threw a costly interception that would have given Dallas a 14–12 lead. Terrell Owens has 98 yards receiving and a touchdown but drops an easy catch on fourth down. Tiki Barber has his third-straight 100-yard game.
- Baseball: Controversy surrounds Game 2 of the 2006 World Series after Detroit Tigers pitcher Kenny Rogers was found to have an unknown substance, believed by some to be pine tar, on a patch of his pitching hand during the first inning. Video shows a similar substance on his hand during Game 3 of the ALCS. Rogers washed his hands before coming out for the second inning. (FOX Sports)

== 22 October 2006 (Sunday) ==
- NFL Week 7:
  - Tampa Bay Buccaneers 23, Philadelphia Eagles 21: Matt Bryant kicks a 62-yard field goal (1 yard short of the NFL record) as time expires to win the game. Ronde Barber returns two Donovan McNabb interceptions for Tampa Bay's two touchdowns.
  - New York Jets 31, Detroit Lions 24: Jets rookie Leon Washington rushes for 129 yards and his first two career touchdowns.
  - Green Bay Packers 34, Miami Dolphins 24: Joey Harrington attempts 62 passes, completing 33 for 414 yards but also throwing three interceptions.
  - Kansas City Chiefs 30, San Diego Chargers 27: Lawrence Tynes misses an extra-point attempt and a 42-yard field goal, but wins the game on a last-minute, 53-yard kick.
  - Houston Texans 27, Jacksonville Jaguars 7: The Texans shock the Jaguars as David Carr throws for 224 yards and two touchdowns to Byron Leftwich's 125 yards and no scores.
  - Cincinnati Bengals 17, Carolina Panthers 14: Kevin Kaesviharn intercepts Jake Delhomme in the end zone late in the fourth quarter.
  - Atlanta Falcons 41, Pittsburgh Steelers 38 (overtime): In a shootout, Michael Vick throws for a career-high four touchdowns, three of them to Alge Crumpler. Ben Roethlisberger leaves the game in the third quarter after being knocked unconscious.
  - New England Patriots 28 Buffalo Bills 6: J. P. Losman throws an interception and fumbles three times.
  - Denver Broncos 17, Cleveland Browns 7: Denver holds Cleveland to 165 total yards; rookie Elvis Dumervil has three sacks and a fumble recovery.
  - Minnesota Vikings 31, Seattle Seahawks 13: The Vikings break the game open with a team-record, 95-yard touchdown run by Chester Taylor. Matt Hasselbeck leaves the game in the third quarter with a knee injury and does not return.
  - Oakland Raiders 22, Arizona Cardinals 9: Matt Leinart completes only 13 of 32 passes and throws two interceptions, and Edgerrin James manages only 34 yards rushing in the Raiders' first win of the season.
  - Indianapolis Colts 36, Washington Redskins 22: The Redskins lead at halftime, but three Peyton Manning touchdown passes in the third quarter put the Colts up to stay. Manning finishes with 342 yards and 4 touchdowns.
  - Other news: ESPN reports the NFL will suspend star Chargers linebacker Shawne Merriman for four games for taking steroids.
- Baseball:
  - 2006 World Series Game 2: Detroit Tigers 3, St. Louis Cardinals 1. WP: Kenny Rogers (1–0). LP: Jeff Weaver (0–1). SV: Todd Jones (1). HR: DET — Craig Monroe (2). For the third time in the postseason, Kenny Rogers does not give up a run in a start. He throws eight innings, allowing two hits and running his streak of scoreless innings in the 2006 postseason to 23. Series tied at 1–1.
  - In major non-postseason news, American baseball players and owners reach a tentative verbal agreement on a five-year labor contract.
- Auto racing:
  - Formula One 2006 Brazilian Grand Prix:
    - (1) (Brazil) Felipe Massa, (2) (Spain) Fernando Alonso, (3) (United Kingdom) Jenson Button
    - Massa becomes the first Brazilian to win his home Grand Prix since Ayrton Senna. Alonso retains the F1 Drivers' Championship for the second successive year, Michael Schumacher finishes his astonishing driving career in fourth place today. Renault win the Constructor's World Championship.
  - Chase for the NEXTEL Cup Subway 500:
    - (1) Jimmie Johnson, (2) Denny Hamlin, (3) Bobby Labonte
    - Jeff Burton, who was the Chase leader entering this race, blew his engine and ended up 42nd, while Matt Kenseth claimed the points lead after the race. Johnson moved to third behind Kevin Harvick with the win, on the weekend of the second anniversary of losing key Hendrick Motorsports personnel in a plane cash on their way to this very race.
- Rugby union: The New Zealand All Blacks name a 32-man squad for their end of year tour. Andy Ellis is the only newcomer in the side. One Sport

== 21 October 2006 (Saturday) ==
- 2006 World Series Game One: St. Louis Cardinals 7, Detroit Tigers 2. WP: Anthony Reyes (1–0). LP: Justin Verlander (0–1). HRs: STL — Scott Rolen (1), Albert Pujols (1). DET — Craig Monroe (1). In the first-ever matchup of two rookies to start a Game One of any World Series, Carlos Reyes gives up a run in the first inning, then retires seventeen straight Tigers in the first World Series game win for a National League team since the Florida Marlins won Game Six in 2003. Cardinals lead series, 1–0.
- College football:
  - Associated Press NCAA Division I-A Top 25:
    - (1) Ohio State 44, Indiana 3
    - (2) Michigan 20, Iowa 6
    - (5) Texas 22, (17) Nebraska 20
    - (6) Louisville 28, Syracuse 13
    - (7) Tennessee 16, Alabama 13
    - (8) Auburn 38, Tulane 13
    - (10) Notre Dame 20, UCLA 17
    - (11) Cal 31, Washington 24, OT
    - (12) Clemson 31, (13) Georgia Tech 7
    - (14) LSU 38, Fresno State 6
    - (15) Arkansas 38, Mississippi 3
    - Washington State 34, (16) Oregon 23
    - (18) Boise State 42, Idaho 26
    - (19) Rutgers 20, Pittsburgh 10
    - (20) Oklahoma 24, Colorado 3
    - (21) Wisconsin 24, Purdue 3
    - (22) Boston College 24, Florida State 19
    - (23) Texas A&M 34, Oklahoma State 33, OT
    - (24) Missouri 41, Kansas State 21
  - Other significant games:
    - Michigan State 41, Northwestern 38 — The Spartans erase a 38–3 third-quarter deficit. The 35-point comeback is the largest in Division I-A history and ties the all-division record.
- Artistic gymnastics, World Championships, apparatus finals:
  - Men's vault: (gold) (Romania) Marian Drăgulescu, (silver) (Belarus) Dimitri Kaspiarovich, (bronze) (Germany) Fabian Hambüchen
  - Women's balance beam: (gold) (Ukraine) Iryna Krasnianska, (silver) (Romania) Sandra Raduca Izbasa, (bronze) (Canada) Elyse Hopfner-Hibbs
  - Men's parallel bars: (gold) (China) Yang Wei, (silver) (Japan) Hiroyuki Tomita, (bronze) (South Korea) Yoo Won-chul
  - Women's floor: (gold) (China) Cheng Fei, (silver) (United States) Jana Bieger, (bronze) (Italy) Vanessa Ferrari
  - Men's horizontal bar: (gold) (Australia) Philippe Rizzo, (silver) (Slovenia) Aljaž Pegan, (bronze) (Greece) Vlasios Maras
    - China finishes the World Championships with Eight overall medals, all of them Gold. The next closest nation is the United States with six overall medals and none gold while Romania is the closest to China gold medal wise with two.
- Cricket:
  - 2006 Champions Trophy, group A: England (169) lose to Australia (170/4) in the teams' first encounter since the 2005 Ashes. England were 83 for nought before Shane Watson and Mitchell Johnson shared out three wickets each in the slide to 169 all out; the openers passed 40, while Paul Collingwood (22 not out) and James Anderson (15) were the only others to post double-figure scores. In reply, Australia were 34 for three before Damien Martyn and Michael Hussey put on 118 to take Australia within 18 runs of victory, and they won with six wickets and 13.1 overs to spare. (BBC)
- Rugby league: Rugby League Tri-Nations
  - Australia 20–15 New Zealand
- Rugby union:
  - 2006 Air New Zealand Cup Final
    - Waikato 37–31 Wellington
  - 2006 Heartland Championship
    - Meads Cup Final: Wanganui 14–16 Wairarapa Bush
    - Lochore Cup Final: Poverty Bay 46–34 King Country

== 20 October 2006 (Friday) ==
- College football: Associated Press NCAA Division I-A Top 25:
  - (4) West Virginia 37, Connecticut 11
- Cricket:
  - 2006 Champions Trophy, group B: New Zealand (165) lose to Sri Lanka (166/3) by seven wickets. Muttiah Muralitharan take four wickets for 23, while Upul Tharanga and Mahela Jayawardene add more than half the required runs for the second wicket as Sri Lanka made it to the target with 14 overs to spare. (BBC)
- Artistic gymnastics, World Championships, apparatus finals:
  - Men's floor: (gold) (Romania) Marian Drăgulescu, (silver) (Brazil) Diego Hypólito, (bronze) (Canada) Kyle Shewfelt
  - Women's vault: (gold) (China) Cheng Fei, (silver) (United States) Alicia Sacramone, (bronze) (Germany) Oksana Chusovitina.
  - Men's pommel horse: (gold) (China) Xiao Qin, (silver) (Australia) Prashanth Sellathurai, (bronze) Alexander Artemev.
  - Women's uneven bars: (gold) (United Kingdom) Beth Tweddle, (silver) (United States) Anastasia Liukin, (bronze) (Italy) Vanessa Ferrari.
  - Men's rings: (gold) (China) Chen Yibing, (silver) (Bulgaria) Yordan Yovchev, (bronze) (Netherlands) Yuri van Gelder. (BBC)

== 19 October 2006 (Thursday) ==
- Major League Baseball postseason:
  - National League Championship Series Game 7: St. Louis Cardinals 3, New York Mets 1. WP: Randy Flores (1–0). LP: Aaron Heilman (0–1). SV: Adam Wainwright (2). HRs: STL — Yadier Molina (2). Yadier Molina's two-run homer in the top of the ninth inning breaks the tie. The Mets load the bases in bottom of the inning, but Adam Wainwright strikes out Carlos Beltrán to clinch the pennant. Series MVP Jeff Suppan gives up one run on two hits in seven innings. Cardinals win series, 4–3.
- Football: 2006–07 UEFA Cup Matchday 1
  - Group A: Livorno 2–3 Rangers
  - Group A: Maccabi Haifa 3–1 Auxerre
  - Group B: Beşiktaş 0–2 Tottenham Hotspur
  - Group B: Club Brugge 1–1 Bayer Leverkusen
  - Group C: AZ Alkmaar 3–0 Braga
  - Group C: Slovan Liberec 0–2 Sevilla
  - Group D: Osasuna 0–0 Heerenveen
  - Group D: Odense 1–2 Parma
  - Group E: Wisła Kraków 1–2 Blackburn Rovers
  - Group E: FC Basel 1–1 Feyenoord
  - Group F: Austria Vienna 1–4 Zulte-Waregem
  - Group F: Sparta Prague 0–2 Espanyol
  - Group G: Panathinaikos 2–0 Hapoel Tel Aviv
  - Group G: Rapid Bucharest 0–0 Paris St-Germain
  - Group H: Eintracht Frankfurt 1–2 Palermo
  - Group H: Newcastle United 1–0 Fenerbahçe
- Artistic gymnastics
  - World Championships, women's all-around final: (gold) (Italy) Vanessa Ferrari, (silver) (United States) Jana Bieger, (bronze) Sandra Raduca Izbasa. Ferrari won the gold despite falling off the beam. (BBC)
  - World Championships, men's all-around final: (gold) (China) Yang Wei, (silver) (Japan) Hiroyuki Tomita, (bronze) (Germany) Fabian Hambüchen. (BBC)

== 18 October 2006 (Wednesday) ==
- Major League Baseball postseason:
  - National League Championship Series Game 6: New York Mets 4, St. Louis Cardinals 2. WP: John Maine (1–0). LP: Chris Carpenter (0–1). HRs: José Reyes (1). John Maine throws 5 1/3 scoreless innings, and Paul Lo Duca knocks in two runs with a seventh-inning single. Series tied at 3–3.
- Cricket:
  - 2006 ICC Champions Trophy, Group A. West Indies (234/8) defeats Australia (224/9) by ten runs at Brabourne Stadium, Mumbai. West Indies fast bowler Jerome Taylor claims a hat-trick, dismissing Michael Hussey, Brett Lee and Brad Hogg with consecutive deliveries. Runako Morton is awarded Player of the Match after his innings of 90 not out. (Scorecard)
- Football: 2006–07 UEFA Champions League Matchday 3
  - Group A: Werder Bremen 2–0 Levski Sofia
  - Group A: Chelsea 1–0 Barcelona
  - Group B: Inter Milan 2–1 Spartak Moscow
  - Group B: Sporting 0–1 Bayern Munich
  - Group C: Bordeaux 0–1 Liverpool
  - Group C: Galatasaray 1–2 PSV Eindhoven
  - Group D: Olympiakos 0–1 Roma
  - Group D: Valencia 2–0 Shakhtar Donetsk
- NFL: The New York Times reports that New York Giants running back Tiki Barber will likely retire following the season to pursue other interests such as a broadcasting career.
- Artistic gymnastics
  - World Championships, women's team final: (gold) (China) Zhou Zhuoru, Zhang Nan, Cheng Fei, Pang Panpan, He Ning, Li Ya (silver) (United States) Jana Bieger, Anastasia Liukin, Chellsie Memmel, Alicia Sacramone, (bronze) (Russia) Anna Grudko, Svetlana Klyukina, Polina Miller, Anna Pavlova, Kristina Pravdina, Elena Zamolodchikova (BBC)

== 17 October 2006 (Tuesday) ==
- Football: 2006–07 UEFA Champions League Matchday 3
  - Group E: Dynamo Kyiv 0–3 Olympique Lyonnais.
  - Group E: Steaua Bucharest 1–4 Real Madrid.
  - Group F: Celtic 3–0 Benfica.
  - Group F: Manchester United 3–0 København.
  - Group G: CSKA Moscow 1–0 Arsenal. A spectacular 25th-minute goal by Daniel Carvalho is enough to beat Arsenal for the first time in any competition since 26 August.
  - Group G: Porto 4–1 Hamburg.
  - Group H: Anderlecht 0–1 A.C. Milan.
  - Group H: Lille 3–1 AEK Athens. (UEFA.com)
- Major League Baseball postseason:
  - National League Championship Series Game 5: St. Louis Cardinals 4, New York Mets 2. WP: Jeff Weaver (1–1). LP: Tom Glavine (1–1). SV: Adam Wainwright (1). HRs: STL — Albert Pujols (1), Chris Duncan (1). The Redbirds used strong pitching from Jeff Weaver and homers from Albert Pujols and Chris Duncan to pull ahead of the Mets in the NLCS. Cardinals lead series 3–2.
- In non-postseason news:
  - The Chicago Cubs announce the hiring of Lou Piniella to a three-year contract as manager. (AP via WPVI-TV)
  - Major League Baseball announces a new national-television package in which Fox and TBS will share regular-season and playoff broadcasting rights through 2013. TBS will in turn, will surrender national telecasts of Atlanta Braves games which they had held since 1976 following the 2007 season. (AP via San Jose Mercury News)
- Artistic gymnastics
  - World Championships, men's team final: (gold) (China) Chen Yibing, Feng Jing, Liang Fuliang, Yang Wei, Xiao Qin, Zou Kai (silver) (Russia) Maxim Deviatovski, Dmitri Gogotov, Sergei Khorokhordin, Nikolai Kryukov, Yury Ryazanov, Alexander Safoshkin, (bronze) (Japan) Hisashi Mizutori, Takehito Mori, Takuya Natase, Eiichi Sekiguchi, Hiroyuki Tomita, Naoya Tsukahara. (BBC)
- Cricket:
  - 2006 ICC Champions Trophy, Group B: Pakistan (255/6) chase down Sri Lanka (253) to win their group match with eleven deliveries to spare. Abdul Razzaq is named Man of the Match, taking four wickets and scoring 38 unbeaten runs off 24 balls. (Cricinfo)

== 16 October 2006 (Monday) ==
- Cricket:
  - 2006 ICC Champions Trophy, Group B. New Zealand 195 defeats South Africa 108 by 87 runs at Brabourne Stadium, Mumbai. New Zealand captain Stephen Fleming is awarded Player of the Match for his innings of 89. (Scorecard)
- Major League Baseball postseason:
  - National League Championship Series: New York Mets at St. Louis Cardinals, Game 5, postponed until Tuesday. Series tied at 2–2.
- In non-postseason news:
  - Dominican authorities issue an arrest warrant for Chicago White Sox shortstop Juan Uribe. Authorities suspect Uribe and his bodyguard of shooting and wounding two people Friday night. (AP via MLB.com)
  - Ken Macha is fired as manager of the Oakland Athletics just two days after the A's were swept by the Detroit Tigers in the American League Championship Series.
- NFL Monday Night Football: Chicago Bears 24, Arizona Cardinals 23. The Bears remain unbeaten at 6–0, despite being down 20–0 at halftime and not scoring an offensive touchdown. Their comeback features two fumble returns for touchdowns and a punt return touchdown by Devin Hester. Neil Rackers misses a field goal with 53 seconds left that would have given the Cardinals the lead. In the postgame press conference, Cardinals head coach Dennis Green coined the phrase "They are who we thought they were!!" This quote did have meaning as both teams faced each other in the NFL Preseason. Green also gave permission for the media to "Crown the Bears Champions", in that same press conference.
- Netball:
  - 2006 Fisher and Paykel Series – Third Test (Christchurch)
    - Australia 46, New Zealand 40 (Australia win series 2–1) (TVNZ)

== 15 October 2006 (Sunday) ==
- Major League Baseball postseason:
  - National League Championship Series, Game 4: New York Mets 12, St. Louis Cardinals 5. WP: Óliver Pérez (1–0). LP: Brad Thompson (0–1). HRs: NYM — Carlos Beltrán 2 (3), David Wright (1), Carlos Delgado (3); STL — David Eckstein (1), Jim Edmonds (2), Yadier Molina (1). The Mets' bats come to life with Carlos Delgado the biggest star, hitting a three-run homer in the fifth inning that gave the Mets the lead for good and a two-run double in a six-run sixth. Series tied at 2–2.
- NFL Week 6:
  - Detroit Lions 20, Buffalo Bills 17: James Hall has 3.5 sacks, including one that stalls a potential tying Bills drive, and Kevin Jones rushes for 127 yards and a score.
  - Carolina Panthers 23, Baltimore Ravens 21: Jake Delhomme throws for 365 yards — with 189 of them to Steve Smith — and Julius Peppers has another big game on defense.
  - Tampa Bay Buccaneers 14, Cincinnati Bengals 13: The Bucs win their first game on a last-minute, fourth-down touchdown pass from Bruce Gradkowski to Michael Clayton after a replay booth official overturned that play after originally being ruled incomplete.
  - Dallas Cowboys 34, Houston Texans 6: The Cowboys trail at halftime, but Terrell Owens catches three touchdown passes in the second half.
  - New York Giants 27, Atlanta Falcons 14: Atlanta goes up on a club-record 90-yard Warrick Dunn touchdown run in the third quarter, but the Giants come back thanks to Jeremy Shockey (two touchdown receptions) and Tiki Barber (185 rushing yards).
  - New Orleans Saints 27, Philadelphia Eagles 24: The Saints conclude a 16-play, eight-minute drive with a last-second John Carney field goal.
  - Seattle Seahawks 30, St. Louis Rams 28: Moments after Torry Holt puts the Rams on top with a circus touchdown catch, Josh Brown hits a 54-yard field goal as time expires.
  - Tennessee Titans 25, Washington Redskins 22: Travis Henry rushes for 178 yards and a touchdown in Vince Young's first win as a pro.
  - Pittsburgh Steelers 45, Kansas City Chiefs 7: Ben Roethlisberger goes 16-for-19 for 238 yards and two touchdowns to win his first game of the year.
  - New York Jets 20, Miami Dolphins 17: The Jets go up 20–3 on two Laveranues Coles touchdown catches, then hold on as a last-minute 51-yard field goal attempt by Olindo Mare sails wide.
  - San Diego Chargers 48, San Francisco 49ers 19: LaDainian Tomlinson rushes for a career-high four touchdowns, and Philip Rivers throws for 334 yards and two more scores.
  - Denver Broncos 13, Oakland Raiders 3: The Broncos become the first team since the 1934 Lions to allow only one touchdown through five games, while the Raiders go 0–5 for the first time since 1964.
  - Bye: Cleveland Browns, Green Bay Packers, Indianapolis Colts, Jacksonville Jaguars, Minnesota Vikings, New England Patriots.
- American college football:
  - AP NCAA Division I-A Top 25: (20) Boise State 40, New Mexico State 28.
  - The ACC and Sun Belt Conference announce a total of 31 suspensions resulting from Saturday night's brawl between players from Miami (Florida) and Florida International. Thirteen Hurricanes and eighteen Golden Panthers draw suspensions. (ESPN)
  - Ohio State earns the top spot in the first official BCS rankings of the season.
- Cricket:
  - 2006 ICC Champions Trophy, Group A opening match, Jaipur: England (125) lose to India (126/6) by four wickets. India seam bowler Munaf Patel becomes Man of the Match after taking three wickets for 18 runs. (Cricinfo)
- Association football:
  - Chelsea goalkeeper Petr Čech undergoes surgery for a depressed skull fracture suffered in a collision with Stephen Hunt during the first minute of yesterday's match at Reading. The neurosurgeon who performed the operation said that Čech may be out for six weeks. (BBC)

== 14 October 2006 (Saturday) ==
- Major League Baseball postseason:
  - American League Championship Series, Game 4: Detroit Tigers 6, Oakland Athletics 3. WP: Wilfredo Ledezma (1–0). LP: Huston Street (0–1). HRs: DET — Magglio Ordóñez 2 (2). Magglio Ordóñez's three-run Walk off homer in the bottom of the ninth sends the Tigers to their first World Series since 1984. It's the first ALCS walk-off homer since Aaron Boones' for the New York Yankees in 2003 beat Boston in the eleventh inning of Game 7. Plácido Polanco, who went 9-for-17 in the series, is named ALCS most-valuable player. Tigers win series, 4–0.
  - National League Championship Series, Game 3: St. Louis Cardinals 5, New York Mets 0. WP: Jeff Suppan. LP: Steve Trachsel. HRs: STL — Suppan (1). Jeff Suppan gives up three hits in eight scoreless innings and homers for the Cards. Cardinals lead series, 2–1.
- Rugby league:
  - Super League XI grand final:
    - St Helens R.F.C. 26–4 Hull
      - St Helens Saints complete a clean sweep of trophies following triumphs in the league leader's shield and the Challenge Cup. They put five tries past Hull, including Keiron Cunningham's 150th career try. (BBC)
  - Rugby League Tri-Nations:
    - New Zealand 18–30 Australia
- Rugby union:
  - 2007 Rugby World Cup qualifying
    - Italy qualify as Europe 1.
    - Romania qualify as Europe 2.
  - 2006 Currie Cup final
    - Cheetahs 28–28 Blue Bulls
      - The match goes into extra time for the first time in the 127-year history of the Currie Cup after regular time leaves the teams level on 25 a piece. With 20 minutes of extra time unable to separate the two teams, the cup was awarded to both teams for the first time since 1979.
  - 2006 Air New Zealand Cup semifinals
    - Waikato 44–15 Otago — The Mooloo Men advance to next Saturday's final, where they will host Wellington.
  - 2006–07 Top 14
    - Stade Français defeat Biarritz 22–16 at France's national stadium, Stade de France in Saint-Denis. For the second straight year, the fixture between these two teams at this site sets a record for the largest crowd ever to see a regular-season league match in any French sport. The official attendance of 79,619 broke last year's record of 79,604.
- American college football:
  - AP NCAA Division I-A Top 25:
    - (1) Ohio State 38, Michigan State 7.
    - (11) Auburn 27, (2) Florida 17. The Tigers score all their points on defense and special teams in a shocking upset of the last unbeaten SEC team.
    - (3) Southern California 28, Arizona State 21.
    - (4) Michigan 17, Penn State 10. The Nittany Lions lose two quarterbacks in this loss to the Wolverines.
    - (5) West Virginia 41, Syracuse 17.
    - (6) Texas 63, Baylor 31.
    - (7) Louisville 23, Cincinnati 17.
    - (10) Cal 21, Washington State 3.
    - (14) LSU 49, Kentucky 0.
    - Indiana 31, (15) Iowa 28. The Hoosiers upset the Hawkeyes.
    - Vanderbilt 24, (16) Georgia 22. The Commodores stun the Bulldogs "between the hedges" with a last-second field goal for their first win in Athens in 22 years.
    - (17) Arkansas 63, Southeast Missouri 7.
    - (18) Oregon 30, UCLA 20.
    - Texas A&M 25, (19) Missouri 19.
    - (21) Nebraska 21, Kansas State 3.
    - (23) Oklahoma 34, Iowa State 9. The Sooners' win proves costly, as Heisman Trophy candidate Adrian Peterson breaks his collarbone. He will be out for at least the rest of the regular season.
    - (24) Rutgers 34, Navy 0.
    - (25) Wisconsin 48, Minnesota 12.
  - Other significant games:
    - Miami 35, Florida International 0. The first-ever meeting between the two schools, located only 9 miles/15 km apart, is marred by a sideline-clearing brawl that sees a total of 13 players from both teams ejected. (ESPN)
- Association football:
  - The Reading–Chelsea match, won by visiting Chelsea 1–0, sees both Chelsea goalkeepers, Petr Čech and Carlo Cudicini, stretchered off with head injuries. Čech was hospitalized, and Cudicini was treated and released. (BBC)
- Canadian football: The Edmonton Eskimos will miss the Canadian Football League playoffs for the first time since the 1971 CFL season, ending the longest postseason streak in all of professional sports after 35 years, thanks to the Toronto Argonauts' 28–25 victory in Commonwealth Stadium. The Eskimos' loss also ensures that the crossover rule will not occur this year for either division. (TSN)
- Netball:
  - 2006 Fisher and Paykel Series – Second Test (Auckland)
    - Australia 37, New Zealand 43
- Mixed Martial Arts:
  - UFC 64. Anderson Silva defeats Rich Franklin by 1st-round TKO to win the UFC Middleweight title. Also on the card, Sean Sherk wins the vacant lightweight title in a unanimous decision over Kenny Florian.

== 13 October 2006 (Friday) ==
- Rugby union: 2006 Air New Zealand Cup semifinals
  - Auckland 15–30 Wellington
- Major League Baseball postseason:
  - American League Championship Series: Detroit Tigers 3, Oakland Athletics 0. WP: Kenny Rogers (1–0). LP: Rich Harden (0–1). S: Todd Jones (2). HRs: DET — Craig Monroe (1). Kenny Rogers allows only two hits over 7 1/3 innings, and the Tigers give him enough support to put them on the brink of their first World Series appearance since winning in 1984. Tigers lead series, 3–0.
  - National League Championship Series, Game Two, St. Louis Cardinals 9, New York Mets 6. WP: Josh Kinney (1–0). LP: Billy Wagner (0–1). HRs: STL — Jim Edmonds (1), So Taguchi (1); NYM — Carlos Delgado 2 (2). Carlos Delgado's two homers both give the Mets a lead, but the Redbirds come back both times. So Taguchi, who came in as a defensive replacement in the bottom of the eighth, homers in the top of the ninth gives the Cards the lead, and they add two more runs in the inning and shut down the Mets for the win. Series tied at 1–1.
- Chess: World Championship 2006 concludes.
  - Vladimir Kramnik wins the match, defeating Veselin Topalov in a tie-break, becoming the first undisputed world chess champion for 13 years.
- Cricket: 2006 ICC Champions Trophy:
  - 5th Qualifying Match: Bangladesh (231/6) beats Zimbabwe (130) by 101 runs. Man of the Match Shahriar Nafees ends an unbeaten innings seven runs short of outscoring the Zimbabwe team. Shakib Al Hasan claimed three wickets. (Cricinfo)

== 12 October 2006 (Thursday) ==
- Major League Baseball postseason:
  - National League Championship Series, Game One: New York Mets 2, St. Louis Cardinals 0. WP: Tom Glavine (1–0). LP: Jeff Weaver (0–1). S: Billy Wagner (1). HR: NYM, Carlos Beltrán (1). Tom Glavine throws seven shutout innings for his 14th postseason win, combining with Guillermo Mota and Billy Wagner on the shutout, and Carlos Beltrán's two-run homer off Jeff Weaver in the sixth inning puts the New Yorkers one up in the series. Mets lead series, 1–0.
- American college football: AP NCAA Division I-A Top 25:
  - (12) Clemson 63, Temple 9
  - Boston College 22, (22) Virginia Tech 3
- Netball:
  - 2006 Fisher and Paykel Series – First Test (Wellington)
    - Australia 51, New Zealand 47

== 11 October 2006 (Wednesday) ==
- Association football: 2008 UEFA European Football Championship qualifying
  - Group A: Poland 2–1 Portugal
  - Group A: Belgium 3–0 Azerbaijan
  - Group A: Kazakhstan 0–2 Finland
  - Group A: Serbia 3–0 Armenia
  - Group B: France 5–0 Faroe Islands
  - Group B: Georgia 1–3 Italy
  - Group B: Ukraine 2–0 Scotland
  - Group C: Turkey 5–0 Moldova
  - Group C: Malta 2–1 Hungary
  - Group C: Bosnia and Herzegovina 0–4 Greece
  - Group D: Republic of Ireland 1–1 Czech Republic
  - Group D: Slovakia 1–4 Germany
  - Group D: Wales 3–1 Cyprus
  - Group E: Croatia 2–0 England
  - Group E: Russia 2–0 Estonia
  - Group E: Andorra 0–3 North Macedonia
  - Group F: Iceland 1–2 Sweden
  - Group F: Liechtenstein 0–4 Denmark
  - Group F: Northern Ireland 1–0 Latvia
  - Group G: Belarus 4–2 Slovenia
  - Group G: Luxembourg 0–1 Bulgaria
  - Group G: Netherlands 2–1 Albania
- Baseball:
  - Cory Lidle, a pitcher for the New York Yankees, is killed when the plane he was flying crashes into a condo on New York City's Upper East Side.
  - Major League Baseball postseason:
    - American League Championship Series Game 2: Detroit Tigers 8 Oakland Athletics 5. WP: Justin Verlander (1–0). LP: Esteban Loaiza (0–1). S: Todd Jones (1). HRs: DET, Alexis Gómez (1), Curtis Granderson (1). OAK, Milton Bradley 2 (2), Eric Chávez (1). Alexis Gómez, who had only one home run all season, goes 2-for-4 with a two-run homer, a two-run single and a sacrifice fly. The Athletics load the bases in the bottom of the ninth, but Frank Thomas flies out to end the game. Tigers lead series, 2–0.
    - National League Championship Series, St. Louis Cardinals at New York Mets, Game 1. Postponed due to rain. The game will be made up on Thursday with Friday for the rescheduled Game Two. Both teams plan to push their starting pitchers back one day.
- Basketball: Stephen Jackson of the Indiana Pacers to face criminal charges in relation to an incident outside a strip club in Indianapolis on October 6. (WISH TV Indiana)
- Cricket: 2006 ICC Champions Trophy:
  - 4th Qualifying Match, Jaipur: Bangladesh (161 all out) lose to West Indies (164/0) by ten wickets. West Indies and Sri Lanka qualified for the main round. (Cricinfo)

== 10 October 2006 (Tuesday) ==
- Baseball:
  - American League Championship Series: Detroit Tigers 5, Oakland Athletics 1. WP: Nate Robertson (1–0). LP: Barry Zito (0–1). HRs: DET — Brandon Inge (1), Iván Rodríguez (1). A homer and double from Inge and a homer from Rodríguez spark the Tigers offense, and four Tigers pitchers shut down the A's. Tigers lead series 1–0.
  - The New York Yankees announce manager Joe Torre will return for the 2007 season. (AP via Yahoo)
  - The Minnesota Twins pick up the option on center fielder Torii Hunter's contract for the 2007 season. Hunter will make $12 million next year. (AP via Yahoo)
- World Chess Championship
  - Vladimir Kramnik and Veselin Topalov draw in game 11. The series is still tied 5.5–5.5 and only one regular game is left. The winner of that match will be World Champion, another draw will start some rapid matches.
- Cricket: 2006 ICC Champions Trophy:
  - Sri Lanka 285/7 – 141 Zimbabwe, Sri Lanka wins by 144 runs.
- 2006 Lusophony Games:
  - Basketball at the 2006 Lusophony Games men's competition:
    - Angola 105–30 Guinea-Bissau
    - Macau 51–88 Cape Verde
    - (Timor-Leste) East Timor 69–178 Portugal
  - Basketball at the 2006 Lusophony Games women's competition:
    - Mozambique 71–45 Cape Verde
    - Portugal 97–32 Macau
  - Football at the 2006 Lusophony Games:
    - (gold) Portugal 2–0 Angola (silver)
    - Mozambique 0–1 Cape Verde (bronze)
  - Futsal at the 2006 Lusophony Games:
    - Angola 0–7 Brazil
    - Macau 13–4 East Timor (Timor-Leste)
- Table Tennis at the 2006 Lusophony Games:
  - men's doubles: (gold) (Portugal) Vitaly Efimov, Diogo José Dos Santos Pinho, (silver) (Portugal) Ricardo Filipe Oliveira, Diogo Miguel Martins Da Silva, (bronze) (Macau) Leong Kin Wa, Vong Hon Weng, (bronze) (Macau) Chan Kin Meng, Iam Tong Hou
  - women's doubles: (gold) (Brazil) Mariany Nonaka, Lígia Silva, (silver) (Brazil) Karin Sako, Jessica Yamada, (bronze) (Macau) Tam Sut Fei, Wong Iok Sim, (bronze) (Macau) Chan Lai Ha, Cheong Cheng I

== 9 October 2006 (Monday) ==
- NFL Monday Night Football: Denver Broncos 13, Baltimore Ravens 3: The Broncos win a defensive battle, picking off Steve McNair three times. A fourth-quarter pick by Darrent Williams leads to the game's only touchdown, a 4-yard reception by Rod Smith. Broncos linebacker Al Wilson has 16 total tackles.
- College basketball: Haris Charalambous, a 21-year-old backup center for Toledo originally from England, dies after collapsing during practice. (AP via Yahoo)
- 2006 Lusophony Games:
  - Basketball at the 2006 Lusophony Games men's competition:
    - Angola 120–42 Macau
    - (Timor-Leste) East Timor 25–172 Guinea-Bissau
    - Portugal 76–53 Cape Verde
  - Basketball at the 2006 Lusophony Games women's competition:
    - Mozambique 44–43 Portugal
    - Macau 52–78 Cape Verde
  - Futsal at the 2006 Lusophony Games:
    - Macau 0–2 Angola
    - Portugal 56–0 East Timor (Timor-Leste)
- Taekwondo at the 2006 Lusophony Games:
  - -80 kg men: (gold) (Brazil) Douglas Marcelino, (silver) (India) Ibrahim Khan, (bronze) (Mozambique) Eduardo Vieira, (bronze) (Angola) João Luhanga
  - +80 kg men: (gold) (Brazil) Leonardo Dos Santos, (silver) (Angola) Valantíno Pascoal, (bronze) (Portugal) Sérgio Afonso, (bronze) (São Tomé and Príncipe) José Amaro
  - Volleyball at the 2006 Lusophony Games men's competition:
    - Macau 0–3 Portugal
  - Volleyball at the 2006 Lusophony Games women's competition:
    - Macau 0–3 Portugal

== 8 October 2006 (Sunday) ==
- National Football League Week 5:
  - Chicago Bears 40, Buffalo Bills 7: The Bears force five turnovers and six three-and-outs to move to 5–0.
  - Carolina Panthers 20, Cleveland Browns 12: Jake Delhomme completes 20 of 29 passes for 170 yards and a touchdown; DeShaun Foster runs for 106 yards; and Julius Peppers harries Charlie Frye all afternoon.
  - Minnesota Vikings 26, Detroit Lions 17: The winless Lions self-destruct in the fourth quarter, turning the ball over three times and giving up 23 points.
  - New England Patriots 20, Miami Dolphins 10: Two Asante Samuel interceptions of Joey Harrington lead to New England's two touchdowns.
  - St. Louis Rams 23, Green Bay Packers 20: The Rams recover a Brett Favre fumble deep in Rams territory in the last minute.
  - New Orleans Saints 24, Tampa Bay Buccaneers 21: Reggie Bush returns a punt 65 yards for the go-ahead touchdown, then a pass interference call on Joey Galloway stalls the Bucs' comeback attempt.
  - Indianapolis Colts 14, Tennessee Titans 13: The Colts trail 10–0 at halftime but go ahead to stay on a touchdown reception by Reggie Wayne with 5:10 remaining in the game.
  - New York Giants 19, Washington Redskins 3: The Giants outgain the Redskins 411 yards to 164 thanks to solid performances by Tiki Barber, Eli Manning and the Giants defense.
  - Kansas City Chiefs 23, Arizona Cardinals 20: Matt Leinart throws for 253 yards in his first NFL start, but the Cardinals come up short when Neil Rackers misses a 51-yard field goal at the game's end.
  - Jacksonville Jaguars 41, New York Jets 0: The Jaguars swarm Chad Pennington, sacking him six times and intercepting him three more. Maurice Jones-Drew has two rushing touchdowns.
  - San Francisco 49ers 34, Oakland Raiders 20: The Raiders collapse in the second half for the second straight week, giving up 24 unanswered points. Frank Gore has a career-high 134 yards rushing.
  - Philadelphia Eagles 38, Dallas Cowboys 24: After the Eagles go ahead on Reggie Brown's 40-yard touchdown reception, the Eagles pick off Drew Bledsoe twice deep in Philadelphia territory. Lito Sheppard seals the game with a 102-yard interception return for a touchdown. Donovan McNabb throws for 354 yards, while Terrell Owens has three catches in his return.
  - San Diego Chargers 23, Pittsburgh Steelers 13: The Steelers go up 10–0 but fail to score in the second half thanks to constant pressure on Ben Roethlisberger, who throws two interceptions. Philip Rivers throws for 242 yards and two touchdowns.
  - Bye: Atlanta Falcons, Cincinnati Bengals, Houston Texans, Seattle Seahawks
- Athletics:
  - 2006 IAAF World Road Running Championships:
    - men individual: (gold) (Eritrea) Zersenay Tadese, (silver) (Kenya) Robert Kipkorir Kipchumba, (bronze) (Kenya) Wilson Kebenei
    - men team: (gold) (Kenya) Robert Kipkorir Kipchumba, Wilson Kebenei, Wilfred Taragon, (silver) (Eritrea) Zersenay Tadese, Yonas Kifle, Tesfayohannes Mesfen, (bronze) (Ethiopia) Deriba Merga, Tadesse Woldegebrel, Demssew Abebe
    - women individual: (gold) (Netherlands) Lornah Kiplagat, (silver) (Romania) Constantina Tomescu, (bronze) (Kenya) Rita Jeptoo
    - women team: (gold) (Kenya) Rita Jeptoo, Edith Masai, Eunice Jepkorir, (silver) (Ethiopia) Dire Arissi, Teyba Erkesso, Ashu Rabo, (bronze) (Japan) Kayoko Fukushi, Yurika Nakamura, Ryoko Kizaki
- Auto racing:
  - A1 Grand Prix, Czech Republic Grand Prix:
    - sprint race: (1) (Malaysia) Alex Yoong, (2) (Canada) James Hinchcliffe, (3) (France) Nicolas Lapierre
    - main race: (1) (Malaysia) Alex Yoong, (2) (Czech Republic) Tomáš Enge, (3) (Mexico) Salvador Durán
  - Formula One 2006 Japanese Grand Prix:
    - (1) (Spain) Fernando Alonso, (2) (Brazil) Felipe Massa, (3) (Italy) Giancarlo Fisichella
    - To win the Drivers' Championship Alonso requires 1 more point from the final race of the season, in Brazil, or for Michael Schumacher to not win that race. Schumacher suffered a rare engine failure in Japan.
  - NASCAR Chase for the NEXTEL CUP: UAW-Ford 500 at Talladega, Alabama
    - (1) Brian Vickers, (2) Kasey Kahne, (3) Kurt Busch — Vickers gets his first career NEXTEL Cup win, but he is booed by the fans in victory lane. On the final lap, Jimmie Johnson tries to pass Dale Earnhardt Jr. for the lead, followed closely by Vickers, but Vickers clips Johnson's rear during the attempt, taking out both Johnson and Earnhardt. Vickers is the Hendrick Motorsports teammate of Johnson and Jeff Gordon, but has been locked out of team meetings as a result of his announced move to Toyota after the completion of this season. Jeff Burton retains the lead in the Chase, now six points over Matt Kenseth.
- Major League Baseball postseason:
  - National League Division Series: St. Louis Cardinals 6, San Diego Padres 2. WP: Chris Carpenter (2–0). LP: Woody Williams (0–1). An RBI triple from Juan Encarnación breaks a 2–2 tie in the sixth inning, and the Cards go on to score four in that inning and squelch Padres threats in the last two innings. The Cardinals now face the New York Mets in the NLCS. Cardinals win series 3–1.
  - In non-postseason news, the New York Daily News reports that Joe Torre would be fired with one year left on his current contract with the New York Yankees and Lou Piniella would return for a third term as the Yankees skipper.
- Boxing:WBA World Championship fights:
  - light-heavyweight: (Poland) Tomasz Adamek 25–3 Paul Briggs (Australia)
  - heavyweight: (Russia) Nikolai Valuev wins by KO vs. Monte Barrett (United States)
- World Chess Championship
  - Vladimir Kramnik wins game ten versus Veselin Topalov and ties the series 5–5 with only two more matches left.
- Cricket: 2006 ICC Champions Trophy:
  - West Indies 90/1 – 85 Zimbabwe, West Indies wins by 9 wickets.
- Duathlon: 2006 ITU Duathlon European Championship:
  - men's team: (gold) (Portugal) Lino Barruncho, Joao Silva, Sergio Silva (silver) (France) Damien De Robert, Laurent Galinier, Benjamin Grenetier, (bronze) (Italy) Alessio Picco, Alessandro Lambruschini, Alessandro Alessandri
  - women's team: (gold) (Italy) Daniela Chmet, Laura Giordano, Nadia Cortassa, (silver) (Hungary) Renata Koch, Erika Csomor, Reka Brassay, (bronze) (Spain) Helena Herrero, Inmaculada Pereiro, Eva Ledesma
- Field hockey: 2006 Women's Hockey World Cup:
  - (gold) Netherlands, (silver) Australia, (bronze) Argentina
  - Minke Booij was named to be the World best player of the year.
- 2006 Lusophony Games:
  - Basketball at the 2006 Lusophony Games men's competition:
    - Angola 193–33 East Timor (Timor-Leste)
    - Portugal 113–61 Macau (Timor-Leste)
    - Cape Verde 70–37 Guinea-Bissau
  - Football at the 2006 Lusophony Games semi finals:
    - Mozambique 0–2 Portugal
    - Cape Verde 1–2 Angola
  - Volleyball at the 2006 Lusophony Games men's competition:
    - Macau 3–2 India
  - Volleyball at the 2006 Lusophony Games women's competition:
    - Macau 3–0 East Timor (Timor-Leste)
- Taekwondo at the 2006 Lusophony Games:
  - -58 kg men: (gold) (Brazil) Gilvan Santos, (silver) (Macau) Luís Gomes, (bronze) (India) Lakra Chandan, (bronze) (Cape Verde) Nick Barros
  - -68 kg men: (gold) (Brazil) Marcos Gonçalves, (silver) (Cape Verde) Joseph Fernandes, (bronze) (São Tomé and Príncipe) Eloy Boa Morte, (bronze) (Macau) Wai Tin Lin
- Rugby union: 2006 Air New Zealand Cup quarterfinals
  - North Harbour 21–56 Otago

== 7 October 2006 (Saturday) ==
- American college football: AP NCAA Division I-A Top 25:
  - (1) Ohio State 35, Bowling Green 7
  - Arkansas 27, (2) Auburn 10: The Razorbacks outrush the Tigers by over 200 yards in this stunning upset.
  - (3) Southern California 26, Washington 20
  - (4) West Virginia 42, Mississippi State 14
  - (5) Florida 23, (9) LSU 10
  - (6) Michigan 31, Michigan State 13
  - (7) Texas 28, (14) Oklahoma 10: For the second straight year, the Longhorns win the "Red River Shootout" at the Texas State Fair.
  - (13) Tennessee 51, (10) Georgia 33: The number one scoring defense in the country is shredded to pieces by the Vols.
  - (16) Cal 45, (11) Oregon 24
  - (12) Notre Dame 31, Stanford 10
  - (15) Clemson 27, Wake Forest 17: The Tigers used 21 unanswered points in a fourth quarter comeback to beat the Demon Deacons.
  - (18) Georgia Tech 27, Maryland 23
  - (19) Iowa 47, Purdue 17
  - (20) Boise State 55, Louisiana Tech 14
  - (22) Nebraska 28, Iowa State 14
  - (23) Missouri 38, Texas Tech 21
- Auto racing: Formula One 2006 Japanese Grand Prix qualification:
  - (1) (Brazil) Felipe Massa, (2) (Germany) Michael Schumacher, (3) (Germany) Ralf Schumacher
- Baseball:
  - Major League Baseball postseason
    - American League Division Series:
      - Detroit Tigers 8, New York Yankees 3. WP: Jeremy Bonderman (1–0). LP: Jaret Wright (0–1). HRs: DET — Magglio Ordóñez (1), Craig Monroe (2), NYY — Jorge Posada (1). The Tigers used longballs by Ordóñez and Monroe, along with 8 2/3 innings of strong pitching from Bonderman, to advance to the AL Championship Series which will open in Oakland Tuesday night. Tigers win series 3–1.
    - National League Division Series:
      - San Diego Padres 3, St. Louis Cardinals 1. WP: Chris Young (1–0). LP: Jeff Suppan (0–1). SV: Trevor Hoffman (1). HRs: STL — So Taguchi (1). The Padres stay alive in the series, with a two-run double by Russell Branyan in the fourth inning giving them all the runs they need. Cardinals lead series 2–1.
      - New York Mets 9, Los Angeles Dodgers 5. WP: Pedro Feliciano (1–0). LP: Jonathan Broxton (0–1). HRs: LA — Jeff Kent (1). The Mets — thanks to two RBIs apiece from ex-Dodgers Paul Lo Duca and Shawn Green — will open the NL Championship Series at home Wednesday night after sweeping the wildcard Dodgers. Mets win series 3–0.
  - Awards:
    - The first major postseason awards, the MLB Comeback Player of the Year Awards, are handed out, with the Dodgers' Nomar Garciaparra winning in the National League and Jim Thome of the Chicago White Sox winning in the American League.
- World Chess Championship
  - Veselin Topalov wins game nine to take a 5–4 lead in the series versus Vladimir Kramnik.
- Cricket: 2006 ICC Champions Trophy:
  - Sri Lanka 302/8 – 265/9 Bangladesh, Sri Lanka wins by 37 runs.
- Duathlon: 2006 ITU Duathlon European Championship in Rimini:
  - men's individual: (gold) (Czech Republic) Filip Ospalý, (silver) (Portugal) Lino Barruncho, (bronze) (France) Benjamin Grenetier
  - women's individual: (gold) (Portugal) Vanessa Fernandes, (silver) (Spain) Ana Burgos, (bronze) (Czech Republic) Vendula Frintová
- Fencing: 2006 World Fencing Championships in Turin:
  - men's foil team: (gold) France, (silver) (Germany) , (bronze) Italy, (bronze)
  - women's sabre team: (gold) France, (silver) United States, (bronze) Russia
- Association football: 2008 UEFA European Football Championship qualifying
  - Group A: Kazakhstan 0–1 Poland
  - Group A: Armenia 0–0 Finland
  - Group A: Serbia 1–0 Belgium
  - Group A: Portugal 3–0 Azerbaijan
  - Group B: Faroe Islands 0–1 Lithuania
  - Group B: Italy 2–0 Ukraine
  - Group B: Scotland 1–0 France
    - Frances' first qualification loss in 7 years
  - Group C: Hungary 0–1 Turkey
  - Group C: Greece 1–0 Norway
  - Group C: Moldova 2–2 Bosnia and Herzegovina
    - BiH fight back after being 2 goals down after 30 minutes
  - Group D: Czech Republic 7–0 San Marino
  - Group D: Cyprus 5–2 Republic of Ireland
  - Group D: Wales 1–5 Slovakia
    - Wales' heaviest home defeat for 98 years
  - Group E: England 0–0 North Macedonia
  - Group E: Croatia 7–0 Andorra
  - Group E: Russia 1–1 Israel
  - Group F: Sweden 2–0 Spain
  - Group F: Denmark 0–0 Northern Ireland
  - Group F: Latvia 4–0 Iceland
  - Group G: Romania 3–1 Belarus
  - Group G: Bulgaria 1–1 Netherlands
  - Group G: Slovenia 2–0 Luxembourg
- 2006 Lusophony Games:
  - The 2006 Lusophony Games are officially opened.
  - Volleyball at the 2006 Lusophony Games:
    - men: Portugal 3–0 India
    - women: Portugal 3–0 East Timor (Timor-Leste)
- Rugby union:
  - 2006 Air New Zealand Cup quarterfinals
    - Auckland 46–14 Bay of Plenty
    - Waikato 24–12 Southland
  - 2006 Currie Cup semifinals
    - Blue Bulls 45–30 Western Province
    - Cheetahs 30–14 Sharks
  - 2006–07 Top 14 regular season
    - Newcomers Montauban defeat league leaders Stade Français Paris 15–9, ending their nine-game winning streak.
- Weightlifting: 2006 World Weightlifting Championship in Santo Domingo:
  - men's −105 kg class: (gold) (Poland) Marcin Dołęga, (silver) (Russia) Dmitry Lapikov, (bronze) (Russia) Dmitriy Klokov
  - men's +105 kg class: (gold) (Iran) Hossein Reza Zadeh, (silver) (Ukraine) Artem Udachyn, (bronze) (China) Dong Feng
  - women's +75 kg class: (gold) (South Korea) Jang Mi-Ran, (silver) (China) Mu Shuangshuang, (bronze) (Ukraine) Olha Korobka
- Yacht racing:2006 Star World Championship
  - (gold) (New Zealand) Hamish Pepper/Carl Williams, (silver) (Brazil) Robert Scheidt/Bruno Prada, (bronze) (France) Xavier Rohart/Pascal Rambeau

== 6 October 2006 (Friday) ==
- Alpine skiing: General:
  - Janica Kostelić announces that she will not participate in this season's 2007 Alpine Skiing World Cup in order to fully recover from several injuries. Kostelić won the 2006 edition.
- American college football: AP NCAA Division I-A Top 25:
  - (8) Louisville 44, Middle Tennessee 17 at Nashville
- Major League Baseball postseason:
  - American League Division Series:
    - Oakland Athletics 8, Minnesota Twins 3. WP: Dan Haren (1–0). LP: Brad Radke (0–1). HRs: OAK — Eric Chavez (1), Milton Bradley (1); MIN — Torii Hunter (1), Justin Morneau (2). Chavez' homer in the second inning gives the A's the lead for good, and Marco Scutaro drives in four runs, including a three-run double in the seventh that breaks open the game. The A's win a postseason series for the first time since 1990, when they made their last World Series appearance. Athletics win series, 3–0.
    - Detroit Tigers 6, New York Yankees 0. WP: Kenny Rogers (1–0). LP: Randy Johnson (0–1). HRs: DET — Curtis Granderson (2). In the first postseason game in Detroit since 1987, the Tigers stake Rogers to a 3–0 lead in the second, and he allows five hits in 7 2/3 innings of work. Tigers lead series 2–1.
- In non-postseason news, Buck O'Neil, former Negro league player with the Kansas City Monarchs, dies at the age of 94 in Kansas City.
- Fencing: 2006 World Fencing Championships in Turin:
  - men's team sabre: (gold) France, (silver) Ukraine, (bronze) Russia
  - women's team épée: (gold) (China) , (silver) France, (bronze) (Germany)
- Field hockey: 2006 Women's Hockey World Cup semi-finals:
  - Netherlands 3–1 Argentina
  - Australia 1–0 Spain
- NHL Season Opening Games (All times US EDT):
  - New Jersey Devils 4, Carolina Hurricanes 0
  - Vancouver Canucks 3, Columbus Blue Jackets 2 (overtime)
  - Florida Panthers 8, Boston Bruins 3
  - Buffalo Sabres 5, Montreal Canadiens 4 (shootout; Buffalo wins shootout 2–0)
  - Anaheim Ducks 4, Los Angeles Kings 3
- 2006 Lusophony Games: Association football:
  - Cape Verde 7–0 Macau
  - Portugal 3–0 Guinea-Bissau
  - Angola 0–3 Mozambique
    - Result is awarded as Angola did not show up.
- Rugby union: 2006 Air New Zealand Cup quarterfinals:
  - Wellington 36–23 Canterbury
- Weightlifting: 2006 World Weightlifting Championship in Santo Domingo:
  - men's −94 kg class: (gold) (Kazakhstan) Ilya Ilin, (silver) (Poland) Szymon Kolecki, (bronze) (Russia) Roman Konstantinov
    - The top three all lift the same weight, meaning the lightest person (Ilin) takes the gold. Ilin lifts his weight in his first turn and fails twice to break the world record, which is currently Kolecki's.

== 5 October 2006 (Thursday) ==
- American college football: AP NCAA Division I-A Top 25:
  - NC State 24, (17) Florida State 20
- Major League Baseball postseason:
  - American League Division Series:
    - Detroit Tigers 4, New York Yankees 3. WP: Jamie Walker (1–0). LP: Mike Mussina (0–1). SV: Todd Jones (1). HRs: DET — Carlos Guillén (1); NYY — Johnny Damon (1). After Damon's three-run homer in the fourth gives the Yankees a 3–1 lead, the Tigers come back with runs in each of the next three innings. Guillén's homer in the sixth ties the game, and an RBI triple from Curtis Granderson supplies the winning margin. Series tied at 1–1.
  - National League Division Series:
    - St. Louis Cardinals 2, San Diego Padres 0. WP: Jeff Weaver (1–0). LP: David Wells (0–1). SV: Adam Wainwright (1). RBI singles from Albert Pujols and Jim Edmonds in the fourth inning give the Redbirds all the runs they need, as Weaver and four relievers hold the Padres to four hits. Cardinals lead series, 2–0.
    - New York Mets 4, Los Angeles Dodgers 1. WP: Tom Glavine (1–0). LP: Hong-Chih Kuo (0–1). SV: Billy Wagner (2). HRs: LAD — Wilson Betemit (1). Glavine tosses six shutout innings, and the Mets scratch out enough runs to put them on the brink of advancing. The Dodgers lose Nomar Garciaparra to an injury. Mets lead series, 2–0.
- World Chess Championship
  - Veselin Topalov wins the eighth game of the Championship to make it all square at 4–4. It was Topalov's first regular win, after the awarded game earlier in the tournament.
- Fencing: 2006 World Fencing Championships in Turin:
  - The men's épée team competition is won by France, although they were almost eliminated in the round of 16 versus the Netherlands. Spain became runners-up after they lost the final versus France, while Ukraine was too strong for Hungary in the bronze medal match.
  - Russia took away the gold in the women's foil team competition. They were the better side in the final versus Italy who took the silver. Poland lost their bronze medal match versus South Korea.
- Association football:
  - French goalkeeper Fabien Barthez, who was unattached this season, announces his retirement from all football at age 35. His last match was the 2006 FIFA World Cup final, in which Italy defeated France. During his France career, he earned 87 caps and won two major titles, the 1998 FIFA World Cup and Euro 2000. Barthez also won the 1993 UEFA Champions League with Olympique Marseille.
- NHL 2006–07 opening games:
  - Vancouver Canucks 3, Detroit Red Wings 1
  - Tampa Bay Lightning 3, Atlanta Thrashers 2 (shootout; Tampa Bay wins shootout 1–0)
  - New York Rangers 5, Washington Capitals 2: Jaromir Jagr scores 29 seconds into his first game as Rangers captain, and Brendan Shanahan scores twice for the Rangers, becoming the 15th NHL player to score 600 goals.
  - Pittsburgh Penguins 4, Philadelphia Flyers 0
  - Chicago Blackhawks 8, Nashville Predators 6
  - Minnesota Wild 3, Colorado Avalanche 2 (overtime)
  - Edmonton Oilers 3, Calgary Flames 1
  - Phoenix Coyotes 6, New York Islanders 3
  - San Jose Sharks 5, St. Louis Blues 4 (overtime)
- 2006 Lusophony Games: Association football:
  - Cape Verde – India 3–0
  - São Tomé and Príncipe – Portugal 0–6
  - East Timor – Angola 0–5
- Weightlifting: 2006 World Weightlifting Championships in Santo Domingo:
  - Cao Lei adds another gold medal to China's collection at the Championships. She beat Nadezhda Evstyukhina by only 1 kg in the −75 kg class to claim the gold. Zarema Kasaeva finished in third position for the bronze.
  - In the men's −85 kg class Andrei Rybakou was the strongest. He lifted 10 kg more than silver medalist Aslambek Ediev and 13 kg more than Tigran Martirosyan who took the bronze.

== 4 October 2006 (Wednesday) ==
- Baseball:
  - Major League Baseball postseason:
    - American League Division Series:
      - Oakland Athletics 5, Minnesota Twins 2. WP: Kiko Calero (1–0). LP: Pat Neshek (0–1). SV: Huston Street (2). HRs: OAK — Mark Kotsay (1); MIN — Michael Cuddyer (1), Justin Morneau (1). Both Cuddyer and Morneau hit back-to-back homers to even the game at 2–2 in the bottom of the sixth inning, but in the top of the seventh, Kotsay hits a line drive that eludes a diving Torii Hunter and rolls to the wall for a two-run inside-the-park home run, giving the A's the lead for good. The Twins will now face elimination in Oakland in Game 3. Athletics lead series, 2–0.
      - Detroit Tigers at New York Yankees, postponed. Rescheduled for Thursday at 1:09 PM. Yankees lead series, 1–0.
    - National League Division Series:
      - New York Mets 6, Los Angeles Dodgers 5. WP: Guillermo Mota (1–0). LP: Brad Penny (0–1). SV: Billy Wagner (1). HRs: NYM — Carlos Delgado (1), Cliff Floyd (1). In the first postseason game of his 14-year career, Delgado goes 4-for-5 with a homer and two RBI, while David Wright adds three RBI for the Mets. Mets lead series, 1–0.
  - Non-postseason news: The Texas Rangers fired manager Buck Showalter after four seasons helming the club. Showalter becomes the fifth overall manager — and first in the American League — to be replaced since Saturday (September 30).
- World Chess Championship
  - A draw in the seventh game between Vladimir Kramnik and Veselin Topalov leaves Kramnik still in the lead 4–3.
- Cycling:
  - Jaan Kirsipuu announces his retirement from professional cycling after Paris–Tours, which will be held on 8 October. The 37-year-old Estonian had won 4 Tour de France stages and a total of 126 career wins.
- Field hockey: 2006 Women's Hockey World Cup in Madrid:
  - A 1–1 draw versus England secures Spain their spot into the semi-finals alongside the Netherlands, Argentina and Australia.
- Association football:
  - The Luzhniki Stadium in Moscow has been chosen by UEFA to host the 2008 UEFA Champions League final. During the meeting in Ljubljana it was also decided the 2008 UEFA Cup Final will be held in the City of Manchester Stadium. The 2009 finals will be held in the Stadio Olimpico, Rome (Champions League) and the Şükrü Saracoğlu Stadium in Istanbul (UEFA Cup).
- Ice hockey:
  - National Hockey League, 2006–07 Season Openers:
    - Buffalo Sabres 3 Carolina Hurricanes 2 (shootout; Buffalo wins shootout, 1–0)
    - Ottawa Senators 4, Toronto Maple Leafs 3
    - Dallas Stars 3, Colorado Avalanche 2 (overtime)
  - Jim Balsillie, the co-CEO of Research In Motion Ltd., the company that makes the BlackBerry wireless messaging device, wipurchases the Pittsburgh Penguins for $175 million (US).
- 2006 Lusophony Games:
  - Although the Lusophony Games have not officially opened, the football tournament has already kicked off.
    - India – Macau 2–0
    - Mozambique – East Timor 5–0
    - Guinea-Bissau – São Tomé and Príncipe 0–3
- Weightlifting: 2006 World Weightlifting Championships in Santo Domingo:
  - China's sixth gold medal out of nine events was won in the women's −63 kg class. Quyang Xiaofang lifted a total of 246 kg to create a gap of 5 kg to Russia's Svetlana Shimkova who finished in second position. The bronze was won by Armenian Meline Daluzyan.
  - Russians were on top at the women's −69 kg class. Oxana Slivenko excelled by lifting a total amount of 263 kg, which was 18 kg more than her compatriot Tatiana Matveeva lifted for the silver. Jean Elisabeth Lassen of Canada won the bronze.

== 3 October 2006 (Tuesday) ==
- Fencing: 2006 World Fencing Championships in Turin:
  - Hungarian Tímea Nagy claims the gold at the women's épée by defeating Irina Embrich of Estonia in the final. Losing semifinalists Emese Szász of Hungary and Laura Flessel-Colovic of France take the bronze.
  - During the men's foil competition German Peter Joppich defeats Italian Andrea Baldini to win gold. Another Italian, Stefano Barrera, and Chinese Lei Sheng both earn bronze medals.
- Field hockey: 2006 Women's Hockey World Cup in Madrid:
  - The Netherlands's easy 6–1 win over China earns them a place in the semifinals together with Argentina and Australia who already qualified from the other pool. Three more nations are in the run for the last available spot. Spain, England and Germany will decide which team will qualify on October 4.
- Association football:
  - UEFA Cup: Group stage draw (UEFA.com)
    - Group A: Auxerre, Rangers, Partizan Belgrade, Livorno, Maccabi Haifa
    - Group B: Bayer Leverkusen, Club Brugge, Beşiktaş, Dinamo Bucharest, Tottenham Hotspur
    - Group C: Sevilla, AZ Alkmaar, Slovan Liberec, Grasshoppers, Sporting Braga
    - Group D: Parma, Lens, Heerenveen, Osasuna, Odense
    - Group E: Feyenoord, FC Basel, Wisła Kraków, Blackburn Rovers, Nancy
    - Group F: Ajax, Sparta Prague, Espanyol, Austria Vienna, Zulte-Waregem
    - Group G: Panathinaikos, Paris Saint-Germain, Rapid Bucharest, Hapoel Tel Aviv, Mladá Boleslav
    - Group H: Newcastle United, Celta Vigo, Palermo, Fenerbahçe, Eintracht Frankfurt
  - General:
    - Aston Villa signs unattached Chris Sutton.
    - Feyenoord chairman Jorien van den Herik sends a letter to about 100.000 fans to clarify the recent problems at the club as well the financial situation and their projects like their Fetteh Football Academy in Ghana. He also stated he will only resign when someone intends to buy Feyenoord.
- Baseball:
  - Major League Baseball postseason:
    - American League Division Series:
      - Oakland Athletics 3, Minnesota Twins 2. WP: Barry Zito (1–0). LP: Johan Santana (0–1). SV: Huston Street (1). HRs: OAK — Frank Thomas 2 (2); MIN — Rondell White (1). The A's used two Thomas home runs — his first after a postseason absence of thirteen seasons — and eight strong innings of pitching from Zito to steal the home field advantage from the Twins at the Metrodome. Athletics lead series, 1–0.
      - New York Yankees 8, Detroit Tigers 4. WP: Chien-Ming Wang (1–0). LP: Nate Robertson (0–1). HRs: NYY — Jason Giambi (1), Derek Jeter (1); DET — Craig Monroe (1), Curtis Granderson (1). Jeter ties a postseason record with five hits, including two doubles and a homer, and Bobby Abreu drives in four as the Yankees win easily. Yankees lead series, 1–0.
    - National League Division Series:
      - St. Louis Cardinals 5, San Diego Padres 1. WP: Chris Carpenter (1–0). LP: Jake Peavy (0–1). HR: STL — Albert Pujols (1). Pujols' two-run homer in the fourth inning was all Chris Carpenter needed as the Cards beat the Padres for the fourth straight post-season meeting in two years. Cardinals lead series, 1–0.
  - Non-postseason news: The Florida Marlins fired manager Joe Girardi after serving the first year of a three-year guaranteed contract, replacing him a few hours later with Fredi González, who previously served as the third-base coach for the Atlanta Braves. It is expected that Girardi will take over the Chicago Cubs in the near future.(ABC News America)
- Weightlifting: 2006 World Weightlifting Championships in Santo Domingo:
  - China claims another two gold medals as Qiu Hongxia and Qiu Hongmei take the gold in the women's −53 kg and the women's −58 kg respectively. The silver medals were awarded to Indonesia's Raema Lisa Rumbewas (−53 kg) and Svetlana Tsarukaeva (−58 kg) from Russia. Thailands Suda Chaleephay (−53 kg) and Kameaim Wandee (−58 kg) won the bronze.
  - Taner Sağır from Turkey turned out to be the world's best weightlifter in the −77 kg class. He lifted 2 kg more than his opponent Li Hongli (silver) and 4 kg more than Armenian Ara Khachatryan (bronze).

== 2 October 2006 (Monday) ==
- General sport:
  - The World Anti-Doping Agency and Interpol are cooperating in the charge against doping. Both organisations reached a Memorandum of Understanding to get the deal started.
- Basketball: University Athletics Association of the Philippines 69th basketball tournament – Championship round (Philippine Daily Inquirer):
  - Men's Finals: (3) UST Growling Tigers 76, (1) Ateneo Blue Eagles 74 (Overtime) – With Ateneo leading by five in regulation, the Tigers answered with five unanswered points to force overtime. In the extra period, the Eagles committed several blunders to set up a thrilling finish; with UST up by one point with three seconds left, the Tigers split their freethrows, as Ateneo missed a desperation three-pointer, sealing UST's 19th men's basketball trophy. Jojo Duncil was named Finals MVP.
- World Chess Championship
  - A draw leaves Vladimir Kramnik leading Veselin Topalov 3 1/2 – 2 1/2.
- Fencing: 2006 World Fencing Championships in Turin:
  - men's épée: (gold) (China) Wang Lei, (silver) (Portugal) Joaquim Videira, (bronze) (Canada) Igor Tikhomirov, (bronze) (Estonia) Sven Järve
  - women's sabre: (gold) (United States) Rebecca Ward, (silver) (United States) Mariel Zagunis, (bronze) (United States) Sada Jacobson, (bronze) (South Korea) Kim Hye-Lim
- Field hockey: 2006 Women's Hockey World Cup in Madrid:
  - Argentina's 2–0 win in group B over South Korea and Australia's 0–0 draw versus Japan in the same group are good enough to already qualify for the semi-finals while there is still a match to play. The teams face each other on 4 October to decide who will be the groups winner.
- Formula One: General
  - As of 2010 South Korea will hold a Grand Prix during the Formula One season. The yet to be built circuit will be located near Cholla and will cost about €210 million.
- Major League Baseball:
  - The Chicago Cubs announce that they will not renew the contract of manager Dusty Baker, and the San Francisco Giants make the same announcement regarding Felipe Alou. (ESPN – Baker) (ESPN – Alou)
- NFL:
  - Monday Night Football: Philadelphia Eagles 31, Green Bay Packers 9: Donovan McNabb throws for two touchdowns and runs for two more as the Eagles win going away.
  - In off-field news, Tennessee Titans defensive tackle Albert Haynesworth is suspended five games for stomping Dallas Cowboys center Andre Gurode in the face during their game Sunday in Nashville. (The Washington Post)
- Tennis: French player Anthony Dupuis is suspended by the ITF for a total of two months after testing positive to have used salbutamol. He also had to pay back his prize money worth €24,000. Dupuis states he used the substance as a medicine against his asthma. However Dupuis is suspended the ITF believes his story and only put him on hold for two months instead of two years which is a standard.
- Weightlifting: 2006 World Weightlifting Championship in Santo Domingo:
  - men's −62 kg class: (gold) (China) Qiu Le, (silver) (Colombia) Óscar Figueroa, (bronze) (Colombia) Diego Fernando Salazar
  - men's −69 kg class: (gold) (France) Venceslas Dabaya, (silver) (China) Shi Zhiyong, (bronze) (Bulgaria) Demir Demirev
  - women's −48 kg class: (gold) (China) Yang Lian, (silver) (Thailand) Wiratthaworn Aree, (bronze) (Japan) Hiromi Miyake
    - Yang sets a triple World record (snatch, press and total); Aree, Miyake and fourth placed Svetlana Ulyanova all lift 188 kg in total. The lightest person in weight (Aree) is placed in the highest position.

== 1 October 2006 (Sunday) ==
- Auto racing:
  - A1 Grand Prix: 2006–07 A1 Grand Prix of Nations, Netherlands:
    - Sprint race: (1) (South Africa) Adrian Zaugg, (2) (Mexico) Salvador Durán, (3) (France) Nicolas Lapierre
    - Main race: (1) (Germany) Nico Hülkenberg, (2) (United States) Philip Giebler, (3) (Australia) Ryan Briscoe
      - Dutch rookie Jeroen Bleekemolen finishes fourth at his home track.
  - Formula One: 2006 Chinese Grand Prix:
    - (1) (Germany) Michael Schumacher, (2) (Spain) Fernando Alonso, (3) (Italy) Giancarlo Fisichella
      - Schumacher and Alonso are now equal in points, but Schumacher leads as he won more races in the season so far.
  - NASCAR Chase for the NEXTEL Cup:
    - Banquet 400: (1) (United States) Tony Stewart, (2) (United States) Casey Mears, (3) (United States) Mark Martin
      - Both Stewart and Mears ran out of gas during the race in the final lap.
- Fencing: 2006 World Fencing Championships in Turin:
  - men's sabre: (gold) (Russia) Stanislav Pozdnyakov, (silver) (Hungary) Zsolt Nemcsik, (bronze) (Russia) Aleksey Frosin, (bronze) (South Korea) Won Woo-Young
  - women's foil: (gold) (Italy) Margherita Granbassi, (silver) (Italy) Valentina Vezzali, (bronze) (Italy) Giovanna Trillini, (bronze) (Hungary) Aida Mohamed
- Association football:
  - Brazilian goalkeeper Dida announces he will never play for the Brazilian team anymore. Dutchman Mark van Bommel had the same message for Netherlands national football team manager Marco van Basten as he was called up, after not being called up since the 2006 FIFA World Cup.
  - Heerenveen chairman Riemer van der Velde resigns after being in charge of the team for 23 years. He will be succeeded by Koos Formsma.
- Golf:
  - WGC-American Express Championship: (1) (United States) Tiger Woods, (2) (England) Ian Poulter, (2) (Australia) Adam Scott
    - It was Woods' 6th consecutive win.
- Baseball:
  - Major League Baseball:
    - American League playoff races:
      - Kansas City Royals 10, Detroit Tigers 8 (12 Innings): The Tigers fail to get the win that would have given them the Central title.
      - Minnesota Twins 5, Chicago White Sox 1: The Twins take advantage of the Tigers' loss, and win the Central by one game. The Tigers are now the wild card.
    - National League playoff races:
      - Atlanta Braves 3, Houston Astros 1: The Astros lose, giving the Cards the Central.
      - Milwaukee Brewers 5, St. Louis Cardinals 3: The Redbirds return to their recent losing ways, but nonetheless back into the Central crown thanks to the Astros' loss.
      - Los Angeles Dodgers 4, San Francisco Giants 3: The Dodgers win the wild card due to the Padres win over the D-Backs.
      - San Diego Padres 7, Arizona Diamondbacks 6: The Padres rally in the ninth to clinch their second N.L. West title in a row.
    - Non-playoff news:
      - Chicago Cubs president Andy MacPhail announces his resignation.
      - All five players named in a Los Angeles Times report yesterday as alleged users of performance-enhancing drugs—Roger Clemens, Andy Pettitte, Miguel Tejada, Brian Roberts, and Jay Gibbons—deny the allegations reportedly made by former player Jason Grimsley. (ESPN)
  - 2006 Holland Series:
    - Corendon Kinheim claims the Holland Series title after winning the fifth and final match of the series 13–5. Kinheim were trailing opponents Konica Minolta Pioniers 1–0 and 2–1 in the best-of-five series, but managed to come back twice and clinch the victory at home.
- National Football League Week 4:
  - Atlanta Falcons 32, Arizona Cardinals 10: Jerious Norwood scores on the longest run in Falcons history (78 yards), Morten Andersen kicks five field goals, and for the third time this season, the Falcons defense keeps the opposing offense out of the end zone. Cardinals coach Dennis Green announces that QB Kurt Warner will be benched next week in favor of rookie Matt Leinart.
  - Dallas Cowboys 45, Tennessee Titans 14: Terrell Owens returns from a broken hand and an accidental overdose of painkillers, but the Cowboys' real star is Terry Glenn, who catches two Drew Bledsoe touchdown passes. Vince Young makes his first start for the Titans.
  - Indianapolis Colts 31, New York Jets 28: Peyton Manning leads the Colts on the winning drive in the final two minutes, finishing it with a 1-yard touchdown run, and the Colts survive a Cal-Stanford play on the game's final play.
  - Houston Texans 17, Miami Dolphins 15: David Carr passes for a touchdown and runs for the winning score, and 2006 top pick Mario Williams gets his first sack after four games.
  - Minnesota Vikings 17, Buffalo Bills 12
  - Carolina Panthers 21, New Orleans Saints 18: The Saints, emotionally drained from last Monday night's return to New Orleans, lose their first game of the season despite 349 yards passing from Drew Brees.
  - Baltimore Ravens 16, San Diego Chargers 13: Steve McNair throws a touchdown pass to Todd Heap with 34 seconds left for the winning points, sending the Chargers to their first loss of the season.
  - Kansas City Chiefs 41, San Francisco 49ers 0: In a total team effort from the Chiefs, Damon Huard throws for two touchdowns, Larry Johnson runs for 101 yards and two touchdowns, Dante Hall scores on a Huard pass and a punt return, and the defense sacks Alex Smith five times and holds the Niners to 165 total yards.
  - St. Louis Rams 41, Detroit Lions 34: The Rams come from behind three times, paced by a 328-yard and three-touchdown passing performance by Marc Bulger.
  - Cleveland Browns 24, Oakland Raiders 21: The previously winless Browns come back from 21–3 down thanks to three touchdown passes from Charlie Frye. The Raiders remain winless at 0–3, their worst start since 1961.
  - Washington Redskins 36, Jacksonville Jaguars 30 (OT): Santana Moss catches three Mark Brunell touchdown passes, the last a 68-yard play to end the game.
  - New England Patriots 38, Cincinnati Bengals 13: Laurence Maroney runs for 125 yards and two touchdowns to lead the Pats. The Bengals become the third previously unbeaten team to go down today.
  - Chicago Bears 37, Seattle Seahawks 6: In a battle of unbeatens, the Bears rout the Seahawks behind two passing touchdowns from Rex Grossman and two rushing touchdowns from Thomas Jones.
  - Bye: Denver Broncos, New York Giants, Pittsburgh Steelers, Tampa Bay Buccaneers
- Rugby league: National Rugby League, Australia:
  - The Brisbane Broncos win the 2006 National Rugby League premiership, defeating the Melbourne Storm 15–8 at Telstra Stadium in Sydney. It is the sixth premiership for the Broncos since their entry into the NRL competition in 1988. (ABC Australia)
- Weightlifting: 2006 World Weightlifting Championship in Santo Domingo:
  - men's −56 kg class: (gold) (China) Li Zheng, (silver) (Cuba) Sergio Alvarez Boulet, (bronze) (Vietnam) Ahn Taun Hoang
