= Athletics at the 2006 Lusofonia Games =

Athletics at the 1st Lusophone Games
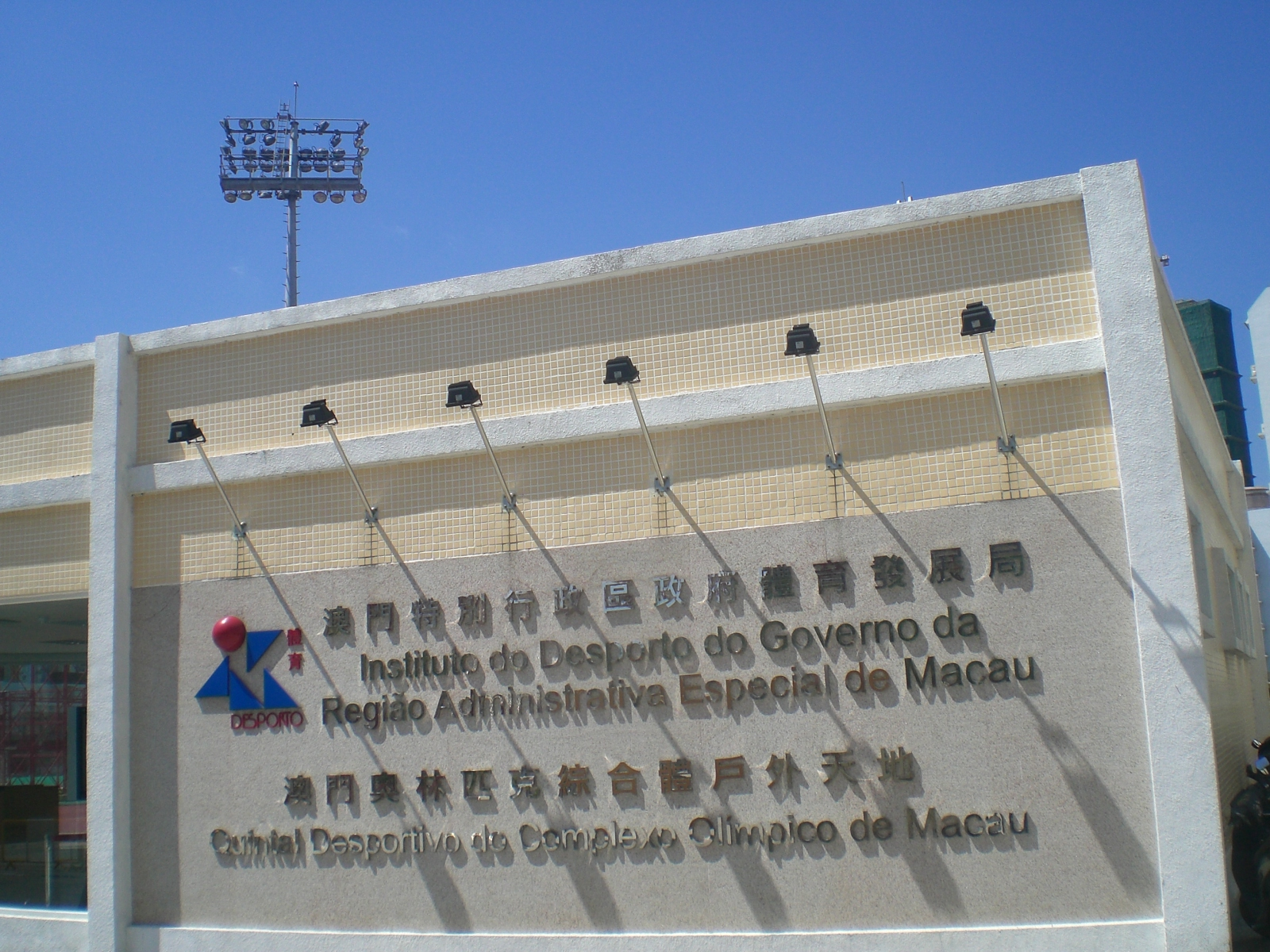
- The host stadium in Macau
- Dates: 11–12 October
- Host city: Macau, China
- Venue: Macau Stadium
- Level: Senior
- Events: 31
- Participation: ? athletes from 11 nations

The athletics competitions at the 2006 Lusophone Games were held in the Macau Stadium on October 11 and 12. Brazil was the dominating delegation taking 19 out of 30 gold medals (63% of the total), while Sri Lanka managed to grab all three of gold medals it won in the Games in this sport. A total of 31 events were held, comprising 15 corresponding events for men and women, plus the men's 3000 metres steeplechase.

Although the competition primarily featured junior and lower-quality senior international athletes, a number of well-known performers competed, including Susanthika Jayasinghe of Sri Lanka (who completed a 100 and 200 metres double), 1996 Olympic champion Fernanda Ribeiro and Portuguese triple jumper Nelson Évora.

== Medal table ==
Rank	Nation	Gold	Silver	Bronze	Total
1	Brazil	19	15	7	41
2	Portugal	6	13	15	34
3	Sri Lanka	3	2	1	6
4	Mozambique	2	0	2	4
5	Cape Verde	1	0	0	1
6	São Tomé and Príncipe	0	1	0	1
7	Macau	0	0	5	5
8	Guinea-Bissau	0	0	1	1
9	Angola	0	0	0	0
9	India	0	0	0	0
9	Timor-Leste	0	0	0	0
Totals (11 entries)		31	31	31	93

== Results ==
=== Men's ===
Event	Gold		Silver		Bronze	
100 m	Jorge Celio Sena (BRA)	10.42	Rafael Ribeiro (BRA)	10.57	Ricardo Monteiro (POR)	10.83
200 m	Connor Curley (BRA)	21.55	Arnaldo Abrantes (POR)	21.92	Holder da Silva (GNB)	22.42
400 m	Fernando Almeida (BRA)	46.88	Rohitha Pushpakumara (SRI)	47.61	Paulo Ferreira (POR)	51.46
800 m	Kléberson Davide (BRA)	1:50.50	Diego Chargal Gomes (BRA)	1:51.50	Renato Silva (POR)	1:51.63
1500 m	Chaminda Indika Wijekoon (SRI)	3:56.67	Tiago Rodrigues (POR)	3:56.96	António Travassos (POR)	3:57.55
5000 m	Sergio Silva (BRA)	14:22.40	Carlos da Silva (POR)	14:42.52	Eder Silva (BRA)	14:42.86
Half marathon	Nelson Cruz (CPV)	1:09:08	Licinio Pimentel (POR)	1:09:36	Rui Teixeira (POR)	1:09:51
110 m hurdles	Rodrigo Pereira (BRA)	14.00	Eder Souza (BRA)	14.06	Luís Sá (POR)	14.59
400 m hurdles	Kurt Couto (MOZ)	50.29 NR	Raphael Fernandes (BRA)	50.55	Edivaldo Monteiro (POR)	51.66
3000 m steeplechase	Pedro Ribeiro (POR)	8:58.11	Alberto Paulo (POR)	8:59.07	Iurquen Roese (BRA)	9:38.44
High jump	Fábio Baptista (BRA)	2.12 m	Rafael Gonçalves (POR)	2.10 m	Guilherme Cobbo (BRA)	2.10 m
Long jump	Rogério Bispo (BRA)	7.79 m	Thiago Dias (BRA)	7.52 m	José Gaspar (POR)	7.24 m
Triple jump	Nelson Évora (POR)	16.30 m	Hilton da Silva (BRA)	15.66 m	Sampath Weerasinghe (SRI)	15.62 m
Shot put	Marco Fortes (POR)	17.73 m	Gustavo Mendonça (BRA)	17.01 m	Ronald Odair Julião (BRA)	16.10 m
4 × 100 m relay	Brazil (BRA); Thiago Dias; Fernando Almeida; Jorge Celio Sena; Rafael Ribeiro	40.28	Portugal (POR)	41.12	Macau (MAC)	42.37
4 × 400 m relay	Brazil (BRA); Diego Venâncio; Kléberson Davide; Raphael Fernandes; Fernando Almeida	3:07.81	Sri Lanka (SRI)	3:14.10	Portugal (POR)	3:14.96
WR world record | AR area record | CR championship record | GR games record | NR national record | OR Olympic record | PB personal best | SB season best | WL world leading (in a given season)

=== Women's ===
Event	Gold		Silver		Bronze	
100 m	Susanthika Jayasinghe (SRI)	11.42	Franciela Krasucki (BRA)	11.77	Thaissa Presti (BRA)	12.01
200 m	Susanthika Jayasinghe (SRI)	23.20	Franciela Krasucki (BRA)	24.12	Elisa Cossa (MOZ)	24.57
400 m	Cristina Elaine (BRA)	55.38	Carla Ratão (POR)	57.40	Joana Frias (POR)	1:00.52
800 m	Leonor Piuza (MOZ)	2:07.34	Geisiane de Lima (BRA)	2:13.76	Gisiane Bertoni (BRA)	2:13.94
1500 m	Sandra Teixeira (POR)	4:25.43	Sabine Heitling (BRA)	4:26.78	Lidia Sousa (POR)	4:40.47
5000 m	Sabine Heitling (BRA)	17:19.37	Celma Bonfim (STP)	18:17.12	Un Ieng Wong (MAC)	21:44.45
Half marathon	Mónica Silva (POR)	1:22:34	Fernanda Ribeiro (POR)	1:24:57	Leong Lai Heong (MAC)	1:39:52
100 m hurdles	Lucimara da Silva (BRA)	13.57	Fabiana Moraes (BRA)	14.07	Telma Cossa (MOZ)	14.09
400 m hurdles	Amanda Dias (BRA)	58.25	Gisele Cruz (BRA)	1.01.05	Catarina Bastos (POR)	1.03.55
High jump	Marisa Anselmo (POR)	1.84 m	Monica Freitas (BRA)	1.81 m	Sofia Pires (POR)	1.70 m
Long jump	Tânia Silva (BRA)	5.96 m	Patricia Venancio (BRA)	5.95 m	Patrícia Mamona (POR)	5.65 m
Triple jump	Tânia Silva (BRA)	13.42 m	Susana Costa (POR)	12.46 m	Patrícia Mamona (POR)	12.15 m
Shot put	Kelly Medeiros (BRA)	15.08 m	Dulce da Silva (POR)	14.14 m	Anna Paula Pereira (BRA)	13.67 m
4 × 100 m relay	Brazil (BRA); Lucimara da Silva; Franciela Krasucki; Thaissa Barbosa; Amanda Dias	45.58	Portugal (POR)	48.26	Macau (MAC)	50.93
4 × 400 m relay	Brazil (BRA); Paixao Elaine; Lucimara da Silva; Gisele Cruz; Amanda Dias	3:42.01	Portugal (POR)	3:49.90	Macau (MAC)	4:09.17
WR world record | AR area record | CR championship record | GR games record | NR national record | OR Olympic record | PB personal best | SB season best | WL world leading (in a given season)

== See also ==
- ACOLOP
