= Beach volleyball at the 2006 Lusofonia Games =

The Beach Volleyball tournament of the 2006 Lusophone Games was played in Macau, People's Republic of China. The venue was the Tennis Academy. The tournament was played from 13 to 15 October 2006, and there was both the men's and women's competition.

The medals were distributed between Brazil and Portugal teams, with the former winning both tournaments and a silver medal, and the latter grabbing a silver and two bronze medals.

Pos	Country:	Gold	Silver	Bronze	Total:
1	Brazil	2	1	0	3
2	Portugal	0	1	2	3
3	Angola	0	0	0	0
3	Cape Verde	0	0	0	0
3	(Timor-Leste) East Timor	0	0	0	0
3	Guinea-Bissau	0	0	0	0
3	India	0	0	0	0
3	Macau	0	0	0	0
3	Mozambique	0	0	0	0
3	São Tomé and Príncipe	0	0	0	0
3	Sri Lanka	0	0	0	0
		2	2	2	6

== Men's competition ==
=== Main bracket ===
First round
M1	(Brazil) Maciel/Costa
bye
M2	(Angola) Morais/Emanuel
(Guinea-Bissau) Pina/Fidelis
M3	(São Tomé and Príncipe) Tomé/Da Graça
(Brazil) Borges/Ramos
M4	(Portugal) Rosas/Pedrosa
(Macau) Cheong/Choi
M5	(Macau) Lai/Leong
(India) Sawant/Sawant
M6	(India) Mohan/John
(Sri Lanka) Silva/Perera
M7	(Cape Verde) Valdir/Heriberto
(Timor-Leste) Guterres/Mousinho
M8	(Portugal) Maia/Lopes
bye

Second round
M9	(Brazil) Maciel/Costa
(Angola) Morais/Emanuel
M10	(Brazil) Borges/Ramos	2
(Portugal) Rosas/Pedrosa	1
M11	(Macau) Lai/Leong
(Sri Lanka) Silva/Perera
M12	(Cape Verde) Valdir/Heriberto	0
(Portugal) Maia/Lopes	2

Quarter-final
M21	(Brazil) Maciel/Costa
(Brazil) Borges/Ramos
M22	(Sri Lanka) Silva/Perera	0
(Portugal) Maia/Lopes	2

Semi-final
M25	(Cape Verde) Valdir/Heriberto
(Sri Lanka) Silva/Perera

=== Losers Bracket ===
First round
M13	bye
(Guinea-Bissau) Pina/Fidelis
M14	(São Tomé and Príncipe) Tomé/Da Graça
(Macau) Cheong/Choi
M15	(India) Sawant/Sawant
(India) Mohan/John
M16	(Timor-Leste) Guterres/Mousinho
bye

Second round
M17	(Guinea-Bissau) Pina/Fidelis
(Cape Verde) Valdir/Heriberto
M18	(Macau) Cheong/Choi
(Macau) Lai/Leong
M19	(India) Mohan/John	0
(Portugal) Rosas/Pedrosa	2
M20	(Timor-Leste) Guterres/Mousinho
(Angola) Morais/Emanuel

Quarter-final
M23	(Cape Verde) Valdir/Heriberto
(Macau) Cheong/Choi
M24	(Portugal) Rosas/Pedrosa	2
(Angola) Morais/Emanuel	0

Semi-final
M26	(Portugal) Rosas/Pedrosa	2
(Brazil) Borges/Ramos	1

=== Semi-final ===
M27	(Brazil) Maciel/Costa	-	(Sri Lanka) Silva/Perera

M28	(Portugal) Maia/Lopes	-	(Portugal) Rosas/Pedrosa

=== Bronze-medal match ===
M29	(Sri Lanka) Silva/Perera	0 - 2	(Portugal) Maia/Lopes

=== Gold-medal match ===
M30	(Brazil) Maciel/Costa	2 - 0	(Portugal) Rosas/Pedrosa

The winners were Billy Maciel and Giuliano Costa; after the match, Giuliano stated that "Brazil has been winning everything in volleyball, whether in the under-19 or adult categories. Before we traveled to represent our country, we reached the agreement that we would do everything we could to honor Brazil. And, thank God, that is what happened".

== Female's Competition ==
=== Main bracket ===
First round
W1	(Brazil) Rocha/Secomandi
bye
W2	(Guinea-Bissau) Cá/da Silva
(Angola) Isabel/da Costa
W3	(Cape Verde) Delgado/Firmino	0
(Portugal) Costa/Freches	2
W4	(Macau) Tong/Cheang
bye
W5	(Macau) Leong/Wong
bye
W6	(Brazil) Saldanha/Maestrini
(India) Mascarenhas/Rodriguese
W7	(Mozambique) Cumbi/Canhandula
(Sri Lanka) Gunawaridana/ Wijesinghe
W8	(Portugal) Castro/Antunes
bye

Second round
W9	(Brazil) Rocha/Secomandi
(Angola) Isabel/da Costa
W10	(Portugal) Costa/Freches	2
(Macau) Tong/Cheang	0
W11	(Macau) Leong/Wong
(Brazil) Saldanha/Maestrini
W12	(Mozambique) Cumbi/Canhandula	0
(Portugal) Castro/Antunes	2

Quarter-final
W21	(Brazil) Rocha/Secomandi	2
(Portugal) Costa/Freches	1
W22	(Brazil) Saldanha/Maestrini	2
(Portugal) Castro/Antunes	1

Semi-final
W25	(Portugal) Castro/Antunes	2
(Mozambique) Cumbi/Canhandula	0

=== Losers Bracket ===
First round
W13	bye
(Guinea-Bissau) Cá/da Silva
W14	(Cape Verde) Delgado/Firmino
bye
W15	bye
(India) Mascarenhas/Rodriguese
W16	(Sri Lanka) Gunawaridana/ Wijesinghe
bye

Second round
W17	(Guinea-Bissau) Cá/da Silva
(Mozambique) Cumbi/Canhandula
W18	(Cape Verde) Delgado/Firmino
(Macau) Leong/Wong
W19	(India) Mascarenhas/Rodriguese
(Macau) Tong/Cheang
W20	(Sri Lanka) Gunawaridana/ Wijesinghe
(Angola) Isabel/da Costa

Quarter-final
W23	(Mozambique) Cumbi/Canhandula
(Macau) Leong/Wong
W24	(Macau) Tong/Cheang
(Sri Lanka) Gunawaridana/ Wijesinghe

Semi-final
W26	(Portugal) Costa/Freches	2
(Sri Lanka) Gunawaridana/ Wijesinghe	0

=== Semi-final ===
W27	(Brazil) Rocha/Secomandi	-	(Portugal) Castro/Antunes

W28	(Brazil) Saldanha/Maestrini	-	(Portugal) Costa/Freches

=== Bronze-medal match ===
W29	(Portugal) Castro/Antunes	-	(Portugal) Costa/Freches

=== Gold-medal match ===
W30	(Brazil) Richa/Secomandi	-	(Brazil) Saldanha/Maestrini

The winners were Camilla Saldanha and Liliane Maestrini, beating Elize Maia and Ana Richa, with the latter stating that "it should be my last medal", given that she already was pregnant of three months.

== See also ==
- ACOLOP
- Lusophony Games
- 2006 Lusophony Games
