= Sri Lanka at the Lusofonia Games =

Sri Lanka has competed in the first three editions of the Lusofonia Games, a multi-sport event for Portuguese-speaking countries, as a member of ACOLOP. Sri Lanka participated in the 2006 games in Macau, the first edition of the Lusophone Games. Sri Lanka has sent athletes to all three editions of the Lusofonia Games and won medals at each of them. Sri Lanka has won a total of eleven gold medals, with three in 2006, one in 2009 and seven in 2014.

Both the 2017 edition in Maputo, Mozambique, and the subsequent 2021 event in Luanda, Angola, were cancelled. It is not known whether any further editions will be held in the future.

Overall performance of Sri Lanka in the Lusofonia Games.

== Medal table by sports ==
Pos	Sport	Gold	Silver	Bronze	Total
1	Athletics	8	7	8	23
2	Wushu	3	2	2	7
3	Beach volleyball	0	2	1	3
4	Taekwondo	0	1	4	5
5	Table tennis	0	1	1	2
6	Football	0	0	1	1
6	Judo	0	0	1	1
	Total	11	13	18	42

== See also ==
- 2006 Lusofonia Games
- 2009 Lusofonia Games
- 2014 Lusofonia Games
