= Football at the 2006 Lusofonia Games =

The Football tournament of the 2006 Lusofonia Games was played in Macau, People's Republic of China. The venues were the Campo Desportivo e Pavilhão da U.C.T.M. and the Macau Stadium. The tournament was played from 4 to 10 October 2006, and it was only a men's competition. The tournament was won by favourites Portugal who were represented by their under-20s team, defeating Angola in the final. Cape Verde won the bronze medal defeating Mozambique. The major absentee was the Brazilian team who decided not to take part in the games.

== Football medal table by country ==
| Pos | Country: | Gold | Silver | Bronze | Total: |
|---|---|---|---|---|---|
| 1 | Portugal | 1 | 0 | 0 | 1 |
| 2 | Angola | 0 | 1 | 0 | 1 |
| 3 | Cape Verde | 0 | 0 | 1 | 1 |

== First round ==
=== Group A ===
| Team | Pld | W | D | L | GF | GA | GD | Pts |
|---|---|---|---|---|---|---|---|---|
| Cape Verde | 2 | 2 | 0 | 0 | 10 | 0 | +10 | 6 |
| India | 2 | 1 | 0 | 1 | 2 | 3 | −1 | 3 |
| Macau | 2 | 0 | 0 | 2 | 0 | 9 | −9 | 0 |

| India | 2–0 | Macau |
| Cape Verde | 3–0 | India |
| Cape Verde | 7–0 | Macau |

=== Group B ===
| Team | Pld | W | D | L | GF | GA | GD | Pts |
|---|---|---|---|---|---|---|---|---|
| Mozambique | 2 | 2 | 0 | 0 | 8 | 0 | +8 | 6 |
| Angola | 2 | 1 | 0 | 1 | 5 | 3 | +2 | 3 |
| (Timor-Leste) East Timor | 2 | 0 | 0 | 2 | 0 | 10 | −10 | 0 |

| Mozambique | 5–0 | (Timor-Leste) East Timor |
| Angola | 0–3 | Mozambique |
| East Timor (Timor-Leste) | 0–5 | Angola |

=== Group C ===
| Team | Pld | W | D | L | GF | GA | GD | Pts |
|---|---|---|---|---|---|---|---|---|
| Portugal | 2 | 2 | 0 | 0 | 9 | 0 | +9 | 6 |
| São Tomé and Príncipe | 2 | 1 | 0 | 1 | 3 | 6 | −3 | 3 |
| Guinea-Bissau | 2 | 0 | 0 | 2 | 0 | 6 | −6 | 0 |

| Guinea-Bissau | 0–3 | São Tomé and Príncipe |
| Portugal | 3–0 | Guinea-Bissau |
| São Tomé and Príncipe | 0–6 | Portugal |

== Semi-final ==
| Portugal; Diogo Conceição 65'; António Nunes 67' | 2–0 | Mozambique |

| Cape Verde; Héldon Ramos 25' | 1–2 | Angola; Joaquim Nzanba 28' joão Barros 64' |

== Bronze Medal ==
| Mozambique | 0–1 | Cape Verde; Da Graça 78' |

== Gold Medal ==
| Portugal; Bruno Vilela 4'; Nuno Coelho 29' | 2–0 | Angola |

== See also ==
- ACOLOP
- Lusofonia Games
- 2006 Lusofonia Games
