= Football at the Lusofonia Games =

- Organiser(s): ACOLOP
- Founded: 2006
- Teams: 5
- Current champions: India (2014)
- Most championships: Portugal; Cape Verde; India (1 title each)

Football at the Lusofonia Games was first held in the first edition in Macau, in 2006. Only the men's tournament has been contested so far.

== Men's tournament ==
Lusofonia Games
Year	Host	Winner	Runner-up	3rd Place
2006; Details	Macau, China	Portugal	Angola	Cape Verde
2009; Details	Lisbon, Portugal	Cape Verde	Portugal	Angola
2014; Details	Goa, India	India	Mozambique	Sri Lanka
