= Futsal at the 2006 Lusofonia Games =

The Futsal tournament of the 2006 Lusophony Games was played in Macau, People's Republic of China. The venue was the Macao East Asian Games Dome. The tournament was played from 9 to 14 October 2006, and there was just the men's competition.

Despite drawing with Portugal in the final game and ending with the same points, Brazil eventually won the tournament by advantage on goal average.

== Futsal medal table by country ==
Pos	Country:	Gold	Silver	Bronze	Total
1	Brazil	1	0	0	1
2	Portugal	0	1	0	1
3	Angola	0	0	1	1
4	(Timor-Leste) East Timor	0	0	0	0
5	Macau	0	0	0	0

== Male Competition ==
=== Round robin ===
Team	Pld	W	D	L	GF	GA	GD	Pts
Brazil	4	3	1	0	111	1	+110	10
Portugal	4	3	1	0	83	2	+81	10
Angola	4	2	0	2	27	14	+13	6
Macau	4	1	0	3	14	55	−41	3
Timor-Leste	4	0	0	4	7	169	−162	0

Macau	0–2	Angola
Portugal	56–0	Timor-Leste
Brazil	7–0	Angola
Macau	13–4	Timor-Leste
Brazil	27–0	Macau
Angola	1–4	Portugal
Portugal	22–0	Macau
Timor-Leste	0–76	Brazil
Portugal	1–1	Brazil
Timor-Leste	3–24	Angola

== See also ==
- ACOLOP
- Lusophony Games
- 2006 Lusophony Games
