= Table tennis at the 2006 Lusofonia Games =

The Table Tennis tournament of the 2006 Lusophony Games was played in Macau, People's Republic of China. The venue was the Macao East Asian Games Dome Theatre. The tournament was played from 9 to 11 October 2006, and there was both the men's and women's competition with singles, doubles, and mixed doubles.

Pos	Country:	Gold	Silver	Bronze	Total:
-	Brazil	3	3	2	8
-	Portugal	2	2	3	7
-	Macau	0	0	5	5
-	(Timor-Leste) East Timor	0	0	0	0
-	India	0	0	0	0
		5	5	10	20

== Male Singles ==
=== Round robin ===
==== Group A ====
Team	Pts	Pld	W	L	PF	PA
(Macau) Kin Wa Leong	4	2	2		6	
(India) Reagan Pinto	3	2	1	1	4	3
(Timor-Leste) Araujo da Silva	2	2		2		6

==== Group B ====
Team	Pts	Pld	W	L	PF	PA
(Portugal) André da Silva	6	3	3		9	
(Brazil) Humberto Manhani	5	3	2	1	6	4
(India) Noel Noronha	4	3	1	2	4	9
(Timor-Leste) Constancio da Silva	3	3		3		9

==== Group C ====
Team	Pts	Pld	W	L	PF	PA
(Brazil) Ricardo Kojima	6	3	3		9	3
(Portugal) Ricardo Oliveira	5	3	2	1	8	3
(Macau) Wing Lung Ho	4	3	1	2	4	6
(India) Narayan Ghantker	3	3		3		9

==== Group D ====
Team	Pts	Pld	W	L	PF	PA
(Portugal) Ivo Silva	6	3	3		9	1
(Macau) Chi Yung Cheong	5	3	2	1	6	5
(Brazil) Eric Mancini	4	3	1	2	6	6
(Timor-Leste) António Soares Xavier	3	3		3		9

=== Brackets ===
Quarter Final
(Macau) Kin Wa Leong	2
(Portugal) Ricardo Oliveira	4
(Brazil) Humberto Manhani	0
(Portugal) Ivo Silva	4
(Brazil) Ricardo Kojima	4
(Macau) Chi Yung Cheong	2
(India) Reagan Pinto	0
(Portugal) André da Silva	4

Semi Final
(Portugal) Ricardo Oliveira	4
(Portugal) Ivo Silva	1
(Brazil) Ricardo Kojima	0
(Portugal) André da Silva	4

Final
(Portugal) Ricardo Oliveira	4
(Portugal) André da Silva	1

== Female Singles ==
=== Round robin ===
==== Group A ====
Team	Pts	Pld	W	L	PF	PA
(Brazil) Lígia Silva	8	4	4		12	1
(Portugal) Leila Oliveira	7	4	3	1	10	4
(Macau) Sut Fei Tam	6	4	2	2	7	6
(Portugal) Ana Teresa Torres	5	4	1	3	4	9
(Timor-Leste) Diana Fernandes	4	4		4		12

==== Group B ====
Team	Pts	Pld	W	L	PF	PA
(Brazil) Karin Sako	8	4	4		12	2
(Brazil) Mariany Nonaka	7	4	3	1	9	4
(Macau) Cheng I Cheong	6	4	2	2	6	10
(Macau) Chao In Ma	5	4	1	3	7	10
(Portugal) Teresa Pereira	4	4		4	4	12

=== Brackets ===
Quarter Final
(Brazil) Ligia Silva
(Brazil) Mariany Nonaka	4
(Macau) Tam Sut Fei	0
(Portugal) Leila Oliveira	4
(Macau) Cheng I Cheong	2
(Brazil) Karin Sako

Semi Final
(Brazil) Ligia Silva	2
(Brazil) Mariany Nonaka	4
(Portugal) Leila Oliveira	1
(Brazil) Karin Sako	4

Final
(Brazil) Mariany Nonaka	4
(Brazil) Karin Sako	1

== Male Doubles ==
=== Brackets ===
Preliminar
(Portugal) Oliveira / da Silva	4
(Timor-Leste) da Silva / Xavier	0

First Round
(Brazil) Mancini / Kojima	1
(Portugal) Oliveira / da Silva	4
(India) Ghantker / Noronha	0
(Macau) Leong / Vong	4
(Portugal) dos Santos / Efimov	4
(India) Pinto / Sawkar	0
(Brazil) Requejo / Manhani	3
(Macau) Chan / Iam	4

Semi Round
(Portugal) Oliveira / da Silva	4
(Macau) Leong / Vong	2
(Portugal) dos Santos / Efimov	4
(Macau) Chan / Iam	0

Final
(Portugal) Oliveira / da Silva	3
(Portugal) dos Santos / Efimov	4

== Female Doubles ==
=== Brackets ===
First Round
(Brazil) Silva / Nonaka
bye
(Portugal) Pereira / Nogueira	2
(Macau) Tam / Wong	4
(Portugal) Torres / Oliveira	3
(Macau) Cheong / Chan	4
bye
(Brazil) Sako / Yamada

Semi Final
(Brazil) Silva / Nonaka	4
(Macau) Tam / Wong	0
(Macau) Cheong / Chan	1
(Brazil) Sako / Yamada	4

Final
(Brazil) Silva / Nonaka	4
(Brazil) Sako / Yamada	1

== Mixed doubles ==
=== Brackets ===
First Round
(Macau) Leong / Ma
bye
(Brazil) Requejo / Kock	4
(Portugal) Pinho / Nogueira	1
(Brazil) Kojima / Silva	4
(Macau) Cheong / Wong	1
(Timor-Leste) da Silva / Fernande	0
(Portugal) da Silva / Oliveira	4

Semi Final
(Macau) Leong / Ma	3
(Brazil) Requejo / Kock	4
(Brazil) Kojima / Silva	4
(Portugal) da Silva / Oliveira	2

Final
(Brazil) Requejo / Kock	0
(Brazil) Kojima / Silva	4

== See also ==
- ACOLOP
- Lusophony Games
- 2006 Lusophony Games
