= India at the Lusofonia Games =

- IOC code: IND
- Medals Ranked 3rd: Gold 38 Silver 29 Bronze 35 Total 102

Lusofonia Games appearances (overview)
- 2006; 2009; 2014

India has participated in Lusofonia Games since inaugural Games of 2006. India is an associate member of ACOLOP, the governing body of the games.

== Medal table ==
Edition	(gold) Gold	(silver) Silver	(bronze) Bronze	Total	Position
2006 Macau	0	1	2	3	8th
2009 Lisbon	1	1	5	7	5th
2014 Goa	37	27	28	92	1st
Total	38	29	35	102	3rd

== Medals by sport ==
	Sport	1st place, gold medalist(s)	2nd place, silver medalist(s)	3rd place, bronze medalist(s)	Total
1	Athletics	15	14	9	38
2	Basketball	1	0	1	2
3	Beach volleyball	0	0	0	0
4	Football	1	0	0	1
5	Futsal	0	0	0	0
6	Judo	2	2	4	8
7	Table tennis	6	2	3	11
8	Taekwondo	2	3	11	16
9	Volleyball	2	0	2	4
10	Wushu	9	8	5	22
	Total	38	29	35	102

== See also ==
- India at the Olympics
- India at the Deaflympics
- India at the Paralympics
- India at the Youth Olympics
- India at the World Games
- India at the Asian Games
- India at the Asian Para Games
- India at the Asian Youth Games
- India at the Commonwealth Games
- India at the South Asian Games
