= Nuno Coelho (footballer, born 1987) =

Portuguese footballer

Personal information
- Full name: Nuno Miguel Prata Coelho
- Date of birth: 23 November 1987 (age 38)
- Place of birth: Covilhã, Portugal
- Height: 1.83 m (6 ft 0 in)
- Positions: Defensive midfielder; centre-back

Youth career
- 2000–2004: Covilhã

Senior career*
Years	Team	Apps	(Gls)
2004–2005	Covilhã	21	(0)
2005–2006	Porto B	31	(1)
2006–2009	Porto	0	(0)
2006	→ União Leiria (loan)	1	(0)
2007–2009	→ Portimonense (loan)	67	(0)
2009–2011	Académica	45	(0)
2011–2013	Benfica	0	(0)
2011–2012	→ Beira-Mar (loan)	23	(0)
2012–2013	→ Aris (loan)	25	(2)
2013–2018	Arouca	149	(10)
2018–2020	B-SAD	56	(1)
2020–2022	Chaves	53	(3)
Total		471	(17)

International career
2006–2007	Portugal U20	14	(1)
2007–2008	Portugal U21	4	(0)
- * Club domestic league appearances and goals

Nuno Miguel Prata Coelho (born 23 November 1987) is a Portuguese former professional footballer who played mainly as a defensive midfielder but also as a central defender.

== Club career ==
Born in Covilhã, Coelho moved from hometown club S.C. Covilhã to FC Porto in 2005 to complete his development although he had already appeared for the former's first team, and went on to serve three loans in the following three seasons, including two and a half years at Segunda Liga side Portimonense SC, where he played alongside namesake Nuno André Coelho.

Coelho was again loaned by Porto in July 2009, moving to Villarreal CF in Spain. The deal eventually broke, however, and he stayed in Portugal by signing a two-year contract with Académica de Coimbra.

On 9 June 2011, after being regularly used over two Primeira Liga campaigns by the Students, Coelho agreed to a four-year deal at S.L. Benfica. In August, deemed surplus to requirements by manager Jorge Jesus, he was loaned to S.C. Beira-Mar, joining Super League Greece side Aris Thessaloniki F.C. in 2012 on yet another loan.

In the summer of 2013, Coelho was released by the Lisbon-based club and moved to F.C. Arouca, recently promoted to the top flight. He went on to be their first-choice holding midfielder for several years, as well as team captain.

== International career ==
Coelho was capped for Portugal at under-19 level, appearing for the nation at the 2006 UEFA European Championship and the 2006 Lusofonia Games. The following year, he was picked for the squad that competed in the FIFA U-20 World Cup in Canada.
