= Pedro Mabale =

Equatoguinean politician, former football manager and player

Personal information
- Full name: Pedro Mabale Fuga Afang
- Date of birth: 1 January 1954 (age 72)
- Place of birth: Equatorial Guinea

Senior career*
Years	Team	Apps	(Gls)
- ? (Spain)

Managerial career
- 199x–1998: Equatorial Guinea
- Equatorial Guinea (women)
- * Club domestic league appearances and goals

Pedro Mabale Fuga Afang (born 1 January 1954) is an Equatorial Guinean politician and a retired football player and manager. He has been Secretary of State for Youth and Sports of Equatorial Guinea, Equatorial Guinea Olympic Committee General Secretary, Professor of Physical Education in several Centres and Colleges, Ministerial Sports Advisor.

== Career ==
Mabale was a football player in Spain (National and University level).

Mabale works as national coach for football, basketball, volleyball and athletics teams.

Until 1998 Mabale coached the Equatorial Guinea national football team.

Also Mabale was a head coach of the Equatorial Guinea women's national football team.

In January 2001, Mabale was elected General Secretary of the Equatorial Guinea Olympic Committee. Later he was re-elected in 2005, 2009, and 2013.
