= Eder Silva =

Brazilian footballer (born 1983)

Personal information
- Full name: Eder Silva Ferreira
- Date of birth: April 7, 1983 (age 43)
- Place of birth: Brazil
- Height: 1.74 m (5 ft 8 1/2 in)
- Position: Midfielder

Senior career*
Years	Team	Apps	(Gls)
2010	Vitória da Conquista		
2010–2013	Bragantino		
2013	Novo Hamburgo		
2013	Vitória da Conquista		
2014	Shonan Bellmare		
2015	Guarani		
2016–	Atibaia		
- * Club domestic league appearances and goals

Eder Silva Ferreira (born April 7, 1983) is a Brazilian football player.
