= 2006 Lusofonia Games =

I Lusofonia Games
- Host: Macau, China
- Motto: 4 Continents, 1 Language, United by sport!
- Nations: 11
- Athletes: 733
- Events: 48 in 8 sports
- Opening: 7 October 2006
- Closing: 15 October 2006
- Opened by: Edmund Ho
- Closed by: Fernando Chui
- Main venue: Macau Stadium

The 2006 Lusofonia Games (Portuguese: 1.^{os} Jogos da Lusofonia; Chinese: 第一屆葡語系運動會) were held in the Macau Special Administrative Region of the People's Republic of China between 7 and 15 October 2006. The 2006 Games were the first edition of this multi-sport event for Portuguese-speaking countries and territories, under the banner of ACOLOP.

The site for the opening ceremony was the Macau Stadium and the closing ceremony was held at the Macau East Asian Games Dome. The mascot for the games was a dog named Leo. The pronunciation of "Leo" in Portuguese is similar to Chinese (嚟澳; Lei O) and it means "Come to Macau".

Due to the high expenses, some of the participating NOCs received financial support from the International Olympic Committee and Olympic Committee of Portugal.

== Sports ==
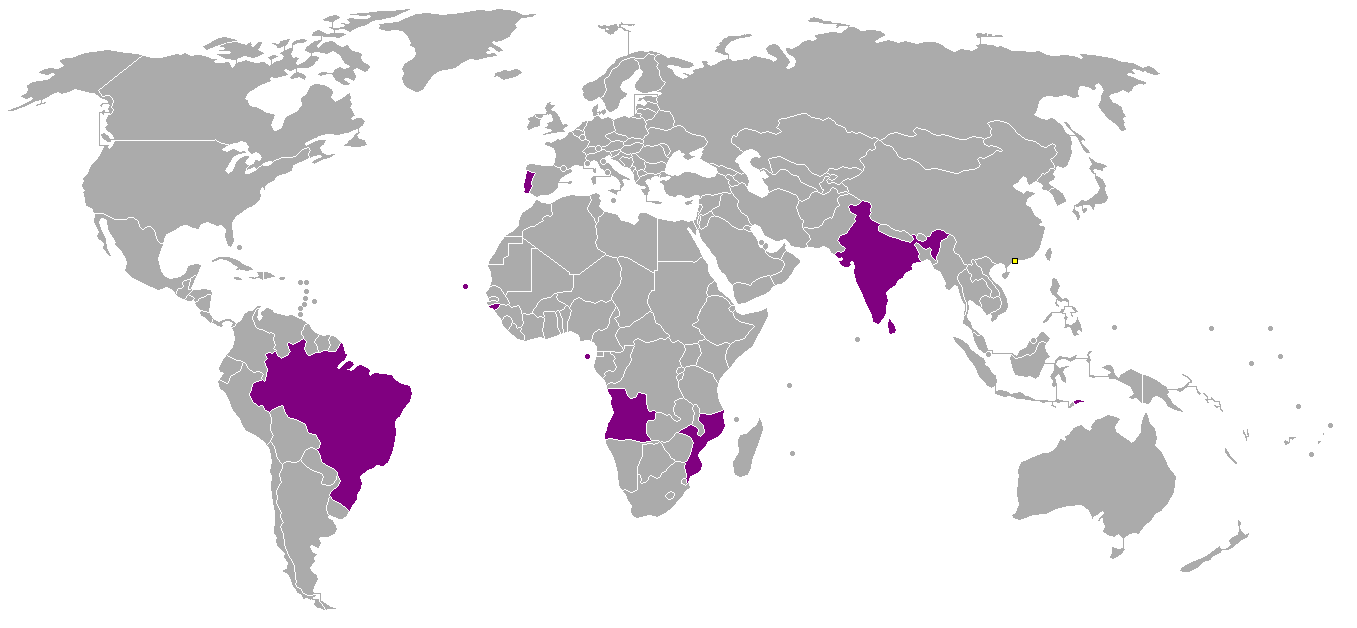
Participating countries (purple) and host city (yellow square) of the 1st Lusophone Games.

The 2006 Lusophone Games included 8 sports, 3 individual sports and 5 team sports. In total there were 48 events at the Games.

- Athletics
- Basketball
- Football (men)
- Futsal (men)
- Taekwondo (men)
- Table tennis
- Volleyball
- Beach volleyball

== Delegations ==
A total of 733 athletes competed at the Games.

Nations	Number of athletes	Male								Female
		Athletics	Basketball	Football (soccer)	Futsal	Taekwondo	Table tennis	Volleyball	Beach volleyball	Athletics	Basketball	Table tennis	Volleyball	Beach volleyball
Angola	58	X	X	X	X	X			X	X				X
Brazil	74	X			X	X	X		X	X		X		X
Cape Verde	54	X	X	X		X			X	X	X			X
Guinea-Bissau	39	X	X	X					X	X				X
Macau	155	X	X	X	X	X	X	X	X	X	X	X	X	X
Mozambique	46	X		X						X	X			X
Portugal	140	X	X	X	X	X	X	X	X	X	X	X	X	X
São Tomé and Príncipe	32	X		X		X			X	X
(Timor-Leste); East Timor	57	X	X	X	X	X	X		X	X		X	X
India	42			X		X	X	X	X	X				X
Sri Lanka	12	X							X	X

- When the Games started Equatorial Guinea didn't field any athletes.

== Medal table ==
Host nation (Macau)

2006 Lusophony Games medal count					
Pos	Country	1st place, gold medalist(s)	2nd place, silver medalist(s)	3rd place, bronze medalist(s)	Total
1	Brazil	29	19	9	57
2	Portugal	12	18	21	51
3	Sri Lanka	3	2	1	6
4	Mozambique	3	0	3	6
5	Cape Verde	1	1	4	6
6	Macau	0	3	11	14
7	Angola	0	3	2	5
8	India	0	1	2	3
8	São Tomé and Príncipe	0	1	2	3
10	(Timor-Leste) East Timor	0	0	1	1
10	Guinea-Bissau	0	0	1	1
Total		48	48	57	153

== Calendar ==
●	Opening ceremony	●	Event competitions	●	Event finals	●	Closing ceremony

October	4th	5th	6th	7th	8th	9th	10th	11th	12th	13th	14th	15th
Ceremonies				●								●
Athletics								●	●			
Basketball					●	●	●	●	●	●	●	●
Beach volleyball										●	●	●
Football	●	●	●		●		●					
Futsal						●	●	●		●	●	
Taekwondo					●	●						
Table tennis						●	●	●				
Volleyball				●	●	●		●				
October	4th	5th	6th	7th	8th	9th	10th	11th	12th	13th	14th	15th

== Venues ==
- IPM Multisport Pavilion (Pavilhão Polidesportivo do IPM)
- Tap Seac Multi-sports Pavilion (Pavilhão Polidesportivo Tap Seac)
- Macau Stadium Pavilion (Pavilhão Desportivo do Estádio de Macau)
- Macau Stadium (Estádio de Macau)
- Sports Field and Pavilion at MUST (Campo Desportivo e Pavilhão da UCTM)
- Macau East Asian Games Dome (Nave Desportiva dos Jogos da Ásia Oriental de Macau)
- Tennis Academy (Academia de Ténis)

== See also ==
- ACOLOP
- Lusophone Games
- 2009 Lusophone Games
- 2014 Lusophone Games
