= Portugal at the Lusofonia Games =

Brazil has participated in all the Lusophone Games since the beginning in 2006. Brazil is the first in the all time medal table.

== Medal tables ==
=== By championships ===
Host nation

Year	Gold	Silver	Bronze	Total	Rank
2006 Macau	12	18	21	51	2
(Portugal) 2009 Lisbon	25	34	15	74	2
(India) 2014 Goa	18	20	12	50	2
(Brazil) 2024 Goiânia					
Total	55	72	48	175	2

=== By sports ===
Pos	Sport	Gold	Silver	Bronze	Total
1	Athletics	21	30	22	73
2	Table tennis	4	4	4	12
3	Volleyball	4	0	0	4
4	Judo	2	9	3	14
5	Taekwondo	2	2	4	8
6	Basketball	2	1	1	4
7	Beach volleyball	1	2	2	5
8	Football	1	1	0	2
9	Futsal	0	2	0	2
10	Disabled athletics	0	1	0	1
	Total	37	52	36	125
