= Beach volleyball at the Lusofonia Games =

Lusophone Games, 2006, Beach Volleyball

Beach Volleyball at the Lusophone Games was first held in the first edition in Macau, in 2006.

== Men's tournament ==
- 2009: Portugal/José Pedrosa-Hugo Gaspar
- 2006: Brazil/Maciel-Costa

== Women's tournament ==
- 2009: Brazil saldanha/Maestrini
- 2006: Brazil Saldanha/Maestrini
