= Table tennis at the Lusofonia Games =

The Table tennis tournament is held since 2006.

== Winners ==
=== Men's singles ===
- 2014: India Harmeet Desai
- 2009: Portugal Andre Silva
- 2006: Portugal Ricardo Oliveira

=== Women's singles ===
- 2014: India Kumaresan Shamini
- 2009: Brazil Ligia Silvia
- 2006: Brazil Mariany Nonaka

=== Men's doubles ===
- 2014: Portugal Silva/Silva
- 2009: Portugal
- 2006: Portugal dos Santos/Efimov

=== Women's doubles ===
- 2014: India Patkar/Shamini
- 2009: Brazil
- 2006: Brazil Silvia/Nonaka

=== Mixed doubles ===
- 2014: India Ghosh/Das
- 2006: Brazil Kojima/Silvia

=== Men's team ===
- 2014: India

=== Women's team ===
- 2014: India
