= São Tomé and Príncipe at the Lusofonia Games =

Overall performance of São Tomé and Príncipe in the Lusophone Games. The country won 1 silver medals at the 2014 Lusofonia Games.

== Medal table by sports ==
Pos	Sport	Gold	Silver	Bronze	Total
1	Taekwondo	1	2	5	8
2	Athletics	0	1	2	3
	Total	1	3	7	11

== Participation by year ==
- 2006
- 2009
- 2014
