= 2014 Lusofonia Games =

3rd edition of sport event of Portuguese-speaking nations

III Lusofonia Games
- Host city: Goa, India
- Nations: 12
- Athletes: 7,000
- Events: 95 in 9 sports
- Opening: 18 January 2014
- Closing: 29 January 2014
- Opened by: Pranab Mukherjee
- Main venue: Fatorda Stadium
- Website: Goa 2014

The 2014 Lusofonia Games was the third edition of the Lusofonia Games, a multi-sport event held between athletes from Portuguese-speaking countries and territories. It was held from 18 to 29 January 2014 in the Indian state of Goa.

Brazil and Sri Lanka also put in bids to stage the event. Participating delegations represented every Portuguese-speaking National Olympic Committee and other countries with historic ties to Portugal. The Chairman for these Games was Manohar Parrikar, the chief minister of Goa and the Chief Executive Officer was Keshav Chandra IAS, Secretary to the Government of Goa for Sports and Education. The Games were originally planned to be held in 2013, but was postponed and moved to the January 2014 dates.

Since Goa was elected to host the games, Brazil chose not to send their athletes because of the "huge postponement" of the competition. Only seven Brazilian athletes, attending independently of the Brazilian Olympic Committee, competed at the 2014 Lusophone Games.

== Participating countries ==
All ACOLOP member and associated member countries were expected to participate in these Games:

Members

- Angola
- Brazil
- Cape Verde
- Guinea-Bissau
- Macau, China
- Mozambique
- Portugal
- São Tomé and Príncipe
- Timor-Leste

Associate members

- Equatorial Guinea
- India
- Sri Lanka

== Venues ==
List of 2014 Lusophone Games Venues

Venue	City	Capacity	Sports	Ref
Fatorda Stadium	Margão	22,000	Football	
GMC Athletic Stadium	Bambolim	3,600	Athletics	
Dr Shyama Prasad Mukherjee Indoor Stadium	Bambolim	4,000	Basketball & Volleyball	
Tilak Maidan Stadium	Vasco da Gama	5,000	Football	
Multipurpose Indoor Stadium	Peddem	2,000	Judo, Taekwondo, Table Tennis & Wushu	
Miramar Beach	Panaji	1,900	Beach Volleyball	

== Sports ==
Jojo, the official mascot of the Games

For these Games, 97 events in 9 sports, were contested for medals. Wushu made its debut. The majority of the sports here were contested at the first Lusophone Games in 2006, with the exception of judo, which made its debut in 2009. However, futsal was dropped from these Games, after being contested in both 2006 and 2009.

- Athletics (31)
- Basketball (2)
- Beach volleyball (2)
- Football (1)
- Judo (14)
- Table tennis (7)
- Taekwondo (8)
- Volleyball (2)
- Wushu (30)

== Calendar ==
Opening ceremony	Event competitions	Event finals	Closing ceremony

January 2014	18th Sat	19th Sun	20th Mon	21st Tue	22nd Wed	23rd Thu	24th Fri	25th Sat	26th Sun	27th Mon	28th Tue	29th Wed	Gold medals
Athletics								29		2			31
Basketball										2			2
Beach volleyball									2				2
Football											1		1
Judo							14						14
Table tennis			2		2	3							7
Taekwondo									8				8
Volleyball				2									2
Wushu												30	30
Total gold medals													97
Cumulative Total													97
Ceremonies													
January 2014	18th Sat	19th Sun	20th Mon	21st Tue	22nd Wed	23rd Thu	24th Fri	25th Sat	26th Sun	27th Mon	28th Tue	29th Wed	Gold medals

== Medal table ==
* Host nation (India)

Rank	Nation	Gold	Silver	Bronze	Total
1	India (IND)*	37	27	28	92
2	Portugal (POR)	18	20	12	50
3	Macau (MAC)	15	9	14	38
4	Sri Lanka (SRI)	7	11	13	31
5	Angola (ANG)	5	8	14	27
6	Mozambique (MOZ)	4	4	5	13
7	Brazil (BRA)	2	1	3	6
8	Guinea-Bissau (GNB)	2	1	0	3
9	Cape Verde (CPV)	1	6	5	12
10	São Tomé and Príncipe (STP)	0	1	0	1
11	Timor-Leste (TLS)	0	0	1	1
Totals (11 entries)		91	88	95	274

== Criticism ==
The organizers of the Games were criticized by political parties over corruption. Indian National Congress spokesperson Durgadas Kamat alleged a ₹100 crore scam in the pricing of the Games' medals, grand opening and closing ceremonies, hiring of taxis, as well as in laying out infrastructure.

== See also ==
- ACOLOP
- CPLP Games
- Commonwealth Games
- Jeux de la Francophonie
