= Macau at the Lusofonia Games =

Overall performance of Macau in the Lusophone Games.

== Medal table by sports ==
Pos	Sport	Gold	Silver	Bronze	Total
1	Wushu	11	5	2	18
2	Taekwondo	4	1	5	10
3	Athletics	1	0	10	11
4	Volleyball	0	5	1	6
5	Judo	0	4	6	10
6	Table tennis	0	0	9	9
	Total	16	15	32	64

== Participation by year ==
- 2006
- 2009
- 2014
