= ACOLOP =

Associação dos Comités Olímpicos de Língua Oficial Portuguesa
- Formation: 2004; 22 years ago
- Type: Sports federation
- Headquarters: Praia, Cabo Verde
- Members: 9 CPLP members 3 Associate members
- Official language: Portuguese
- Website: https://acolop.net/

ACOLOP (acronym for Associação dos Comités Olímpicos de Língua Oficial Portuguesa; English: Association of the Portuguese Speaking Olympic Committees) is an Olympic-related non-profit organization officially established on 8 June 2004, in Lisbon and has been approved by the International Olympic Committee. It was founded by the national Olympic committees (NOCs) of Angola, Brazil, Cape Verde, Guinea-Bissau, Macau (Chinese SAR), Mozambique, Portugal, São Tomé and Príncipe and Timor-Leste; it also includes Equatorial Guinea as an associate member. In April 2006, India (represented by the Goa Olympic Association) and Sri Lanka were admitted also as associate members, based on their common historical past with Portugal.

The Portuguese-speaking countries are spread through four continents and reach a total population of about 250 million people. Portuguese thus occupies a place among the most spoken languages in the world. The purpose of reinforcing the bonds between these nations and promoting unity and cooperation through sport was the main reason for ACOLOP's creation.

== Goals and projects ==
The goals which guide this organisation are:

- The spreading of the Olympic ideals on every member country and territory;
- Equality, mutual respect and interest convergence-based cooperation between every member country and territory;
- Cooperation of every member country and territory on the definition of objectives, data exchange and common interests defense;
- Development of Olympic solidarity programs with the International Olympic Committee (IOC) support;
- Cooperation on an Olympic Games mission-chief level;
- Joint-bids for places on the International Olympic Movement structure;
- Staging of the ACOLOP Games (Lusophony Games).

At the 8th general assembly, in Macau (February 2, 2007), the president Manuel Silvério stated the intention of campaigning for the elevation of Portuguese language to official status inside the IOC and Association of National Olympic Committees of Africa (ANOCA) structures. On the agenda is also the creation of a "Lusophone Olympic Academy", institution of an "International Lusophony Day", promotion of an annual football tournament and also an annual sporting awards gala.

On June 8, 2007, precisely three years after the creation of the ACOLOP, the organization's new official portal was launched. Its servers are located on the organization's headquarters in Macau. This portal was established with the purpose of strengthening the communication between the Lusophone world and the ACOLOP. It serves also as a platform to display all news and activities concerning all member associations, especially those that do not have a portal.

== Members ==
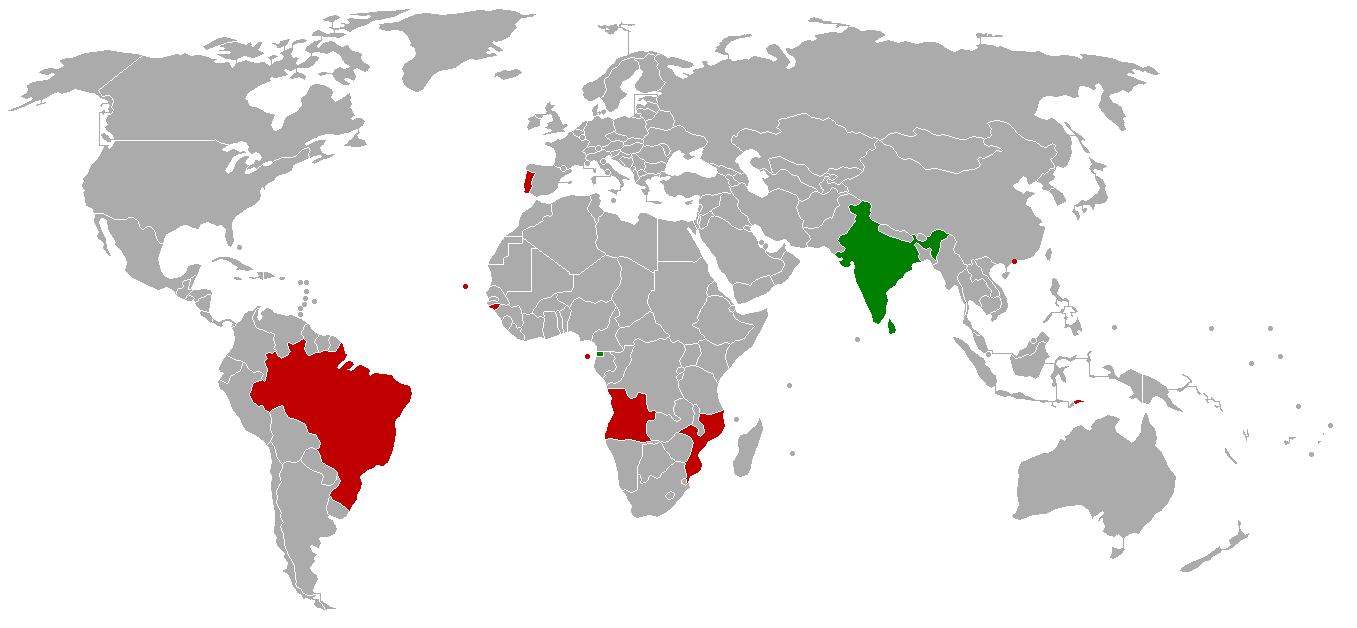
Founding (red) and associate (green) members of the ACOLOP.

=== Founding members ===
- Angola
- Brazil
- Cape Verde
- Guinea-Bissau
- Macau, China
- Mozambique
- Portugal
- São Tomé and Príncipe
- Timor-Leste

=== Associate members ===
- Equatorial Guinea
- India
- Sri Lanka

== Organization structure ==
From January 1, 2007, to December 31, 2009, a new board will be led by Manuel Silvério, as a result of elections carried on October 12, 2006. This board's official inauguration took place in Macau, on 4 February 2007, site of the ACOLOP's headquarters. As José Vicente de Moura, is the 2009 Lusophony Games organizing committee president and the vice-president (coming from the Olympic Committee of Portugal) is Manuel Marques da Silva.

ACOLOP boards

2004–2006

Executive Committee
President

- José Vicente de Moura (Portugal Olympic Committee president)

Vice-president

- Manuel Silvério (Macau Olympic Committee 1st vice-president)

General Secretary

- Rogério Torres Cerveira Nunes da Silva (Angolan Olympic Committee president)

Treasurer

- Francisco Costa (Guinea-Bissau Olympic Committee vice-president)

Statutory Audit committee
President

- João Manuel da Costa Alegre Afonso (São Tomé and Príncipe Olympic Committee president)

Other members

- Marcelino Macomé (Mozambique Olympic Committee president)
- João Viegas Carrascalão (Timor-Leste Olympic Committee president)

General Assembly

- Carlos Arthur Nuzman (Brazilian Olympic Committee president)
- André Gustavo Richer (Brazilian Olympic Committee general-secretary)
- Mário Rosa R. de Almeida (Angolan Olympic Committee general-secretary)
- Augusto Bernardo Viegas (Guinea-Bissau Olympic Committee president)
- Sérgio Mané (Guinea-Bissau Olympic Committee general-secretary)
- António Menezes da Trindade (São Tomé and Príncipe Olympic Committee general-secretary)
- Penalva César (Mozambique Olympic Committee general-secretary)
- Joanico Gonçalves (Timor-Leste Olympic Committee general-secretary)
- Antero Barros (Cape Verde Olympic Committee president)
- Felisberto Cardoso (Cape Verde Olympic Committee general-secretary)
- Melchor Okue Motto (Equatorial-Guinea Olympic Committee president)
- Pedro Mabale (Equatorial-Guinea Olympic Committee general-secretary)

2007–2009

Executive Committee
President

- Manuel Silvério (Macau Olympic Committee 1st vice-president)

1st Vice-president

- Manuel Marques da Silva (Portugal Olympic Committee)

2nd Vice-president

- Carlos Arthur Nuzman (Brazilian Olympic Committee president)

3rd Vice-president

- Hemasiri Fernando (Sri Lanka Olympic Committee)

General Secretary

- Gustavo da Conceição (Angolan Olympic Committee)

Assistant General Secretary

- João Manuel da Costa Alegre Afonso (São Tomé and Príncipe Olympic Committee president)

Treasurer

- Augusto Bernardo Viegas (Guinea-Bissau Olympic Committee president)

Executive Director

- Vasco Bismark (Macau Olympic Committee)

Statutory Audit Committee
President

- João Viegas Carrascalão (Timor-Leste Olympic Committee president)

Other members

- Marcelino Macomé (Mozambique Olympic Committee president)
- Franklin da Palma (Cape Verde Olympic Committee)

== See also ==
- Lusofonia Games
- Lusofonia Youth Games
- Lusofonia Beach Games
- Lusofonia Para Games
- CPLP Games
- Macau 2006 Lusofonia Games
- Lisbon 2009 Lusofonia Games
- Goa 2014 Lusofonia Games
