= September 2006 in sports =

<<	September 2006					>>
Su	Mo	Tu	We	Th	Fr	Sa
					1	2
3	4	5	6	7	8	9
10	11	12	13	14	15	16
17	18	19	20	21	22	23
24	25	26	27	28	29	30
India; Sports

This list shows notable sports-related deaths, events, and notable outcomes that occurred in September of 2006.

== Deaths ==
- 29: Walter Hadlee
- 26: Byron Nelson
- 18: Syd Thrift
- 10: Patty Berg
- 8: Peter Brock
- 1: Bob Mathias

== Sporting seasons ==
- Auto racing 2006:
  - Formula One; GP2; BTCC
  - D1 Grand Prix
  - Indy Racing League
  - NASCAR; 2006 Chase for the NEXTEL Cup; Busch; Craftsman Truck
  - World Rally Championship
  - American Le Mans Series
  - Le Mans Series
- Basketball:
  - 2006 college basketball season in the Philippines – UAAP Season 69, NCAA Season 82
- Cricket 2006: England
- Football 2006–07:
  - 2006–07 UEFA Champions League
  - 2006–07 UEFA Cup
- Rugby union 2006:
  - 2006 Air New Zealand Cup
  - 2006 Currie Cup
  - 2006–07 English Premiership
  - 2006–07 Top 14
  - 2006–07 Celtic League
  - 2007 Rugby World Cup qualifying
- Volleyball 2006:
  - Men's CEV Champions League 2006–07
- U.S. and Canadian sports 2005–06:
  - 2006 MLB season
  - 2006 CFL season
  - 2006 US college football season
  - 2006 NFL season

== 30 September 2006 (Saturday) ==
- 2006 Australian Football League Finals Series – Toyota AFL Grand Final at the Melbourne Cricket Ground
  - West Coast Eagles 12.13 (85), Sydney Swans 12.12 (84)
- Major League Baseball:
  - American League playoff races:
    - Chicago White Sox 6, Minnesota Twins 3
    - Kansas City Royals 9, Detroit Tigers 6: The Tigers fail to clinch the Central.
  - National League playoff races:
    - Philadelphia Phillies 4, Florida Marlins 3: The Phillies win, but are eliminated from the wild-card race later in the day as a result of victories by both the Dodgers and Padres.
    - St. Louis Cardinals 3, Milwaukee Brewers 2
    - Los Angeles Dodgers 4, San Francisco Giants 2: The Dodgers have clinched a playoff berth.
    - San Diego Padres 3, Arizona Diamondbacks 1: The Padres have clinched a playoff berth.
    - Houston Astros 5, Atlanta Braves 4: The Astros remain 1½ games behind the Cards.
    - Pittsburgh Pirates 3, Cincinnati Reds 0: The Reds are eliminated from the Central race before their game starts as a result of the Cardinals win earlier in the day.
  - Non-playoff news:
    - The Los Angeles Times has reported that Jason Grimsley, a former pitcher for several MLB teams who has been accused of supplying performance-enhancing drugs to several players, allegedly named stars Roger Clemens, Andy Pettitte, and Miguel Tejada in a sworn statement as users of performance-enhancers. (LA Times)
    - The Washington Nationals announce that Frank Robinson will not return as manager for the 2007 season. (ESPN)
    - New York Mets ace Pedro Martínez will now be out until at least June 2007 after an MRI discovered a torn rotator cuff in his right (throwing) shoulder that will require surgery. (ESPN)
- American football:
  - NCAA Division I-A Top 25:
    - (1) Ohio State 38, (13) Iowa 17
    - (3) Southern California 28, Washington State 22
    - (5) Florida 28, Alabama 13
    - (6) Michigan 28, Minnesota 14
    - (7) Texas 56, Sam Houston 3
    - (9) LSU 48, Mississippi State 17
    - (10) Georgia 14, Ole Miss 9
    - (24) Georgia Tech 38, (11) Virginia Tech 27
    - (12) Notre Dame 35, Purdue 21
    - (14) Oregon 48, Arizona State 13
    - (15) Tennessee 41, Memphis 7
    - (18) Clemson 51, Louisiana Tech 0
    - (20) Cal 41, Oregon State 13
    - (21) Nebraska 39, Kansas 32 (OT)
    - (22) Boise State 36, Utah 3
    - (25) Missouri 28, Colorado 13: Mizzou goes 5–0, their best start since 1981, while the Buffaloes lose their ninth straight, their worst streak in over 40 years.
  - Other significant games:
    - SMU 33, Tulane 28: The Mustangs spoil the Green Wave's first game in New Orleans since Hurricane Katrina.
- Basketball: University Athletics Association of the Philippines 69th basketball tournament – Championship round (Philippine Daily Inquirer):
  - Men's Finals: (3) UST Growling Tigers 87, (1) Ateneo Blue Eagles 71 – UST held off an Ateneo rally at the middle of the first quarter and built a comfortable cushion to prevent the Eagles from catching up. Santo Tomas forces a deciding third game for the championship.
  - Women's Finals: (1) UST Tigresses 67, (2) FEU Lady Tamaraws 59 – the Tigresses win their 11th championship, and their first in 11 years.
  - Juniors' Finals: (1) Ateneo Blue Eaglets 69, (2) FEU-FERN Baby Tamaraws 61 – the Eaglets win their 15th championship as they repulsed the Baby Tamaraws in the deciding game.

== 29 September 2006 (Friday) ==
- Major League Baseball playoff races:
  - American League:
    - Kansas City Royals 9, Detroit Tigers 7 (11 innings)
    - Chicago White Sox 4, Minnesota Twins 3: The Twins and Tigers remain tied for the Central and wild card.
    - New York Yankees 7, Toronto Blue Jays 2: The Yankees' win, combined with the losses by Detroit and Minnesota, guarantees them home field advantage throughout the playoffs.
  - National League:
    - Atlanta Braves 4, Houston Astros 1
    - Philadelphia Phillies 14 Florida Marlins 2: The Phillies win to avoid elimination in the wild-card race.
    - Cincinnati Reds 5, Pittsburgh Pirates 2: The Reds win to keep their playoff hopes alive.
    - St. Louis Cardinals 10, Milwaukee Brewers 5: The Cards increase their lead to 1½ games.
    - Arizona Diamondbacks 3, San Diego Padres 1: A win by the Padres would have ensured a playoff berth, but they instead drop into a tie with the Dodgers.
    - Los Angeles Dodgers 4, San Francisco Giants 3: The Dodgers score two in the top of the ninth and hold on for the win.
- World Chess Championship
  - A dispute leads to Vladimir Kramnik refusing to play the 5th game. The game is awarded to Veselin Topalov. Kramnik now leads 3 – 2, but the future of the match is now in doubt.
- American football: NCAA Division I-A Top 25:
  - (23) Rutgers 22, South Florida 20: The Scarlet Knights' first stay in the national rankings since 1976 nearly ended here, as they had to overcome a halftime deficit and stop a Bulls two-point conversion attempt with 15 seconds left that would have tied the game.

== 28 September 2006 (Thursday) ==
- Cricket: Allegations of ball tampering against Pakistani cricket captain Inzamam-ul-Haq are dismissed during an ICC Code of Conduct hearing at the Oval in London. However, Inzamam was found guilty of having brought the game into disrepute and subsequently banned for four one day international matches. The allegations stem from an incident during the Fourth Test between Pakistan and England in August. (Cricinfo article)
- Major League Baseball playoff races:
  - American League:
    - Toronto Blue Jays 8, Detroit Tigers 6
    - Minnesota Twins 2, Kansas City Royals 1
      - Joe Mauer ties the game with a home run in the ninth inning, then Jason Bartlett singles home the winning run in the 10th. The Twins pull even with the Tigers in the AL Central.
  - National League:
    - Houston Astros 3, Pittsburgh Pirates 0: Houston is eliminated from wild-card contention, but still competes with St. Louis for the NL Central.
    - Los Angeles Dodgers 19, Colorado Rockies 11: Dodgers increase wild card lead to 2 games.
    - Cincinnati Reds 5, Florida Marlins 1: The Reds keep their slim playoff hopes alive.
    - Washington Nationals 3, Philadelphia Phillies 1: Game starts over 4 hours late in front of a near empty stadium as they try to get the game in with little opportunity to reschedule this late in the season.
    - Milwaukee Brewers 9, St. Louis Cardinals 4: The Cards' lead falls to ½ game over the Astros.
    - San Diego Padres 12, Arizona Diamondbacks 4: Padres maintain 1 game lead in the West.
    - The New York Mets announce that Pedro Martínez will miss the playoffs due to a calf injury. Yahoo! Sports
- American football: NCAA Division I-A Top 25:
  - (2) Auburn 24, South Carolina 17
  - BYU 31, (17) TCU 17: The Cougars end the Horned Frogs' 13-game winning streak, and most likely end the Frogs' hopes of "busting" the BCS.
- Association football: 2006–07 UEFA Cup, first round, second leg, progressing teams shown in **bold**.
  - **Hapoel Tel Aviv** 3 – 1 Chornomorets Odesa (aggregate: 4–1)
  - Chievo 2 – 1 **Sporting Braga** (aet) (agg.: 2–3)
  - **Newcastle United** 2 – 1 Levadia Tallinn (agg.: 3–1)
  - **Rangers** 2 – 0 Molde (agg.: 2–0)
  - **Celta Vigo** 3 – 0 Standard Liège (agg.: 4–0)
  - Litex Lovech 1 – 3 **Maccabi Haifa** (agg.: 2–4)
  - **Paris St-Germain** 2 – 0 Derry City (agg.: 2–0)
  - **Odense** 1 – 0 Hertha Berlin (agg.: 3–2)
  - **Austria Vienna** 1 – 0 Legia Warsaw (agg.: 2–1)
  - Metalurh Zaporizhzhya 0 – 1 **Panathinaikos** (agg.: 1–2)
  - **Zulte-Waregem** 2 – 0 Lokomotiv Moscow (agg.: 3–2)
  - **Sparta Prague** 0 – 0 Hearts (agg.: 2–0)
  - Randers 0 – 3 **Fenerbahçe** (agg.: 1–5)
  - **Blackburn Rovers** 2 – 0 Red Bull Salzburg (agg.: 4–2)
  - **Nancy** 3 – 1 Schalke 04 (agg.: 3–2)
  - **Lens** 3 – 1 Ethnikos Achna (agg.: 3–1)
  - Red Star Belgrade 1 – 2 **Slovan Liberec** (agg.: 1–4)
  - Kayserispor 1 – 1 **AZ Alkmaar** (agg.: 3–4)
  - **Parma** 1 – 0 Rubin Kazan (agg.: 2–0)
  - **Sevilla** 4 – 0 Atromitos (agg.: 6–1)
  - Brøndby 2 – 2 **Eintracht Frankfurt** (agg.: 2–6)
  - CSKA Sofia 2–2 **Beşiktaş** (aet) (agg.: 2–4)
  - **Heerenveen** 0 – 0 Vitória Setúbal (agg.: 3–0)
  - **Mladá Boleslav** 4 – 2 Marseille (agg.: 4–3)
  - **Grasshoppers** 5 – 0 Åtvidaberg (agg.: 8–0)
  - Nacional 1 – 2 **Rapid Bucharest** (aet) (agg.: 1–3)
  - **Osasuna** 0 – 0 Trabzonspor (agg.: 2–2 )
  - Rabotnički 0 – 1 **FC Basel** (agg.: 2–7)
  - **Palermo** 3 – 0 West Ham United (agg.: 4–0)
  - **Feyenoord** 0 – 0 Lokomotiv Sofia (agg.: 2–2 )
  - **Club Brugge** 1 – 1 Ružomberok (agg.: 2–1)
  - **Bayer Leverkusen** 3 – 1 FC Sion (agg.: 3–1)
  - Groningen 1 – 0 **FK Partizan** (agg.: 3–4)
  - **Dinamo Bucharest** 4 – 1 Skoda Xanthi (agg.: 8–4)
  - **Tottenham Hotspur** 1 – 0 Slavia Prague (agg.: 2–0)
  - **Ajax** 4 – 0 I.K. Start (agg.: 9–2)
  - **Espanyol** 3 – 1 Artmedia Bratislava (agg.: 5–3)
  - Iraklis 0 – 2 **Wisła Kraków** (aet) (agg.: 1–2 )
  - Pasching 0 – 1 **Livorno** (agg.: 0–3)
  - **Auxerre** 3 – 1 Dinamo Zagreb (agg.: 5–2)

== 27 September 2006 (Wednesday) ==
- World Chess Championship
  - A draw leaves Vladimir Kramnik with a 3 – 1 lead over Veselin Topalov
- Association football: 2006–07 UEFA Champions League, group stage, matchday 2
  - Group A: Levski Sofia 1 – 3 Chelsea
    - Didier Drogba scores all three of Chelsea's goals
  - Group A: Werder Bremen 1 – 1 Barcelona
  - Group B: Spartak Moscow 1 – 1 Sporting
  - Group B: Internazionale 0 – 2 Bayern Munich
  - Group C: Liverpool 3 – 2 Galatasaray
  - Group C: Bordeaux 0 – 1 PSV
  - Group D: Shakhtar Donetsk 2 – 2 Olympiakos
  - Group D: Valencia 2 – 1 Roma
- National Football League
  - Dallas Cowboys wide receiver Terrell Owens denies a Dallas police report that he tried to commit suicide Tuesday night. Owens says his hospitalization was due to an allergic reaction to the pain-reliever hydrocodone. (ESPN) (FOX Sports) (AP via Yahoo)
- Major League Baseball playoff races:
  - American League:
    - Toronto Blue Jays 7, Detroit Tigers 4
    - Kansas City Royals 6, Minnesota Twins 4: The Twins remain a game behind the Tigers in the AL Central.
  - National League:
    - Florida Marlins 7, Cincinnati Reds 2: The Reds are eliminated from the wild card race, but still are in contention in the NL Central.
    - Houston Astros 7 Pittsburgh Pirates 6 (15 innings)
    - Philadelphia Phillies 8, Washington Nationals 7 (14 innings)
    - St. Louis Cardinals 4, San Diego Padres 2: Cardinals snap 7-game losing streak, maintaining 1½ game lead over Astros in the Central. Padres lead over Dodgers reduced to one game in the West.
    - Los Angeles Dodgers 6, Colorado Rockies 4: Dodgers maintain 1-game lead over the Phillies for the wild card.

== 26 September 2006 (Tuesday) ==
- World Chess Championship
  - A draw leaves Vladimir Kramnik with a 2½ – ½ lead over Veselin Topalov
- Association football: 2006–07 UEFA Champions League, group stage, matchday 2
  - Group E: Real Madrid 5 – 1 Dynamo Kyiv
    - Ruud van Nistelrooy and Raúl each score two goals for Real.
  - Group E: Steaua Bucharest 0 – 3 Lyon
  - Group F: Benfica 0 – 1 Manchester United
  - Group F: Celtic 1 – 0 Copenhagen
  - Group G: CSKA Moscow 1 – 0 Hamburg
  - Group G: Arsenal 2 – 0 FC Porto
  - Group H: AEK 1 – 1 Anderlecht
  - Group H: Lille 0 – 0 Milan
- Major League Baseball playoff races:
  - American League:
    - Detroit Tigers 4, Toronto Blue Jays 3
    - Minnesota Twins 3, Kansas City Royals 2: The Twins stay a game behind the Tigers in the AL Central.
    - Texas Rangers 5, |Los Angeles Angels 2
    - Oakland Athletics 12, Seattle Mariners 3: The A's clinch the AL West. The AL playoff teams are now determined, with the Tigers and Twins still battling for the AL Central crown.
  - National League:
    - San Diego Padres 7, St. Louis Cardinals 5: In this matchup between the leaders of the NL West and Central, the Padres maintain their two-game lead over the Dodgers while sending the Redbirds to their seventh straight loss.
    - Houston Astros 7, Pittsburgh Pirates 4: The Astros meanwhile win their seventh straight, closing to within 1½ games of the Cardinals.
    - Cincinnati Reds 5, Florida Marlins 3: Florida is mathematically eliminated from the NL wild card race, while the Reds stay 1 game behind the Astros.
    - Washington Nationals 4, Philadelphia Phillies 3
    - Los Angeles Dodgers 11, Colorado Rockies 4: The Dodgers take a one-game lead over Philly for the NL wild card. Greg Maddux throws only 76 pitches in six innings of work, prompting Dodgers manager Grady Little to announce that Maddux can start if needed against the San Francisco Giants in their season-closing weekend series.

== 25 September 2006 (Monday) ==
- Major League Baseball playoff races:
  - American League:
    - Cleveland Indians 14, Chicago White Sox 1: The defending World Series champs are eliminated, assuring Major League Baseball of a new champion for the sixth year in a row.
    - Minnesota Twins 8, Kansas City Royals 1: The win, plus the White Sox loss, punches the Twins' playoff ticket. They are now 1 game behind the idle Detroit Tigers in the AL Central.
    - |Los Angeles Angels 8, Texas Rangers 3: The Angels stay mathematically alive in the AL West race.
    - Seattle Mariners 10, Oakland Athletics 9: The A's end the night as they started it, needing a win and an Angels loss to clinch the AL West.
  - National League:
    - Cincinnati Reds 5, Chicago Cubs 4: In his first appearance since a September 4 toe injury, Ken Griffey Jr. hits a three-run pinch-hit homer in the eighth to give the Reds their winning margin, tying Reggie Jackson for 10th on the all-time home run list.
    - Houston Astros 5, Philadelphia Phillies 4: In a makeup of a September 5 rainout, the Astros win their sixth straight game and drop the Phils into a tie with the idle Los Angeles Dodgers for the wild-card lead.
    - San Diego Padres 6, St. Louis Cardinals 5: In the meantime, the Redbirds lose their sixth straight game, reducing their lead over the Astros in the NL Central to 2½ games. The Padres stretch their AL West lead to two games over the Dodgers.
- NFL Monday Night Football: New Orleans Saints 23, Atlanta Falcons 3
  - In the first NFL game in New Orleans since Hurricane Katrina, which saw a pregame show featuring Green Day and U2 and a coin toss conducted by former President George H. W. Bush, the Saints score a touchdown on a blocked punt 90 seconds in, and never look back. Drew Brees goes 20-for-28 passing with 180 yards and a TD, while the Saints defense holds the Falcons to 229 total yards.

== 24 September 2006 (Sunday) ==
- Major League Baseball playoff races
  - American League:
    - Detroit Tigers 11, Kansas City Royals 4: The Tigers clinch a post-season spot for the first time since 1987.
    - Minnesota Twins 6, Baltimore Orioles 4: The Tigers remain 1½ games ahead of Minnesota in the American League Central.
    - |Los Angeles Angels 7, Oakland Athletics 1: Oakland's magic number for the AL West title remains at 2.
  - National League:
    - San Diego Padres 2, Pittsburgh Pirates 1: Trevor Hoffman earns his 479th career save, setting a major league record previously held by Lee Smith.
    - Los Angeles Dodgers 5, Arizona Diamondbacks 1: Nomar Garciaparra hits a walk-off grand slam, and the Dodgers remain 1½ games behind the Padres in the NL West.
    - Philadelphia Phillies 10, Florida Marlins 7: Chase Utley hits two homers in the win, keeping the Pheightin' Phillies ½ ahead of the Dodgers for the Wild Card.
    - Colorado Rockies 9, Atlanta Braves 8: This loss, combined with the Phillies' win, mathematically eliminates the Braves from the NL wild card race. This will be the first time since 1990 that the Braves will have missed the postseason.
    - Cincinnati Reds 3, Chicago Cubs 2
    - Houston Astros 7, St. Louis Cardinals 3
- World Chess Championship
  - Vladimir Kramnik takes a 2–0 lead over Veselin Topalov
- Golf: 36th Ryder Cup Matches
  - Team Europe retains the Ryder Cup by an 18½–9½ margin over Team United States. The victory, by the same margin as in 2004, also makes this European team the first to win three straight Ryder Cups outright.
- National Football League Week 3:
  - Carolina Panthers 26, Tampa Bay Buccaneers 24: John Kasay's fourth field goal, a 48-yarder on the last play, gives Carolina its first win. The loss is tempered by Bucs' QB Chris Simms having emergency spleen-removal surgery and a blood transfusion following the game. Simms' life is not in danger.
  - Chicago Bears 19, Minnesota Vikings 16: Rex Grossman hits Rashied Davis on a 24-yard touchdown pass with 1:52 to play for the only offensive touchdown in a game dominated by defense.
  - Cincinnati Bengals 28, Pittsburgh Steelers 20: Two fourth-quarter Pittsburgh fumbles lead to two T. J. Houshmandzadeh touchdown receptions.
  - Green Bay Packers 31, Detroit Lions 24: Brett Favre becomes the second NFL quarterback, after Dan Marino, to throw 400 touchdown passes in his career.
  - Indianapolis Colts 21, Jacksonville Jaguars 14: Terrence Wilkins returns a punt 82 yards for an Indy touchdown, but Peyton Manning's first rushing TD since 2002 proves to be the difference.
  - New York Jets 28, Buffalo Bills 21 – The Bills record 475 total yards but commit three costly turnovers and go 0-for-3 on fourth-down conversions.
  - Miami Dolphins 13, Tennessee Titans 10: Travis Daniels seals the game with an interception after Olindo Mare kicks a 39-yard field goal with 3:39 left.
  - Washington Redskins 31, Houston Texans 15: Redskins quarterback Mark Brunell completes his first 22 passes, breaking the previous NFL single-game record of 21 straight completions by Rich Gannon in 2001.
  - Baltimore Ravens 15, Cleveland Browns, 14: The Ravens sack Charlie Frye seven times and win on a last-minute 52-yard field goal from Matt Stover.
  - Seattle Seahawks 42, New York Giants 30: Seattle takes a 35–0 lead in the second quarter and withstands a furious fourth-quarter comeback attempt. Matt Hasselbeck ties a career-high with five touchdown passes.
  - Philadelphia Eagles 38, San Francisco 49ers 24 : Brian Westbrook puts up 164 yards from scrimmage and scores three touchdowns as the Eagles bounce back from last week's humbling loss in overtime to the Giants.
  - St. Louis Rams 16, Arizona Cardinals 14: Kurt Warner throws three interceptions, then fumbles a snap in Rams territory with less than two minutes left after the Rams fumble inside their 20-yard line.
  - Denver Broncos 17, New England Patriots 7: Javon Walker catches touchdown passes of 32 and 83 yards for Denver.
  - Idle: Dallas Cowboys, Oakland Raiders, Kansas City Chiefs, San Diego Chargers.
- Basketball: University Athletics Association of the Philippines 69th basketball tournament – Championship round (Philippine Daily Inquirer):
  - Men's Finals: (1) Ateneo Blue Eagles 73, (3) UST Growling Tigers 72 – a tightly contested game all throughout, the Tigers converted a fadeaway jumper with a second remaining in the final period to put them up, 72–71. After a time out, the Eagles had an open man in the paint, in which they capitalized, escaping with a 73–72 finish.
  - Women's Finals: (2) FEU Lady Tamaraws 75, (3) UST Tigresses 67 – the Lady Tamaraws avenged their last-second loss in Game 1 to set up a deciding third game in their series against the Tigresses.
  - Juniors' Finals: (1) Ateneo Blue Eaglets 73, (2) FEU-FERN Baby Tamaraws 65 – the Eaglets shook off rust and lead practically from start to finish as they extend the series to a deciding third game.
- Auto racing:
  - Chase for the NEXTEL Cup: Jeff Burton wins the Dover 400 and claims the points lead.
  - Champ Car: A. J. Allmendinger wins the Grand Prix of Road America, marred by a major accident involving Katherine Legge.

== 23 September 2006 (Saturday) ==
- 2006 Australian Football League Finals Series – Week 3
  - Preliminary Final: West Coast Eagles 11.19 (85), Adelaide Crows 11.9 (75)
- Basketball: 2006 FIBA World Championship for Women, Final
  - Australia 91, Russia 74 — The Opals win their first gold in a major world event behind 28 points from tournament MVP Penny Taylor.
- Major League Baseball:
  - Barry Bonds hits his 734th career home run to set a new National League career record. However, his San Francisco Giants lose 10–8 to the Milwaukee Brewers in Milwaukee, where previous NL record holder and current all-time MLB career home run leader Hank Aaron started and finished his major-league career.
- World Chess Championship
  - Vladimir Kramnik takes a 1–0 lead over Veselin Topalov
- American football: Associated Press NCAA Division I-A Top 25:
  - (1) Ohio State 28, (24) Penn State 6
  - (2) Auburn 38, Buffalo 7
  - (3) USC 20, Arizona 3
  - (4) West Virginia 27, East Carolina 10
  - (5) Florida 26, Kentucky 7
  - (6) Michigan 27, Wisconsin 13
  - (7) Texas 37, Iowa State 14
  - (8) Louisville 24, Kansas State 6
  - (9) Georgia 14, Colorado 13
  - (10) LSU 49, Tulane 7
  - (11) Virginia Tech 29, Cincinnati 13
  - (12) Notre Dame 40, Michigan State 37: On the 40th anniversary of "The Game of the Century", The Irish come back from a 17-point deficit to beat the Spartans in East Lansing.
  - (14) Iowa 24, Illinois 7
  - (15) Tennessee 33, Marshall 7
  - (17) Oklahoma 59, Middle Tennessee 0
  - (18) Florida State 55, Rice 7
  - (19) Clemson 52, North Carolina 7
  - NC State 17, (20) Boston College 15
  - (21) California 49, (22) Arizona State 21
  - (23) Nebraska 56, Troy 0
  - (25) Boise State 41, Hawaiʻi 34

== 22 September 2006 (Friday) ==
- 2006 Australian Football League Finals Series – Week 3
  - Preliminary Final: Sydney Swans 19.13 (127), Fremantle Dockers 14.8 (92)
- Major League Baseball:
  - In a 3–2 win over the New York Mets, the Washington Nationals' Alfonso Soriano becomes the first player in MLB history to collect 40 home runs, 40 stolen bases, and 40 doubles in a season.
  - Barry Bonds hits his 733rd career home run, tying Hank Aaron for the National League record. The blast took place atMiller Park in Milwaukee, the same city where Aaron played the first half of his career with the Milwaukee Braves and finished it with the Milwaukee Brewers.
- Basketball: 82nd NCAA (Philippines) basketball tournament – Championship round (Philippine Daily Inquirer)
  - Seniors' tournament: (1) San Beda Red Lions 68, (2) PCU Dolphins 67
    - In the deciding Game 3 of the Championship series between San Beda and Philippine Christian, the Dolphins had a better start; although the Red Lions caught up with them and blew the game wide open, leading by as much as twenty points. Down by fifteen points at the start of the fourth quarter, the Dolphins mounted a furious comeback, cutting the lead into one point with 24.8 seconds remaining. After a San Beda turnover, PCU had a crack on winning the game – and the championship. The Dolphins play set up took too long, and with time running out, the Dolphins shot the ball; it bounced off the rim, leading into a San Beda rebound. San Beda wins their first seniors basketball title in 28 years. Red Lion Yousif Aljamal was named Finals Most Valuable Player.

== 21 September 2006 (Thursday) ==
- Major League Baseball: David Ortiz breaks Jimmie Foxx' 68-year-old Boston Red Sox team record for home runs in a season with his 51st, a solo shot against Johan Santana of the Minnesota Twins. Ortiz later hits a second home run in the Sox' 6–0 win, which keeps the Twins one-half game behind the Detroit Tigers in the American League Central Division.
- Basketball:
  - Only nine months after undergoing surgery to have his entire colon removed, former NBA standout Dajuan Wagner signs a two-year deal with the Golden State Warriors.
  - University Athletics Association of the Philippines 69th basketball tournament semifinals (Philippine Daily Inquirer)
    - Men's semifinals: (3) UST Growling Tigers 82, (2) UE Red Warriors 81
      - Title favorite UE succumbed to pressure and was eliminated in the title hunt; the Tigers converted a three-point play with 55 seconds remaining to lead 82–79. Despite a two-point field goal by the Warriors, they weren't able to capitalize in the UST turnover as they missed two field goal attempts to end their season.
    - Women's Finals: (1) UST Tigresses 52, (2) FEU Lady Tamaraws 49 – a buzzer-beating three-pointer from UST puts them up 1–0 in the best of three series.
    - Juniors' Finals: (2) FEU-FERN Baby Tamaraws 67, (1) Ateneo Blue Eaglets 55 – the undefeated Ateneo squad absorbed its first setback in the season as they trail 0–1 in the best of three series.

== 20 September 2006 (Wednesday) ==
- Major League Baseball: The New York Yankees lost to the Toronto Blue Jays 3–2, but they clinched their ninth straight American League East title when the Minnesota Twins defeat the Boston Red Sox, 8–2. The nine straight is the longest current post-season run in baseball.
- Basketball: 82nd NCAA (Philippines) basketball tournament – Championship round (Manila Bulletin)
  - Seniors' tournament: (2) PCU Dolphins 72, (1) San Beda Red Lions 50
    - With their backs against the wall, the PCU Dolphins overcame the San Beda Red Lions, blowing out the felines at the second game of their best-of-three series at the Araneta Coliseum. The third game will decide this year's seniors' championship.
  - Juniors' tournament: (2) San Sebastian Staglets 65, (1) PCU Baby Dolphins 41
    - After trailing 0–6, the Staglets evened the score at 6-all and ultimately took a commanding lead – 28 points at one point – to win their second consecutive juniors' championship.

== 19 September 2006 (Tuesday) ==
- Minor League Baseball: The Tucson Sidewinders of the Pacific Coast League defeat the International League Toledo Mud Hens 5–2 to win the one-game AAA Championship at the AT&T Bricktown Ballpark in Oklahoma City, Oklahoma.

== 18 September 2006 (Monday) ==
- Major League Baseball:
  - The New York Mets defeat the Florida Marlins, 4–0, to clinch their first National League East title since 1988, and the first not to be claimed by the Atlanta Braves since the 1994 realignment. The last team other than the Braves to win the NL East were the Philadelphia Phillies in 1993.
  - The Los Angeles Dodgers hit back-to-back-to-back-to-back home runs in the ninth inning to tie the San Diego Padres, then win, 11–10, on Nomar Garciaparra's two-run homer in the 10th inning. It is the fourth time in major-league history, and the first time since 1964, that a team hits four consecutive home runs. (AP via Boston Globe)
- National Football League:
  - Monday Night Football: Jacksonville Jaguars 9, Pittsburgh Steelers 0 — In the first shutout of a defending Super Bowl champion since 1981, the Jaguars hold the Steelers to 26 rushing yards. Three Josh Scobee field goals comprise the scoring; Rashean Mathis has two interceptions.
  - Cincinnati Bengals linebacker David Pollack and Philadelphia Eagles defensive end Jevon Kearse will miss the rest of the season with injuries, their respective teams announce. (nfl.com)
- Basketball: 82nd NCAA (Philippines) basketball tournament – Championship round (Philippine Daily Inquirer)
  - Seniors' tournament: (1) San Beda Red Lions 71, (2) PCU Dolphins 57
    - With the Dolphins keeping the game close at the first two quarters, the Red Lions charged ahead at the third period, scoring twenty points as opposed to PCU's five. San Beda pulled away at the final quarter to draw first blood in the best-of-three championship series. San Beda's Nigerian student Samuel Ekwe was named Most Valuable Player, Rookie of the Year, Defensive Player of the Year and member of the all-NCAA team.
  - Juniors' tournament: (2) San Sebastian Staglets 57, (1) PCU Baby Dolphins 50
    - The Baby Dolphins posted leads at the first three quarters. With San Sebastian's shooters converting outside shots, the Staglets turned the tables and captured the lead at the dying seconds. The Baby Dolphins had two chances to tie but they missed their attempts, giving the Staglets the 1–0 lead in the best-of-three series.

== 17 September 2006 (Sunday) ==
- National Football League Week 2:
  - Cincinnati Bengals 34, Cleveland Browns 17
  - Buffalo Bills 16, Miami Dolphins 6
  - Minnesota Vikings 16, Carolina Panthers 13 (OT)
  - Chicago Bears 34, Detroit Lions 7
  - Indianapolis Colts 43, Houston Texans 24
  - New York Giants 30, Philadelphia Eagles 24 (OT): The G-men come from a 17-point deficit – aided by an ill-advised personal foul against the Eagles – and win on a Plaxico Burress 31-yard touchdown pass from Eli Manning.
  - Baltimore Ravens 28, Oakland Raiders 6
  - Atlanta Falcons 14, Tampa Bay Buccaneers 3: For the third time in NFL history, a quarterback (Michael Vick) and a running back (Warrick Dunn) each get 100 yards rushing. The Philadelphia Eagles turned the trick twice before in 1990 and 2002.
  - Seattle Seahawks 21, Arizona Cardinals 10
  - San Francisco 49ers 20, St. Louis Rams 13
  - Denver Broncos 9, Kansas City Chiefs 6 (OT)
  - New England Patriots 24, New York Jets 17: Eric Mangini loses to his teacher Bill Belichick.
  - San Diego Chargers 40, Tennessee Titans 7
  - Dallas Cowboys 24, Washington Redskins 10: The Cowboys win, but Terrell Owens is lost for between three and five weeks with a broken hand.
- Cycling: Alexander Vinokourov wins the 2006 Tour of Spain.
- Tennis: The second day of the 2006 Fed Cup Final takes place in Charleroi, with the score 1–1 after the previous day. The game is decided in the fifth and final match, the doubles, when Justine Henin-Hardenne is forced to retire through injury making Italy the 2006 Fed Cup winners.
  - Belgium 2–3 Italy:
    - (Belgium) Justine Henin-Hardenne beats (Italy) Francesca Schiavone 6–4 7–5.
    - (Italy) Mara Santangelo beats (Belgium) Kirsten Flipkens 6–7 6–3 6–0.
    - (Belgium) Kirsten Flipkens and Justine Henin-Hardenne retire against (Italy) Francesca Schiavone and Roberta Vinci 3–6 6–2 2–0.
- Basketball:
  - Five players at Duquesne University in Pittsburgh, Pennsylvania are shot on campus early today after they tried to calm a disturbed man at a dance. Three of the five are hospitalized, with one in critical condition. (ESPN)
  - University Athletics Association of the Philippines 69th basketball tournament semifinals (Philippine Daily Inquirer)
    - Men's tournament: (1) Ateneo Blue Eagles 76, (4) Adamson Soaring Falcons 73
      - A costly miss by the Falcons with 1.9 seconds left gave the Eagles the victory – and the first Finals berth.
    - Men's tournament: (3) UST Growling Tigers 79, (2) UE Red Warriors 75
      - A three-point play by the Tigers in the last 21.1 seconds gave UST enough breathing room to force an elimination game against the Red Warriors.
    - Women's tournament: (1) UST Tigresses 72, (4) UP Lady Maroons 68; (2) FEU Lady Tamaraws 46, (3) Ateneo Lady Eagles 44
      - UST and FEU face off in the best-of-three Finals series.
    - Juniors' tournament: (2) FEU-FERN Baby Tamaraws 76, (4) Adamson Baby Falcons 66
      - FEU-FERN meets the Ateneo Blue Eaglets in their best-of-three Finals series.
- Rugby union
  - 2006 Women's Rugby World Cup
    - The Black Ferns of New Zealand defeat England in the final to win their third title in a row. France defeats hosts Canada in the third/fourth place playoff.

Auto racing: Kevin Harvick wins the Sylvania 300 as the 2006 Chase for the NEXTEL Cup starts.

== 16 September 2006 (Saturday) ==
- Baseball – Washington Nationals second baseman Alfonso Soriano becomes the fourth player in major league history to achieve 40 home runs and 40 stolen bases in a season. He reaches the milestone with a steal of second against the Milwaukee Brewers. (CNNSI)
- 2006 Wheelchair Rugby World Championships (TVNZ)
  - Final – United States 34–30 New Zealand
  - 3rd place playoff – Canada 23–19 United Kingdom
- 2006 Australian Football League Finals Series – Week 2
  - Semifinal: West Coast Eagles 16.17 (113), Western Bulldogs 5.9 (39)
- American football: Associated Press NCAA Division I-A Top 25:
  - (1) Ohio State 37, Cincinnati 7
  - (11) Michigan 47, (2) Notre Dame 21
  - (3) Auburn 7, (6) LSU 3
  - (4) USC 28, (19) Nebraska 10
  - (7) Florida 21, (13) Tennessee 20
  - (8) Texas 52, Rice 7
  - Clemson 27, (9) Florida State 20
  - (10) Georgia 34, UAB 0
  - (12) Louisville 31, (17) Miami (Florida) 7
  - (14) Virginia Tech 36, Duke 0
  - (18) Oregon 34, (15) Oklahoma 33
  - (16) Iowa 27, Iowa State 17
  - (20) TCU 12, (24) Texas Tech 3
  - (21) Cal 42, Portland State 16
  - (22) Arizona State 21, Colorado 3
  - (23) Boston College 30, BYU 23 (2OT)
  - (25) Penn State 37, Youngstown State 3
- Tennis: In Charleroi, the 2006 Fed Cup Final between Belgium and Italy takes place during the weekend, with on the opening day the first two singles matches. With Belgian Kim Clijsters absent through injury, Italy has an opportunity to win its first ever Fed Cup.
  - Belgium 1–1 Italy:
    - (Italy) Francesca Schiavone beats (Belgium) Kirsten Flipkens 6–1 6–3.
    - (Belgium) Justine Henin-Hardenne beats (Italy) Flavia Pennetta 6–4 7–5.

== 15 September 2006 (Friday) ==
- 2006 Australian Football League Finals Series – Week 2
  - Semifinal: Fremantle Dockers 14.18 (102), Melbourne Demons 11.8 (74)
- Association football:
  - UEFA has lifted its month-long ban on matches in Israel, effective immediately. The recent UEFA policy of restricting home matches involving Israeli club teams or the Israel national team to the Tel Aviv area is restored. (UEFA)

== 14 September 2006 (Thursday) ==
- Association football: 2006–07 UEFA Cup, first round, first leg.
  - Chornomorets Odesa 0 – 1 Hapoel Tel Aviv
  - Sporting Braga 2 – 0 Chievo
  - Levadia Tallinn 0 – 1 Newcastle United
  - Molde 0 – 0 Rangers
  - Standard Liège 0 – 1 Celta Vigo
  - Maccabi Haifa 1 – 1 Litex Lovech (played at Nijmegen, Netherlands)
  - Derry City 0 – 0 Paris St-Germain
  - Hertha Berlin 2 – 2 Odense
  - Legia Warsaw 1 – 1 Austria Vienna
  - Panathinaikos 1 – 1 Metalurh Zaporizhzhya
  - Lokomotiv Moscow 2 – 1 Zulte-Waregem
  - Hearts 0 – 2 Sparta Prague
  - Fenerbahçe 2 – 1 Randers
  - Red Bull Salzburg 2 – 2 Blackburn Rovers
  - Schalke 04 1 – 0 Nancy
  - Ethnikos Achna 0 – 0 Lens
  - Slovan Liberec 2 – 0 Red Star Belgrade
  - AZ Alkmaar 3 – 2 Kayserispor
  - Rubin Kazan 0 – 1 Parma
  - Atromitos 1 – 2 Sevilla
  - Eintracht Frankfurt 4 – 0 Brøndby
  - Beşiktaş 2 – 0 CSKA Sofia
  - Vitória Setúbal 0 – 3 Heerenveen
  - Marseille 1 – 0 Mladá Boleslav
  - Åtvidaberg 0 – 3 Grasshoppers
  - Rapid Bucharest 1 – 0 Nacional
  - Trabzonspor 2 – 2 Osasuna
  - FC Basel 6 – 2 Rabotnički
  - West Ham United 0 – 1 Palermo
  - Lokomotiv Sofia 2 – 2 Feyenoord
  - Ružomberok 0 – 1 Club Brugge
  - FC Sion 0 – 0 Bayer Leverkusen
  - FK Partizan 4 – 2 Groningen
  - Skoda Xanthi 3 – 4 Dinamo Bucharest
  - Slavia Prague 0 – 1 Tottenham Hotspur
  - I.K. Start 2 – 5 Ajax
  - Artmedia Bratislava 2 – 2 Espanyol
  - Wisła Kraków 0 – 1 Iraklis
  - Livorno 2 – 0 Pasching
  - Dinamo Zagreb 1 – 2 Auxerre
- American football: Associated Press NCAA Division I-A Top 25:
  - (5) West Virginia 45, Maryland 24
- Basketball: 69th University Athletics Association of the Philippines basketball tournament – Semifinal round (Philippine Star)
  - Men's tournament: UST Growling Tigers 85, Adamson Soaring Falcons 71
    - The Tigers seized the 3rd seed in this classification game. UST will meet second seed UE Red Warriors while the Falcons will face first seed Ateneo Blue Eagles in the semifinals.
  - Women's tournament: (4) UP Lady Maroons 72, (1) UST Tigresses 64; (3) Ateneo Lady Eagles 63, FEU Lady Tamaraws 53
  - Juniors' tournament: (4) Adamson Baby Falcons 84, (3) UPIS Junior Maroons 78

== 13 September 2006 (Wednesday) ==
- Association football: 2006–07 UEFA Champions League – Group stage – Matchday 1 (UEFA.com)
  - Group E: Dynamo Kyiv 1 – 4 Steaua Bucharest
  - Group E: Lyon 2 – 0 Real Madrid
  - Group F: Manchester United 3 – 2 Celtic
  - Group F: Copenhagen 0 – 0 Benfica
  - Group G: FC Porto 0 – 0 CSKA Moscow
  - Group G: Hamburg 1 – 2 Arsenal
  - Group H: Anderlecht 1 – 1 Lille
  - Group H: Milan 3 – 0 AEK
- Basketball: 82nd NCAA (Philippines) basketball tournament – Semifinal round (Philippine Daily Inquirer)
  - Seniors' tournament: (1) San Beda Red Lions 55, (4) Mapúa Cardinals 51
    - The Red Lions barged into their first Finals appearance in nine years after the overcame the Cardinals in a come from behind win.
  - Seniors' tournament: (2) PCU Dolphins 72, (3) Letran Knights 50
    - The Dolphins came out with all cylinders firing as they held off Letran from defending their title in the Finals. The Dolphins are in their third straight Finals appearance.
  - Juniors' tournament: (2) San Sebastian Staglets 61, (3) San Beda Red Cubs 52; (1) PCU Baby Dolphins 67, (4) JRU Light Bombers 66

== 12 September 2006 (Tuesday) ==
- Association football: 2006–07 UEFA Champions League – Group stage – Matchday 1 (UEFA.com)
  - Group A: Barcelona 5 – 0 Levski Sofia
  - Group A: Chelsea 2 – 0 Werder Bremen
  - Group B: Sporting 1 – 0 Internazionale
  - Group B: Bayern Munich 4 – 0 Spartak Moscow
  - Group C: Galatasaray 0 – 0 Bordeaux
  - Group C: PSV 0 – 0 Liverpool
  - Group D: Olympiakos 2 – 4 Valencia
    - Fernando Morientes has a hat-trick for Valencia.
  - Group D: Roma 4 – 0 Shakhtar Donetsk
- National Football League: One day after acquiring rights to wide receiver Deion Branch from the New England Patriots in exchange for a first-round draft pick, the Seattle Seahawks sign him to a $39-million contract. Also, Boston newspapers report the Patriots have filed a tampering charge against the New York Jets, accusing the Jets of discussing a trade with Branch while he was still under contract with New England. (AP via Canoe.ca)
- Major League Baseball: Bobby Abreu ties an American League record for RBIs in an inning with six in the first inning of the New York Yankees' game against the Tampa Bay Devil Rays. Abreu homers and doubles in the Yankees' nine-run inning.

== 11 September 2006 (Monday) ==
- NFL Monday Night Football season opening doubleheader:
  - Minnesota Vikings 19, Washington Redskins 16: Ryan Longwell kicks a 31-yard field goal with 1 minute remaining to give Minnesota the lead. Forty-eight seconds later, John Hall misses a 48-yard field goal that would have tied the game.
  - San Diego Chargers 27, Oakland Raiders 0: LaDainian Tomlinson rushes for 131 yards and a touchdown, outgaining the Raiders offense (129 yards) by himself. Chargers QB Philip Rivers only attempts 11 passes in the game but completes eight, including a TD. The Chargers defense collects nine sacks, three by Shawne Merriman.
- Ice hockey: New York Islanders goaltender Rick DiPietro signs a 15-year contract with the club, the second-longest contract in league history behind Wayne Gretzky's uncompleted 20-year contract in 1979. Controversial owner Charles Wang was directly involved in negotiations, and had several seasons ago signed centre Alexei Yashin to a similar super-long-term contract. (TSN)

== 10 September 2006 (Sunday) ==
- Auto racing
  - Michael Schumacher, the most successful driver in Formula One history, announces that he is to retire following the season, making the announcement following a victory in the Italian Grand Prix.(BBC)
  - IRL: Dan Wheldon wins the Peak Antifreeze Indy 300. Sam Hornish Jr. finishes third, winning the season championship by tiebreaker over Wheldon due to more wins during the season.
- National Football League Week 1 Sunday games:
  - New Orleans Saints 19, Cleveland Browns 14: Reggie Bush runs for 61 yards on 14 carries and catches eight passes for 58 yards in his regular-season debut.
  - Atlanta Falcons 20, Carolina Panthers 6: Atlanta puts up 252 rushing yards against the team widely favored to win the NFC.
  - Baltimore Ravens 27, Tampa Bay Buccaneers 0: The Ravens defense intercepts Chris Simms three times, sacks him three times and holds the Bucs to 26 rushing yards.
  - New England Patriots 19, Buffalo Bills 17: The Pats win on a fourth-quarter safety by Ty Warren.
  - Cincinnati Bengals 23, Kansas City Chiefs 10: The Bengals record seven sacks. Bengals defensive end Robert Geathers knocks Chiefs quarterback Trent Green out of the game with a hit in the third quarter.
  - St. Louis Rams 18, Denver Broncos 10: The Rams don't get in the endzone, but win on six Jeff Wilkins field goals and six Broncos turnovers.
  - New York Jets 23, Tennessee Titans 16: After losing a 16-point lead in the fourth-quarter, the Jets win on a 12-yard touchdown pass from Chad Pennington to Chris Baker.
  - Philadelphia Eagles 24, Houston Texans 10: Donovan McNabb completes 24 of 35 passes for 314 yards and three touchdowns.
  - Seattle Seahawks 9, Detroit Lions 6: The defending NFC champs need a last-second Josh Brown field goal to beat the Lions. Detroit blocked two field goals in a game for the first time since 2001.
  - Chicago Bears 26, Green Bay Packers 0: The Packers are shut out for the first time since 1991. Devin Hester returns a punt 84 yards for a touchdown, and Robbie Gould kicks four field goals for the Bears.
  - Jacksonville Jaguars 24, Dallas Cowboys 17: The Jags fall behind 10–0 early but go ahead on rushing touchdowns by Byron Leftwich and Fred Taylor. Terrell Owens has six catches for 80 yards and a touchdown in his Cowboys debut.
  - Arizona Cardinals 34, San Francisco 49ers 27: The Cardinals score three first-quarter touchdowns — three more than they scored last year — and hold on to win the first game at University of Phoenix Stadium. Kurt Warner throws for 301 yards and three touchdowns.
  - Indianapolis Colts 26, New York Giants 21: Peyton Manning outduels brother Eli in their first meeting, throwing for 276 yards and a touchdown to Dallas Clark that puts Indianapolis up 13–0 in the second quarter. Eli completes two touchdown passes to keep the game close, but is charged with a costly fumble and interception in the second half.
- Tennis:
  - 2006 U.S. Open men's final: Roger Federer (1) def. Andy Roddick (9), 6–2, 4–6, 7–5, 6–1, winning his third straight U.S. Open.
- 2006 Australian Football League Finals Series – Week 1
  - Elimination Final: Western Bulldogs 18.13 (121), Collingwood Magpies 11.14 (80)

== 9 September 2006 (Saturday) ==
- Auto racing:
  - NASCAR NEXTEL Cup: Kevin Harvick wins the Chevy Rock and Roll 400, the final race before the Chase for the NEXTEL Cup. Tony Stewart fails to qualify and will be unable to defend his crown. Joining Matt Kenseth and Jimmie Johnson, who qualified earlier are Kevin Harvick, Jeff Gordon, Kyle Busch, Dale Earnhardt Jr., Denny Hamlin, Mark Martin, Jeff Burton and Kasey Kahne.
- American football: Associated Press NCAA Division I-A top 25:
  - (1) Ohio State 24, (2) Texas 7
  - (T4) Auburn 34, Mississippi State 0
  - (T4) Notre Dame 41, (19) Penn State 17
  - (6) West Virginia 52, Eastern Washington 3
  - (7) Florida 42, Central Florida 0
  - (8) LSU 45, Arizona 3
  - (9) Florida State 24, Troy 17
  - (10) Michigan 41, Central Michigan 17
  - (11) Tennessee 31, Air Force 30
  - (12) Georgia 18, South Carolina 0
  - (13) Louisville 62, Temple 0
  - (14) Iowa 20, Syracuse 13 (2 OT)
  - (15) Oklahoma 37, Washington 20
  - (16) Virginia Tech 35, North Carolina 10
  - (17) Miami (FL) 51, Florida A&M 10
  - Boston College 34, (18) Clemson 33 (2 OT)
  - (20) Oregon 31, Fresno State 24
  - (21) Nebraska 56, Nicholls State 7
  - (22) Cal 42, Minnesota 17
  - (23) TCU 46, UC-Davis 13
  - (24) Texas Tech 38, UTEP 35 (OT)
  - (25) Arizona State 52, Nevada 21
- Basketball:
  - The Detroit Shock wins the Women's National Basketball Association championship defeating defending champions, the Sacramento Monarchs, 80–75 in Game 5 of the final series. (Sports Illustrated)
  - Season host UE Red Warriors defeated the Ateneo Blue Eagles at the elimination round finale of the 69th University Athletics Association of the Philippines men's basketball tournament, 78–75, at the PhilSports Arena. Ateneo maintained their #1 seed at the crossover Finals, with a 10–2 record. The Red Warriors, on the other hand, retained the second seed with an 8–4 card. Rounding out the semifinals cast are the Adamson Soaring Falcons and the UST Growling Tigers tied with 6–6. The Falcons and the Tigers will dispute third seed in a classification game. Eliminated are the defending champions FEU Tamaraws (5–7), UP Fighting Maroons (4–8), NU Bulldogs (3–9) and De La Salle Green Archers (suspended). Philippine Daily Inquirer
- Rugby union: 2006 Tri Nations Series
  - South Africa 24–16 Australia at Ellis Park, Johannesburg
    - The Springboks end the Tri Nations with the wooden spoon but on a high note, defeating the Wallabies in a mistake-riddled match behind tries by Fourie du Preez and Breyton Paulse.
- Tennis:
  - 2006 U.S. Open women's final: Maria Sharapova defeats Justine Henin-Hardenne 6–4, 6–4 for her second career Grand Slam championship.
- 2006 Australian Football League Finals Series – Week 1
  - Qualifying Final (Winner gets Week 2 bye): Adelaide Crows 10.16 (76), Fremantle Dockers 7.4 (46)
  - Qualifying Final: Sydney Swans: 13.7 (85), West Coast Eagles 12.12 (84)

== 8 September 2006 (Friday) ==
- Basketball: The PCU Dolphins seized the last twice to beat advantage in the semifinals of the 82nd National Collegiate Athletic Association (Philippines) men's basketball tournament, as they beat the Letran Knights, 67–62, at the Araneta Coliseum. Letran now has to win twice against the Dolphins in order to advance to the best-of-three Finals against the winner of the San Beda Red Lions–Mapúa Cardinals semifinal series.
- 2006 Australian Football League Finals Series – Week 1
  - Elimination Final (Loser is eliminated): Melbourne Demons 13.12 (90), St. Kilda Saints 10.12 (72)

== 7 September 2006 (Thursday) ==
- National Football League Kickoff Game:
  - Pittsburgh Steelers 28, Miami Dolphins 17 – Charlie Batch throws for 209 yards and three touchdowns with one fumble in the victory in place of injured Ben Roethlisberger. Daunte Culpepper returns from his injury to throw for 262 yards with 2 interceptions (by Troy Polamalu and Joey Porter). Ronnie Brown rushed for 2 touchdowns for the Dolphins.

== 6 September 2006 (Wednesday) ==
- Baseball: Florida Marlins pitcher Aníbal Sánchez throws a no-hitter against the Arizona Diamondbacks. The Marlins win 2–0. Sánchez' no-hitter is the first in the major leagues since Randy Johnson's perfect game in May 2004 and the fourth in Marlins history. It also ends the longest gap in time between no-hitters in Major League Baseball since World War II, and the longest in history in terms of total major-league games played.
- Football: Euro 2008 qualifying
  - Group A: Finland 1–1 Portugal
  - Group A: Poland 1–1 Serbia
  - Group A: Armenia 0–1 Belgium
  - Group A: Azerbaijan 1–1 Kazakhstan
  - Group B: France 3–1 Italy
  - Group B: Lithuania 1–2 Scotland
  - Group B: Ukraine 3–2 Georgia
  - Group C: Turkey 2–0 Malta
  - Group C: Norway 2–0 Moldova
  - Group C: Bosnia and Herzegovina 1–3 Hungary
  - Group D: San Marino 0–13 Germany
  - Group D: Slovakia 0–3 Czech Republic
  - Group E: North Macedonia 0–1 England
  - Group E: Israel 4–1 Andorra
  - Group E: Russia 0–0 Croatia
  - Group F: Iceland 0–2 Denmark
  - Group F: Sweden 3–1 Liechtenstein
  - Group F: Northern Ireland 3–2 Spain
  - Group G: Albania 0–2 Romania
  - Group G: Netherlands 3–0 Belarus
  - Group G: Bulgaria 3–0 Slovenia
- Basketball: The San Beda Red Lions closed the elimination round of the 82nd National Collegiate Athletic Association (Philippines) men's basketball tournament, with a come from behind win against the Letran Knights, 54–44, at the Araneta Coliseum. Contested earlier was the game between the PCU Dolphins and the Mapúa Cardinals in which the Dolphins won, 75–65. Armed with a twice to beat advantage at the semifinals, San Beda finished at the top of the standings, with a 13 win-1 loss record, followed by Letran and PCU (tied at 10–4), and Mapua with 7–7. Out of contention are the UPHSD Altas (5–9), the JRU Heavy Bombers and the San Sebastian Stags (tied at 4–10), and season host St. Benilde Blazers (3–11). Letran and PCU will dispute the last twice to beat advantage slot at a later game.
  - 2006 WNBA Finals Game 4
    - Detroit Shock-72, Sacramento Monarchs-52, Series Tied 2-2

== 4 September 2006 (Monday) ==
- American football: Associated Press NCAA top 25
  - (11) Florida State 13, (10) Miami (FL) 10 – The Seminoles hold the Hurricanes to 12 yards, one first down and no points in the second half.
- Canadian football: Labour Day Classic
  - Calgary Stampeders 44, Edmonton Eskimos 23 – Eskies QB Ricky Ray was sacked five times in the Edmonton loss, while Calgary QB Henry Burris connected on three touchdown passes and rushed for one more in the Stamps victory. Edmonton is in danger of missing the CFL playoffs for the first time since 1971.
  - Toronto Argonauts 40, Hamilton Tiger-Cats 6 – Argos quarterback Damon Allen threw 207 passing yards, eclipsing Warren Moon to become the all-time leading passer in either Canadian or American football. The record-breaking play was a 29-yard touchdown pass to Arland Bruce III in the third quarter, one of Allen's two touchdowns of the day. Meanwhile, Hamilton's offensive woes continue, having not scored a touchdown in the past four games.
- Association football: The Confederation of African Football (CAF) announces the venues for three future African Cup of Nations competitions. The 2010 ACN will be held in Angola, the 2012 ACN will be shared by Gabon and Equatorial Guinea, and the 2014 ACN will be held in Libya. Nigeria will be held in reserve should any of the awarded countries prove unable to stage the competitions. CAF are also supporting Nigeria's bid for the 2009 FIFA Under-17 World Cup, which FIFA has already awarded to Africa. (CAFonline)

== 3 September 2006 (Sunday) ==
- Auto racing: Kasey Kahne wins the NASCAR NEXTEL Cup Sony HD 500. None of the remaining eight drivers in the top ten clinched a spot in the 2006 Chase for the NEXTEL Cup.
- Tennis: Andre Agassi loses to Benjamin Becker in the 4th round of the 2006 U.S. Open. The final score is 7–5, 6–7 (4), 6–4, 7–5. This match marks Agassi's retirement, after 21 years of playing in the US Open. MSNBC
- Basketball
  - 2006 FIBA World Championship — Championship Game
    - Spain 70, Greece 47 — No Pau Gasol? No problem for Spain. The Memphis Grizzlies star broke his foot in the semifinal against Argentina, but Jorge Garbajosa and Juan Carlos Navarro pick up the slack with 20 points each, and Spain's defense completely throttles a Greece team that had put 101 on Team USA in the other semifinal. This is the first gold medal for Spain in the World Championships. (CTV NEWS)
  - 2006 WNBA Finals Game 3
    - Sacramento Monarchs-89, Detroit Shock-69, Sacramento Leads 2-1
- American football: Associated Press NCAA top 25:
  - (13) Louisville 59, Kentucky 28
    - Louisville star running back and Heisman Trophy candidate Michael Bush suffers a broken leg in the third quarter, after rushing for three touchdowns and 128 yards.
  - (22) TCU 17, Baylor 7
- Canadian football: Labour Day Classic
  - Saskatchewan Roughriders 39, Winnipeg Blue Bombers 12: Riders QB Kerry Joseph runs for two touchdowns in the first quarter and two passing touchdowns in the second quarter to give the Green Riders the victory. The Blue Bombers have lost four straight, and will meet the Riders again in the Banjo Bowl next week.
- Association football: Friendly international at Emirates Stadium, London
  - Brazil 3–0 Argentina

== 2 September 2006 (Saturday) ==
- Basketball
  - 2006 FIBA World Championship — Third Place
    - United States 96, Argentina 81
- National Football League: Preseason roster cuts include Charles Rogers from the Detroit Lions, Ron Dayne from the Denver Broncos, Peter Warrick from the Seattle Seahawks, Marcus Vick from the Miami Dolphins and Lee Suggs from the Cleveland Browns. The Houston Texans put running back Domanick Davis on injured reserve.
- Baseball: Filling in for injured Cleveland Indians designated hitter Travis Hafner, Kevin Kouzmanoff becomes the first American League player to hit a grand slam in his first career at-bat. The Indians win 6–5 over the Texas Rangers. (AP via the Tribune Democrat)
- Roller Derby: The 2006 Roller Derby "Bumberbout" Flat Track Invitational in Seattle. Austin beat Seattle in the Championship Bout, 74 to 69.
- American football: Associated Press NCAA top 25
  - (1) Ohio State 35, Northern Illinois 12
  - (2) Notre Dame 14, Georgia Tech 10
  - (3) Texas 56, North Texas 7
  - (4) Auburn 40, Washington State 14
  - (5) West Virginia 42, Marshall 10
  - (6) USC 50, Arkansas 14
  - (7) Florida 34, Southern Miss 7
  - (8) LSU 45, Louisiana-Lafayette 3
  - (23) Tennessee 35, (9) Cal 18
  - (10) Oklahoma 24, UAB 17
  - (14) Michigan 27, Vanderbilt 7
  - (15) Georgia 48, Western Kentucky 12
  - (16) Iowa 41, Montana 7
  - (17) Virginia Tech 38, Northeastern 0
  - (18) Clemson 54, Florida Atlantic 6
  - (19) Penn State 34, Akron 16
  - (20) Nebraska 49, Louisiana Tech 10
  - (21) Oregon 48, Stanford 10
  - (25) Texas Tech 35, SMU 3
- Association football: 2008 UEFA European Football Championship qualifying
  - Group A: Poland 1 – 3 Finland
  - Group A: Serbia 1 – 0 Azerbaijan
  - Group B: Georgia 0 – 3 France
  - Group B: Italy 1 – 1 Lithuania
  - Group B: Scotland 6 – 0 Faroe Islands
    - Scotland's biggest win since an 8–0 win over Cyprus in 1969.
  - Group C: Moldova 0 – 1 Greece
  - Group C: Malta 2 – 5 Bosnia and Herzegovina
  - Group C: Hungary 1 – 4 Norway
  - Group D: Czech Republic 2 – 1 Wales
  - Group D: Germany 1 – 0 Republic of Ireland
  - Group D: Slovakia 6 – 1 Cyprus
  - Group E: England 5 – 0 Andorra
  - Group E: Estonia 0 – 1 Israel
  - Group F: Spain 4 – 0 Liechtenstein
  - Group F: Northern Ireland 0 – 3 Iceland
  - Group F: Latvia 0 – 1 Sweden
  - Group G: Romania 2 – 2 Bulgaria
  - Group G: Belarus 2 – 2 Albania
  - Group G: Luxembourg 0 – 1 Netherlands
- Rugby union: 2006 Tri Nations Series
  - South Africa 21–20 New Zealand at Royal Bafokeng Stadium, Rustenburg
    - The Springboks end the All Blacks 15 match streak of wins via a late André Pretorius penalty.

== 1 September 2006 (Friday) ==
- Basketball
  - 2006 FIBA World Championship semifinals
    - Greece 101, United States 95
    - Spain 75, Argentina 74
  - 2006 WNBA Finals Game 2
    - Detroit Shock 73, Sacramento Monarchs 63 – Series tied 1-1
- Canadian football: Labour Day Classic
  - BC Lions 48, Montreal Alouettes 13 – Montreal loses four consecutive games for the first time under head coach Don Matthews, thanks to a dominant first half by the Lions. However, BC quarterback Dave Dickenson is injured in the second quarter, and is replaced by backup Buck Pierce.
