= August 2006 in sports =

<<	August 2006					>>
Su	Mo	Tu	We	Th	Fr	Sa
		1	2	3	4	5
6	7	8	9	10	11	12
13	14	15	16	17	18	19
20	21	22	23	24	25	26
27	28	29	30	31
India; Sports

This list shows notable sports-related deaths, events, and notable outcomes that occurred in August of 2006.

== Deaths ==
- 26 – Sir Clyde Walcott
- 5 – Susan Butcher
- 4 – Elden Auker

== Sporting seasons ==
- Auto racing 2006:
  - Formula One; GP2; BTCC
  - Indy Racing League
  - NASCAR; Busch; Craftsman Truck
  - World Rally Championship
- Basketball: 2006 college basketball season in the Philippines:
  - NCAA Season 82
  - UAAP Season 69
- Cricket 2006: England
- Cycling 2006:
  - 2006 UCI ProTour
- Football 2006–07:
  - England FA Premier League
  - 2006–07 UEFA Champions League
  - 2006–07 UEFA Cup
- Rugby union 2006:
  - 2006 Air New Zealand Cup
  - 2006 Currie Cup
  - 2006–07 TOP 14
- U.S. and Canadian sports 2005–06:
  - 2006 MLB season
  - 2006 CFL season

== 31 August 2006 (Thursday) ==
- Rugby union
  - The 2006 Women's Rugby World Cup kicks off in Edmonton, Alberta, Canada
- Basketball
  - 2006 FIBA World Championship Fifth Place Bracket, Saitama City, Japan
    - France 75, Germany 73
    - Turkey 95, Lithuania 84
    - France will play Turkey for fifth place on September 2 at 17:30 JST (4:30am EDT). Germany will play Lithuania for seventh place on September 3 at 16:30 JST (3:30am EDT).

== 30 August 2006 (Wednesday) ==
- Baseball
  - Boston Red Sox pitcher Curt Schilling strikes out Nick Swisher of the Oakland Athletics to record his 3,000th strikeout. Schilling is the 14th pitcher to reach the milestone. Swisher struck out in the first inning of the Athletics' 7–2 win. (AP via Yahoo)
- Basketball
  - 2006 FIBA World Championship Quarterfinals, Saitama City, Japan
    - Greece 73, France 56
    - United States 85, Germany 65
  - WNBA Finals
    - Sacramento Monarchs-95, Detroit Shock-71 Sacramento Leads Series 1–0

== 29 August 2006 (Tuesday) ==
- Basketball
  - 2006 FIBA World Championship Quarterfinals, Saitama City, Japan
    - Argentina 83, Turkey 58
    - Spain 89, Lithuania 67
- Major League Baseball
  - Seattle Mariners relief pitcher Rafael Soriano receives a concussion after being struck by a line drive hit by Vladimir Guerrero of the Los Angeles Angels of Anaheim. No fracture occurs, and the injury is not serious. The play is ruled a base hit. The Mariners won the game, 6–4.

== 28 August 2006 (Monday) ==
- Baseball: 2006 Little League World Series Championship Game:
  - Columbus, Georgia 2, Kawaguchi, Saitama, Japan 1
- Football:
  - Former Manchester United and Republic of Ireland great Roy Keane signs a three-year deal to manage English Championship side Sunderland. Contrary to previous reports, Brian Kidd will not be Keane's assistant; instead, Leicester City coach Tony Loughlan will fill that role. (BBC)

== 27 August 2006 (Sunday) ==
- Baseball: 2006 Little League World Series
  - The scheduled Consolation game between Mexico and Beaverton, Oregon is cancelled due to rain, and both teams will wind up sharing third place. The championship game between Japan and Columbus, Georgia is also rained out but rescheduled for Monday (August 28) at 8 PM US EDT.
- Auto racing
  - Formula One: Brazilian Felipe Massa drives his Ferrari to victory in the Turkish Grand Prix.
- Billiards: The Philippine team of Efren Reyes and Francisco Bustamante defeated the American tandem of Earl Strickland and Rodney Morris at the World Cup of Pool held at Newport, Wales.

== 26 August 2006 (Saturday) ==
- Auto racing
  - NASCAR NEXTEL Cup: The first two positions of the ten available slots for the Chase for the NEXTEL Cup are filled following the Sharpie 500 at Bristol, Tennessee. Jimmie Johnson clinches the first birth as two cars drop out due to mechanical problems, while race winner Matt Kenseth clinches the second spot after winning the race, his fourth win of the season.
- Rugby league: St. Helens win the Powergen Rugby League Challenge Cup beating the Huddersfield Giants 42–12 at Twickenham.

== 25 August 2006 (Friday) ==
- Football – European Super Cup at Stade Louis II, Monaco
  - Barcelona 0 – 3 Sevilla In the all-Spanish match between last seasons' Champions League and UEFA Cup winners, the unfancied Sevilla win the largest victory in the era of the single-match Super Cup.
- Cricket: There is astonishment in the cricketing world when the International Cricket Council publishes an email exchange with umpire Darrell Hair following the unprecedented forfeiture last Sunday of the Fourth Test between England and Pakistan. Hair is revealed to have offered to retire for a payment of US$500,000. The Pakistan team management claims that their position in the umpiring controversy is vindicated. (Times), Sporting Life (1), Sporting Life (2)

== 24 August 2006 (Thursday) ==
- Football – 2006–07 UEFA Cup, Second qualifying round, second leg. Progressing teams shown in **bold**.
  - **Trabzonspor** 1 – 0 APOEL (aggregate: 2–1)
  - Domžale 0 – 3 **Hapoel Tel Aviv** (aggregate: 2–4)
  - Hajduk Rodić M&B Kula 1 – 1 (aet) **CSKA Sofia** (aggregate: 1 – 1, CSKA Sofia won on away goals)
  - **Ethnikos Achna** 5 – 0 Roeselare (aggregate: 6–2)
  - Beitar Jerusalem 1 – 1 **Dinamo Bucharest** (aggregate: 1–2)
  - Maribor 1 – 1 **FK Partizan** (aggregate: 2–3)
  - **Rapid Bucharest** 2 – 0 Sarajevo (aggregate: 2–1)
  - **Lokomotiv Sofia** 4 – 0 Bnei Yehuda Tel Aviv (aggregate: 6–0)
  - **Kayserispor** 3 – 1 Tirana (aggregate: 5–1)
  - Dinamo Minsk 2 – 3 **Artmedia Bratislava** (aggregate: 3–5)
  - **FC Sion** 1 – 0 Ried (aggregate: 1–0)
  - **Grasshoppers** 2 – 0 Videoton (aggregate: 3–1)
  - **Slavia Prague** 0 – 0 Karvan (aggregate: 2–0)
  - Wisła Płock 1 – 1 **Chornomorets Odesa** (aggregate: 1–1, Chornomorets Odesa won on away goals)
  - FC Vaduz 2 – 1 **FC Basel** (aggregate: 2–2, FC Basel won on away goals)
  - **Metalurh Zaporizhzhya** 3 – 0 Zimbru Chişinău (aggregate: 3–0)
  - **Wisła Kraków** 1 – 0 Mattersburg (aggregate: 2–1)
  - Ameri Tbilisi 2 – 2 **Hertha Berlin** (aggregate: 2–3)
  - BATE Borisov 0 – 2 **Rubin Kazan** (aggregate: 0–5)
  - Marseille 3 – 3 BSC Young Boys (aggregate: 3–3, Marseille won on away goals)
  - Drogheda United 1 – 0 (aet) **I.K. Start** (aggregate: 1–1; Start win 11–10 on penalties)
  - Llanelli 1 – 5 **Odense** (aggregate: 1–6)
  - Kaunas 1 – 0 **Randers** (aggregate: 2–3)
  - **Levadia Tallinn** 1 – 0 FC Twente (aggregate: 2–1)
  - **Newcastle United** 0 – 0 Ventspils (aggregate: 1–0)
  - **Åtvidaberg** 1 – 1 Brann (aggregate: 4–4, Åtvidaberg won on away goals)
  - Skonto Riga 1 – 2 **Molde** (aggregate: 1–2)
  - **Brøndby** 4 – 0 Flora Tallinn (aggregate: 4–0)
  - **Club Brugge** 5 – 2 Sūduva (aggregate: 7–2)
  - **Derry City** 2 – 2 Gretna (aggregate: 7–3)
  - **Auxerre** 5 – 1 OFK Beograd (aggregate: 5–2)
  - **Litex Lovech** 2 – 1 Omonia (aggregate:2–1)

== 23 August 2006 (Wednesday) ==
- Football
  - 2006–07 UEFA Champions League, Third Qualifying round, second leg, progressing teams shown in **bold**.
    - **Spartak Moscow** 2 – 1 Slovan Liberec (aggregate: 2–1)
    - Legia Warszawa 2 – 3 **Shakhtar Donetsk** (aggregate: 2–4)
    - Chievo 2 – 2 **Levski Sofia** (aggregate: 2–4)
    - **AEK Athens** 3 – 0 Hearts (aggregate: 5–1)
    - Ružomberok 0 – 2 **CSKA Moscow** (aggregate: 0–5)
    - Mladá Boleslav 1 – 1 **Galatasaray** (aggregate: 3–6)
    - **Steaua Bucharest** 2 – 1 Standard Liège (aggregate: 4–3)
    - Ajax 0 – 2 **FC Copenhagen** (aggregate: 2–3) An own goal sends the four-time UEFA Champions out in a stunning upset.
    - Fenerbahçe 2 – 2 **Dynamo Kyiv** (aggregate: 3–5)
    - Rabotnički Kometal 0 – 2 **Lille** (aggregate: 0–4)
    - **Arsenal** 2 – 1 Dinamo Zagreb (aggregate: 5–1)
  - English football:
    - According to media reports, struggling Championship side Sunderland are set to unveil former Manchester United and Republic of Ireland great Roy Keane as permanent manager. Former Man United assistant manager Brian Kidd will reportedly assume the same role at the Stadium of Light as a mentor to Keane. (BBC)

== 22 August 2006 (Tuesday) ==
- Football – 2006–07 UEFA Champions League, Third Qualifying round, second leg, progressing teams shown in **bold**.
  - **Benfica** 3 – 0 Austria Vienna (aggregate: 4–1)
  - Maccabi Haifa 1 – 1 **Liverpool** (aggregate: 2–3; played at Kyiv, Ukraine)
  - **Valencia** 3 – 0 Red Bull Salzburg (aggregate: 3–1)
  - Crvena Zvezda 1 – 2 **Milan** (aggregate: 1–3)
  - Osasuna 1 – 1 **Hamburg** (aggregate: 1–1, Hamburg win on away goals rule)

== 21 August 2006 (Monday) ==
- Baseball: Cory Lidle throws six shutout innings as the New York Yankees beat the Boston Red Sox, 2–1, to sweep a five-game series in Boston. New York's first five-game sweep at Fenway Park since 1943 gives the Yankees a 6½-game lead in the American League East. (AP via Yahoo)

== 20 August 2006 (Sunday) ==
- Auto racing: NASCAR NEXTEL Cup
  - Matt Kenseth wins the GFS Marketplace 400.
- Football: 2006–07 FA Premier League Opening Games.
  - Manchester United 5 – 1 Fulham: A Premiership record attendance of 75,115 saw the Red Devils handily win their opener.
  - Chelsea 3 – 0 Manchester City
  - The total attendance in the Premiership's opening weekend of 400,135 sets an all-time record for a starting weekend in the Premier League.
- Golf: Tiger Woods wins the 2006 PGA Championship by five strokes over 2003 PGA winner Shaun Micheel. Woods becomes the first golfer in history to win the PGA Championship twice on the same course (Medinah Country Club). His 18-under-par 270 equals the record, set by himself and Bob May in 2000, for lowest 72-hole score to par in the PGA Championship. Woods also becomes the first male golfer to win two major championships in each of two successive years.
- Tennis: Andy Roddick wins his fourth ATP Masters Series title and his second Cincinnati Masters title by beating former World No. 1 Juan Carlos Ferrero.
- Cricket: Pakistan in England, Fourth Test: The Test between England and Pakistan descends into chaos after the Pakistan bowlers are accused of ball tampering. The Pakistan team initially refuse to return to the field after tea in protest of the decision to award England an additional five runs and allow their batsmen to select a new ball. When Pakistan finally agree to resume the game, the match umpires refuse to return to the field believing that Pakistan have forfeited and the match is over. This is the first match in Test cricket history to be forfeited. (BBC)

== 19 August 2006 (Saturday) ==
- Football: 2006–07 FA Premier League Opening Games.
  - Sheffield United 1–1 Liverpool: Rob Hulse scores the first goal of the 2006–07 season, but the defending FA Cup holders force a draw in the Blades' first Premiership match in 12 years.
  - Arsenal 1–1 Aston Villa: Gilberto's 83rd-minute goal saves the Gunners from losing their Premier League debut of Emirates Stadium.
  - Everton 2–1 Watford: The Hornets lose their first Premiership match in five seasons.
  - Newcastle United 2–1 Wigan Athletic
  - Portsmouth 3–0 Blackburn Rovers
  - Reading 3–2 Middlesbrough: The Royals come back from a 2–0 deficit early and win their maiden Premiership match at home over the UEFA Cup runners-up. Dave Kitson scores the first Premiership goal for Reading.
  - West Ham United 3–1 Charlton Athletic
  - Bolton Wanderers 2–0 Tottenham Hotspur
- Rugby union: 2006 Tri Nations Series (Round 6); Bledisloe Cup (Match 3):
  - New Zealand 34–27 Australia
    - The All Blacks go down 20–11 at halftime to the Wallabies at Auckland's Eden Park, but storm back to win. With the win, the All Blacks clinch the 2006 Tri Nations with the South Africa leg remaining (3 more rounds), and also retain the Bledisloe Cup. The win was the All Blacks' 21st in a row undefeated at home. Both sides scored three tries apiece. Before the match, a moment of silence for recently passed Māori Queen, Te Atairangikaahu, was held. (BBC) (Sportal) (New Zealand Herald)
- Major League Baseball: The night game of a day/night doubleheader between the New York Yankees and the Boston Red Sox breaks the Major League Baseball record for the longest 9-inning game, a 14–11 Yankee win lasting 4 hours and 45 minutes. The previous record was 4 hours and 27 minutes, an October 5, 2001 contest between the Los Angeles Dodgers and San Francisco Giants. The day game, a 12–4 Yankee victory, was not a short one either at 3 hours and 55 minutes. (AP/Yahoo!)

== 16 August 2006 (Wednesday) ==
- Cricket: South Africa in Sri Lanka: South Africa abandons the remainder of its tour to Sri Lanka following a series of bomb blasts in the capital, Colombo. South Africa was set to play Sri Lanka and India in the Unitech Cup tournament of one-day internationals. (Article)
- Football: 2008 European Football Championship qualification
  - Group A: Belgium 0 – 0 Kazakhstan
  - Group B: Faroe Islands 0 – 6 Georgia
  - Group E: Estonia 0 – 1 North Macedonia

== 13 August 2006 (Sunday) ==
- Baseball: Cleveland Indians designated hitter Travis Hafner hits his sixth grand slam of the season in a 13–0 win over the Kansas City Royals. Hafner ties the record for grand slams in a season set by Don Mattingly in 1987 (AP via Yahoo)
- Football: FA Community Shield at Millennium Stadium, Cardiff
  - Liverpool 2 – 1 Chelsea
- Auto racing: Kevin Harvick wins the NEXTEL Cup AMD at The Glen.

== 10 August 2006 (Thursday) ==
- Football:
  - 2006–07 UEFA Cup, Second qualifying round, first leg.
    - APOEL 1 – 1 Trabzonspor
    - Hapoel Tel Aviv 1 – 2 Domžale (played at Tilburg, The Netherlands)
    - CSKA Sofia 0 – 0 Hajduk Rodić M&B Kula
    - Roeselare 2 – 1 Ethnikos Achna
    - Dinamo Bucharest 1 – 0 Beitar Jerusalem
    - FK Partizan 2 – 1 Maribor
    - Sarajevo 1 – 0 Rapid Bucharest
    - Bnei Yehuda Tel Aviv 0 – 2 Lokomotiv Sofia (played at Senec, Slovakia)
    - Tirana 0 – 2 Kayserispor
    - Artmedia Bratislava 2 – 1 Dinamo Minsk
    - Ried 0 – 0 FC Sion
    - Videoton 1 – 1 Grasshoppers
    - Karvan 0 – 2 Slavia Prague
    - Chornomorets Odesa 0 – 0 Wisła Płock
    - FC Basel 1 – 0 FC Vaduz
    - Zimbru Chişinău 0 – 0 Metalurh Zaporizhzhya
    - Mattersburg 1 – 1 Wisła Kraków
    - Hertha Berlin 1 – 0 Ameri Tbilisi
    - Rubin Kazan 3 – 0 BATE Borisov
    - BSC Young Boys 3 – 3 Marseille
    - I.K. Start 1 – 0 Drogheda United
    - Odense 1 – 0 Llanelli
    - Randers 3 – 1 Kaunas
    - FC Twente 1 – 1 Levadia Tallinn
    - Ventspils 0 – 1 Newcastle United
    - Brann 3 – 3 Åtvidaberg
    - Molde 0 – 0 Skonto Riga
    - Flora Tallinn 0 – 0 Brøndby
    - Sūduva 0 – 2 Club Brugge
    - Gretna 1 – 5 Derry City
  - Zlatan Ibrahimović becomes the latest star to exit Juventus in the wake of their forced relegation due to the 2006 Serie A scandal. Juve sells him to Inter Milan for a reported €24.8 million (US$32 million).
  - New England manager Steve McClaren announces that Chelsea star John Terry will be the team's new captain, with Steven Gerrard of Liverpool as vice-captain. (The FA)

== 9 August 2006 (Wednesday) ==
- Football – 2006–07 UEFA Champions League, Third Qualifying round, first leg
  - Slovan Liberec 0 – 0 Spartak Moscow
  - Shakhtar Donetsk 1 – 0 Legia Warszawa
  - Red Bull Salzburg 1 – 0 Valencia
  - Levski Sofia 2 – 0 Chievo
  - Hearts 1 – 2 AEK Athens
  - CSKA Moscow 3 – 0 Ružomberok
  - Milan 1 – 0 Crvena Zvezda
  - Galatasaray 5 – 2 Mladá Boleslav
  - Standard Liège 2 – 2 Steaua Bucharest
  - FC København 1 – 2 Ajax
  - Hamburg 0 – 0 Osasuna
  - Dynamo Kyiv 3 – 1 Fenerbahçe
  - Liverpool 2 – 1 Maccabi Haifa
  - Lille 3 – 0 Rabotnički Kometal

== 8 August 2006 (Tuesday) ==
- Cricket:
  - Pakistan in England:
    - Third Test at Headingley, Leeds: England defeats Pakistan by 167 runs to lead the four-Test series 2–0. Pakistan's loss came despite a 363-run partnership between Mohammad Yousuf (192) and Younis Khan (173), a new Test partnership record for Pakistan v. England (Scorecard)
  - South Africa in Sri Lanka:
    - Second Test at Colombo (PSS): Sri Lanka completes a clean-sweep of the two-Test series against South Africa after a one-wicket victory over the visitors in Colombo. (Scorecard)
- NFL: Roger Goodell is elected to succeed Paul Tagliabue as the league's fifth commissioner.
- Football (soccer):
  - 2006–07 UEFA Champions League, Third Qualifying round, first leg
    - Dinamo Zagreb 0 – 3 Arsenal
    - Austria Vienna 1 – 1 Benfica (UEFA.com)
  - 2006–07 UEFA Cup, Second qualifying round, first leg.
    - OFK Beograd 1 – 0 Auxerre
    - Omonia 0 – 0 Litex Lovech (UEFA.com)
- Rugby union: 2007 Super 14 season, 2006 Currie Cup
  - The High Court of South Africa have ruled in favour of including the Southern Spears in next year's Super 14 and this year's Currie Cup, meaning they will replace the now relegated Cats in the former competition, pending an appeal from either the South African Rugby Union or its commercial arm, SA Rugby. The Spears were originally guaranteed a place in the 2007 and 2008 Super 14 seasons, but SA Rugby overruled that decision, leading to the Spears taking the SARU and SA Rugby to court.(Sydney Morning Herald)(Pretoria News)(IOL)

== 7 August 2006 (Monday) ==
- Cricket: Former Australian cricketer Dean Jones calls Muslim cricketer Hashim Amla a "terrorist", leading to Jones sacking from his commentating position.(Cricinfo)

== 6 August 2006 (Sunday) ==
- NFL Pre-season:
  - Hall of Fame Game at Canton, Ohio: Oakland Raiders 16, Philadelphia Eagles 10. In front of a crowd that featured former Raiders coach and new Hall of Fame inductee John Madden, Art Shell is successful in his first game back as Raiders head coach after having been fired in 1994, with the help of three Sebastian Janikowski field goals.
- Auto racing:
  - NASCAR NEXTEL Cup: Jimmie Johnson wins the Allstate 400 at The Brickyard for his 22nd career victory.
  - Formula One: Jenson Button wins his first F1 race (his 113th start), the Hungarian Grand Prix.
- Golf:
  - PGA: Tiger Woods shoots his fourth straight round of 66, winning the Buick Open by three strokes over Jim Furyk for his 50th career victory.
  - LPGA/LET/LGU: Sherri Steinhauer wins her third Women's British Open by three strokes for her second major title (the British Open was not recognized by the LPGA as a women's major until 2001).
- Basketball: The first round of eliminations in the men's basketball tournament of the University Athletics Association of the Philippines ends with the Ateneo Blue Eagles beating the UST Growling Tigers, 114–78. Ateneo finished the first round undefeated, with a 6–0 win–loss record. Season host UE Red Warriors are at second place with 4–2, followed by the Adamson Soaring Falcons at 3–3. Four teams are tied for the fourth spot, all with 2–4 records: the defending champions FEU Tamaraws, the UP Fighting Maroons, the NU Bulldogs and the UST Growling Tigers. UBelt.com

== 5 August 2006 (Saturday) ==
- Rugby union: 2006 Tri Nations Series
  - Australia 20–18 South Africa
    - Australia regain the Mandela Challenge Plate.
      - A late try to substitute Mat Rogers and its subsequent conversion by center Stirling Mortlock near the touchline was enough for Australia to defeat the Springboks. The Springboks' are now 9 points behind Australia and 12 behind New Zealand.(Sporting Life)
- Cycling: Floyd Landis' B sample returns a positive test for excessive testosterone, and his contract with the Phonak racing team is immediately terminated. It is now possible that Landis will be stripped of his victory in the 2006 Tour de France and will receive a two-year ban from the sport. (IOL)
- NFL: Reggie White, Troy Aikman, Warren Moon, John Madden, Rayfield Wright, and Harry Carson are inducted into the Pro Football Hall of Fame in Canton, Ohio.

== 4 August 2006 (Friday) ==
- Baseball: Phillies second baseman Chase Utley's hitting streak ends at 35 games as he goes 0-for-5, but the Phillies win 5–3 over the New York Mets at Shea Stadium. (ABC America)

== 2 August 2006 (Wednesday) ==
- Football: 2006–07 UEFA Champions League, Second Qualifying Round, second leg. Progressing teams shown in **bold**.
  - **Steaua Bucharest** 3 – 0 ND Gorica (Aggregate: 5–0)
  - Sioni Bolnisi 0 – 2 **Levski Sofia** (Aggregate: 0–4)
  - **Red Bull Salzburg** 2 – 0 FC Zürich (Aggregate: 3–2)
  - **Ružomberok** 3 – 1 Djurgården (Aggregate: 3–2)
  - **FK Rabotnički** 4 – 1 Debrecen (Aggregate: 5–2)
  - **FK Crvena Zvezda** 3 – 0 Cork City (Aggregate: 4–0)
  - **Mladá Boleslav** 2 – 2 Vålerenga (Aggregate: 5–3)
  - **Spartak Moscow** 0 – 0 Sheriff Tiraspol (Aggregate: 1–1)
  - **Dynamo Kyiv** 4 – 0 Liepājas Metalurgs (Aggregate: 8–1)
  - **Legia Warszawa** 2 – 0 FH Hafnarfjörður (Aggregate: 3–0)
  - MyPa 2 – 2 **FC København** (Aggregate: 4–2)
  - **Dinamo Zagreb** 5 – 2 Ekranas (Aggregate: 9–3)
  - Široki Brijeg 0 – 0 **Hearts** (Aggregate: 0–3) (UEFA.com)

== 1 August 2006 (Tuesday) ==
- Football: 2006–07 UEFA Champions League, Second Qualifying Round, second leg. Progressing team shown in **bold**.
  - B36 Tórshavn 0 – 5 **Fenerbahçe** (Aggregate: 0–9)
