= July 2006 in sports =

| << | July 2006 | | | | | >> |
| Su | Mo | Tu | We | Th | Fr | Sa |
| | | | | | | 1 |
| 2 | 3 | 4 | 5 | 6 | 7 | 8 |
| 9 | 10 | 11 | 12 | 13 | 14 | 15 |
| 16 | 17 | 18 | 19 | 20 | 21 | 22 |
| 23 | 24 | 25 | 26 | 27 | 28 | 29 |
| 30 | 31 |
India; Sports

This list shows notable sports-related deaths, events, and notable outcomes that occurred in July of 2006.

== Deaths ==
- 30 Al Balding
- 1 Fred Trueman

== Sporting seasons ==
- Auto racing 2006:
  - Formula One; GP2; BTCC
  - Indy Racing League
  - NASCAR; Busch; Craftsman Truck
  - World Rally Championship
- Basketball: 2006 college basketball season in the Philippines:
  - NCAA Season 82
  - UAAP Season 69
- Cricket 2006: England
- Football 2006–07:
  - 2006–07 UEFA Champions League
  - 2006–07 UEFA Cup
- Rugby union 2006:
  - 2006 Air New Zealand Cup
  - 2006 Currie Cup
  - 2006 North America 4
- U.S. and Canadian sports 2005–06:
  - 2006 MLB season
  - 2006 CFL season

== Days of the month ==
=== 31 July 2006 (Monday) ===
- Baseball: The Chicago Cubs trade four-time Cy Young Award winner Greg Maddux to the Los Angeles Dodgers for middle-infielder César Izturis. (AP via Yahoo)
- Cricket: South Africa in Sri Lanka
  - First Test at Colombo (SSCG): Sri Lanka defeats South Africa by an innings and 153 runs. South Africa, led by Ashwell Prince, batted first after winning the toss, compiling 169 before being dismissed on the first-day tea break. Sri Lanka lost two early wickets before a record-breaking 624 run partnership between Kumar Sangakkara (287) and captain Mahela Jayawardene (374; 26 runs short of Brian Lara's world-record individual score of 400). This partnership was particularly savage on spinner Nicky Boje, who ended with bowling figures of 0/221 from 65 overs. Sri Lanka were able to declare their innings closed at 756/5, leaving South Africa needing 587 runs just to make the home side bat again. Despite an opening partnership of 165, and solid performances in the middle order, Muttiah Muralitharan's 6/131 restricted South Africa to 434. Sri Lanka leads to two-Test series 1–0. (Scorecard)

=== 30 July 2006 (Sunday) ===
- Baseball: The New York Yankees acquire All-Star right fielder Bobby Abreu and starting pitcher Cory Lidle from the Philadelphia Phillies for relief pitcher Matt Smith and three minor-league prospects.
- American football: Heisman Trophy winner Reggie Bush agrees to a six-year contract with the New Orleans Saints. (AP via Yahoo)

=== 29 July 2006 (Saturday) ===
- Baseball: Tampa Bay Devil Rays third baseman Tomás Pérez ties a major-league record by hitting four doubles in the Devil Rays' 19–6 blowout of the New York Yankees. Perez, who goes 5-for-5, is the first Devil Rays player to hit four doubles in a game. (AP via Yahoo)
- Cricket: Pakistan in England:
  - Second Test at Old Trafford, Manchester: England defeats Pakistan by an innings and 120 runs. Pakistan's decision to bat first after winning the toss proved disastrous, as the visitors were dismissed for a meagre 119 in their first innings, English fast bowler Steve Harmison claiming 6/19. England's reply of 461/9 declared centred on centuries to Alastair Cook (127) and Ian Bell (106 not out). Player-of-the-match Harmison (5/57) and Monty Panesar (5/72) combined to dismiss Pakistan for 222 in its second innings. England leads the four-Test series 1–0. (Scorecard)
- Rugby union:
  - 2006 Tri Nations Series; round 4 at Suncorp Stadium, Brisbane, Australia.
    - Australia 9–13 New Zealand
      - The All Blacks brush aside criticism earlier in the week about their Kapa O Pango haka, retaining the Bledisloe Cup for the third year in succession and picking up 4 Tri Nations points. All Black winger Joe Rokocoko scored the match's only try, and a second half drop goal to Dan Carter gave the All Blacks enough breathing space in a tight match. Stirling Mortlock kicked 3 penalties for Australia.
  - 2006 North America 4: Championship Final
    - Canada West defeats United States Falcons 30–21 to win inaugural tournament in Columbus, Ohio.
      - An intercept try to West's centre Akio Tyler on 60' seals the match.(NA4)
  - 2006 Air New Zealand Cup: Round 1
    - Pool A: Manawatu 10–41 Auckland

=== 28 July 2006 (Friday) ===
- Baseball: The Milwaukee Brewers trade All-Star outfielder Carlos Lee to the Texas Rangers for relief pitcher Francisco Cordero and outfielders Kevin Mench and Laynce Nix.
- American football: Willie Roaf, the Kansas City Chiefs' 11-time Pro Bowl offensive tackle, announces his retirement. (AP via Yahoo)
- Basketball: The first round of eliminations in the men's basketball tournament of the Philippine NCAA ends with the San Beda Red Lions beating the defending champion Letran Knights, 57–49. Both the Red Lions and the Knights finished with a 6 win-1 loss record, while the PCU Dolphins are third with 5–2, and the Mapúa Cardinals are fourth with 4–3. Rounding out the competition are the San Sebastian Stags (3–4), the UPHSD Altas (2–5) and the season host St. Benilde Blazers and JRU Heavy Bombers (both 1–6). UBelt.com
- Rugby union:
  - 2006 Kapa O Pango controversy
    - In reply, All Blacks' coach, Graham Henry, today said that Australians should look at their own society and background, before criticising other countries.(NewstalkZB)
  - 2006 Air New Zealand Cup: Round One
    - Pool B: Hawke's Bay 0– 45 Canterbury in Napier, New Zealand.

=== 27 July 2006 (Thursday) ===
- Rugby union: 2006 Kapa O Pango controversy
  - Australian Wallabies coach, John Connolly, calls for the Kapa O Pango haka of the New Zealand All Blacks to be banned, stating that the throat-slitting action at the end is a bad example. "Young sportsmen these days copy the Wallabies, they copy the All Blacks, and I'd hate to think it led to a tragic consequence somewhere down the road" Connolly said.(TheAge)
- Cycling: 2006 Tour de France winner Floyd Landis tests positive for a banned substance, testosterone, given after Stage 16 of the race. (BBC), (VeloNews)
- American football: Pro Bowl center LeCharles Bentley, whom the Cleveland Browns had signed to anchor their offensive line, tears a tendon in his knee and is out for the entire 2006 season. (AP via Yahoo)
- Football (soccer): 2006–07 UEFA Cup: First Qualifying Round, second leg. Progressing teams shown in **bold**.
  - (Albania) **SK Tirana** 2 – 0 NK Varteks (Croatia) (aggregate: 3–1)
  - (Bulgaria) **CSKA Sofia** 4 – 1 Dinamo Tirana (Albania) (aggregate: 5–1)
  - (Bulgaria) **Litex Lovech** 5 – 0 FC Koper (Slovenia) (aggregate: 6–0)
  - (Andorra) FC Rànger's 0 – 2 **FK Sarajevo** (Bosnia and Herzegovina) (aggregate: 0–5)
  - (Slovenia) **NK Domžale** 5 – 0 HNK Orašje (Bosnia and Herzegovina) (aggregate: 7–0)
  - (Romania) **Dinamo Bucharest** 5 – 1 Hibernians (Malta) (aggregate: 9–1)
  - (San Marino) Murata 0 – 4 **APOEL F.C.** (Greece) (aggregate: 1–7)
  - (Cyprus) **Omonia** 2 – 1 Rijeka (Croatia) (aggregate: 4–3)
  - (North Macedonia) Makedonija Gorce Petrov 1 – 1 **Lokomotiv Sofia** (Bulgaria) (aggregate: 1–3)
  - (Belgium) **K.S.V. Roeselare** 5 – 1 FK Vardar (North Macedonia) (aggregate: 7–2)
  - (Malta) Sliema Wanderers 0 – 1 **Rapid Bucharest** (Romania) (aggregate: 0–6)
  - (Liechtenstein) **FC Vaduz** 0 – 1 Újpest FC (Hungary) (aggregate: 4–1)
  - (Azerbaijan) Karabakh 1 – 2 **Zimbru Chişinău** (Moldova) (aggregate 2–3 a.e.t.)
  - (Switzerland) **BSC Young Boys** 1 – 0 FC Mika (Armenia) (aggregate: 4–1)
  - (Kazakhstan) Kairat Almaty 2 – 1 **Videoton** (Hungary) (aggregate: 2–2)
  - (Belarus) **Dinamo Minsk** 0 – 0 Zagłębie Lubin (Poland) (aggregate: 1–1)
  - (Slovakia) Spartak Trnava 0 – 1 **Karvan** (Azerbaijan) (aggregate: 0–2)
  - (Armenia) FC Banants 1 – 2 **Ameri Tbilisi** (Georgia (country)) (aggregate: 2–2)
  - (Moldova) Nistru Otaci 0 – 1 **BATE Borisov** (Belarus) (aggregate: 0–3)
  - (Kazakhstan) FC Tobol 0 – 0 **FC Basel** (Switzerland) (aggregate: 1–3)
  - (Georgia (country)) WIT Georgia 2 – 1 **Artmedia Bratislava** (Slovakia) (aggregate: 2–3)
  - (Republic of Ireland) **Drogheda United** 3 – 1 HJK Helsinki (Finland) (aggregate: 4–2, a.e.t.)
  - (Iceland) Valur 0 – 0 **Brøndby** (Denmark) (aggregate: 1–3)
  - (Wales) **Llanelli** 0 – 0 Gefle IF (Sweden) (aggregate: 2–1)
  - (Latvia) **Skonto** 3 – 0 Jeunesse Esch (Luxembourg) (aggregate: 5–0)
  - (Luxembourg) Etzella Ettelbruck 0 – 3 **Åtvidabergs FF** (Sweden) (aggregate: 0–7)
  - (Faroe Islands) GÍ Gøta 0 – 2 **Ventspils** (Latvia) (aggregate: 1–4)
  - (Norway) **S.K. Brann** 1 – 0 Glentoran (Northern Ireland) (aggregate: 2–0)
  - (Iceland) ÍA Akranes 2 – 1 **Randers FC** (Denmark) (aggregate: 2–2)
  - (Lithuania) **Kaunas** 1 – 0 Portadown (Northern Ireland) (aggregate: 4–1)
  - (Lithuania) **Sūduva** 2 – 1 Rhyl (Wales) (aggregate: 2–1)
  - (Finland) FC Haka 1 – 0 **Levadia Tallinn** (Estonia) (aggregate: 1–2)
  - (Norway) **I.K. Start** 3 – 0 Skála ÍF (Faroe Islands) (aggregate: 4–0)
  - (Estonia) **Flora Tallinn** 0 – 0 Lyn Oslo (Norway) (aggregate: 1–1)
  - (Republic of Ireland) **Derry City** 1 – 0 IFK Göteborg (Sweden) (aggregate: 2–0)

=== 26 July 2006 (Wednesday) ===
- The United States Olympic Committee (USOC) eliminates Philadelphia and Houston as potential candidates for the 2016 Summer Olympics. Los Angeles, Chicago and San Francisco are the three remaining candidates from the United States for endorsement by the USOC. Philadelphia Daily News
- Football:
  - 2006–07 UEFA Champions League, Second Qualifying Round, first leg
    - ND Gorica 0 – 2 Steaua Bucharest
    - Levski Sofia 2 – 0 Sioni Bolnisi
    - FC Zürich 2 – 1 Red Bull Salzburg
    - Djurgården 1 – 0 Ružomberok
    - Debrecen 1 – 1 FK Rabotnički
    - Cork City 0 – 1 FK Crvena Zvezda
    - Fenerbahçe 4 – 0 B36 Tórshavn
    - Mladá Boleslav 3 – 1 Vålerenga
    - Sheriff Tiraspol 1 – 1 Spartak Moscow
    - Liepājas Metalurgs 1 – 4 Dynamo Kyiv
    - FH Hafnarfjörður 0 – 1 Legia Warszawa
    - FC København 2 – 0 MyPa
    - Hearts 3 – 0 Široki Brijeg (UEFA.com)
  - FC Barcelona President Joan Laporta and the entire Board are forced to stand down following a judge's ruling that new elections must be held, following complaints of irregularities in the application of club regulations made by club members (socios). Laporta has announced that he will stand for re-election in September. (BBC)

=== 25 July 2006 (Tuesday) ===
- Football:
  - 2006–07 UEFA Champions League, Second Qualifying Round, first leg
    - Ekranas 1 – 4 Dinamo Zagreb (UEFA.com)
  - 2006 Serie A scandal: On appeal, all four clubs convicted by a sports tribunal have their punishments reduced. (BBC)
    - Juventus: Relegation to Serie B stands. Points penalty for 2006–07 cut from 30 points to 17. They still lose their 2004–05 and 2005–06 Serie A titles, and are handed a three-match stadium ban. Juventus says that they will sue to stay in Serie A.
    - A.C. Milan: Points penalty for 2005–06 reduced from 44 to 30 points, and will now enter the third qualifying round of the Champions League. Points penalty for 2006–07 Serie A season cut from 15 to 8, and Milan receive a one-match stadium ban.
    - Fiorentina: Restored to Serie A, but with a 19-point deduction for 2006–07 instead of 11. They remain out of the Champions League, and receive a two-match stadium ban.
    - Lazio: Restored to Serie A, but with an 11-point deduction for 2006–07 instead of 7. They remain out of the UEFA Cup, and also receive a two-match stadium ban.
    - The final UEFA access list is confirmed. Inter Milan and Roma enter the group stage of the Champions League. Chievo will join A.C. Milan entering the Champions League at the third qualifying round. Palermo, Livorno and Parma enter the UEFA Cup, all pending UEFA approval at a meeting Thursday (27 July).

=== 23 July 2006 (Sunday) ===
- Cycling: 2006 Tour de France – Stage 20: Sceaux – Antony – Paris-Champs-Élysées (154.5 km)
  - Winner of the Prologue, Norway's Thor Hushovd (C.A) wins the final stage in 3:56:52, narrowly beating Australia's Robbie McEwen (DVL) who misjudged the final sprint, Stuart O'Grady (CSC), Erik Zabel (MRM), and Luca Paolini (LIQ). Overall, in the GC, American Floyd Landis (PHO) wins the race in 89:39:30, followed by Óscar Pereiro (CEI) (+0:57), Andreas Klöden (TMO) (+1:29), Carlos Sastre (CSC) (+3:13), and Cadel Evans (Davitamon) (+5:08). The Prologue to the 2007 Tour de France will take place in London on 7 July 2007. (leTour.fr)
- Auto racing: NASCAR NEXTEL Cup Pennsylvania 500
  - Denny Hamlin completes the clean sweep of Pocono Raceway double by winning from the pole.
- Golf: 2006 British Open
  - Tiger Woods lifts the Claret Jug for the second straight year, becoming the first golfer to do so since Tom Watson in 1983. His 5-under-par 67 puts him at 18 under, two shots ahead of second-place Chris DiMarco and one shot off Woods' record-setting 19-under at St Andrews in 2000. (BBC)

=== 22 July 2006 (Saturday) ===
- Cycling: 2006 Tour de France – Stage 19: Le Creusot – Montceau-les-Mines (individual time trial) (56.0 km)
  - Serhiy Honchar (TMO) proves to be the best in the time trial as he wins this stage just like he had won the earlier timetrial in this tour. His teammate Andreas Klöden (TMO) is second (+0:41) and Floyd Landis (PHO) third (+1:11). Landis is the new yellow jersey as Óscar Pereiro (CEI) loses his 30-second lead with a fourth place in the stage, 2:40 behind Honchar. (leTour.fr)
- Rugby union: 2006 Tri Nations Series – Round 3: New Zealand 35–17 South Africa at Westpac Stadium, Wellington, New Zealand.
  - With both sides scoring two tries each, the match was won for the All Blacks on Dan Carter's boot, kicking 9 from 9. The Springboks improved greatly from their 49–0 loss to Australia, with Fourie Du Preez scoring the first try in under 30 seconds, and were in the match, until New Zealand captain, Richie McCaw, scored a try in the final ten minutes.
- Rink Hockey: 2006 Rink Hockey European Championship, Monza, Italy.
  - Final:
    - **Spain** 2–0 Switzerland
  - 3rd Place Game
    - Italy 4–5 **Portugal**
  - 5th to 9th:
    - **England** 3–2 Andorra
    - Austria 0–8 **France**
    - **Germany** 1–0 Andorra
    - Austria 4–10 **England**
- Cricket
  - Goldsborough 2nd XI set a new world record for the worst cricket score in a league match when they were all out in 10 ducks. They managed a score of 5 from assorted byes. (The Times)

=== 21 July 2006 (Friday) ===
- Cycling: 2006 Tour de France – Stage 18: Morzine – Mâcon (197.0 km)
  - Matteo Tosatto (QSI) leads the race to Mâcon in 4:16:15, just ahead of Cristian Moreni (COF), Ronny Scholz (GST) (+0:02), Manuel Quinziato (LIQ) (+0:47), and Sébastien Hinault (C.A) (+1:03). In the GC Óscar Pereiro (CEI) retains the yellow jersey as leader of the general classification' in 84:33:04, followed by Carlos Sastre (CSC) (+0:12), Floyd Landis (PHO) (+0:30), Andreas Klöden (TMO) (+2:29), and Cadel Evans (Davitamon) (+3:08). Michael Rasmussen (RAB) is confirmed as the winner of the **King of the Mountains** competition, while Robbie McEwen (DVL) is in an unassailable position in the **points competition**. (leTour.fr)
- Basketball: The Purefoods Chunkee Giants defeated the Red Bull Barako at the Philippine Basketball Association Finals best-of-seven series, 4–2, at the Araneta Coliseum.
- Rink Hockey: 2006 Rink Hockey European Championship, Monza, Italy.
  - Semifinals:
    - **Spain** 5–1 Portugal
    - Italy 3–5 **Switzerland**
  - 5th to 9th:
    - **France** 2–0 Germany
    - **Andorra** 9–3 Austria
    - **England** 2–1 Germany
    - Andorra 2–3 **France**

=== 20 July 2006 (Thursday) ===
- Baseball: The grand jury investigating slugger Barry Bonds expired today after announcing that he would not be indicted at this time. The U.S. Attorney's office would neither confirm nor deny that a new grand jury will convene next week with the possibility of charging him with tax evasion and perjury later. (USAToday)
- Cycling: 2006 Tour de France – Stage 17: Saint-Jean-de-Maurienne – Morzine (mountain stage) (199.0 km)
  - American Floyd Landis (PHO) recovers from a devastating Stage 16 finish to win Stage 17 in 5:23:36, 5:42 ahead of Carlos Sastre (CSC). With his first stage victory of the race, Landis is now in third overall, just 33 seconds behind Óscar Pereiro (CEI), who retained the yellow jersey with an overall time of 80:08:49. Sastre is still second overall (+0:12).
- Football: Under-19 European Championship, First Round
  - Poland 4 – 1 Belgium The Hosts bounce back from their 1–0 loss to Austria and a hattrick from Dawid Janczyk sets them on the road to a 4–1 victory.
  - Austria 1 – 3 Czech Republic The Czechs also win after losing their first match. With one match to go in Group A, all teams are equal on points.
  - Turkey 4 – 4 Portugal A last minute equaliser gives Turkey their first point of the tournament.
  - Spain 4 – 0 Scotland Spain qualifies already as they also win their second match. Scotland is not out of it yet as they are just one point behind Portugal who are in second.
- Rink Hockey: 2006 Rink Hockey European Championship, Monza, Italy. Quarter-finals:
  - France 3–4 **Switzerland**
  - **Spain** 10–0 Germany
  - **Italy** 11–1 Andorra
  - **Portugal** 24–0 Austria

=== 19 July 2006 (Wednesday) ===
- Cycling: 2006 Tour de France – Stage 16: Bourg-d'Oisans – La Toussuire (mountain stage) (182.0 km)
  - Maillot a pois rouge leader Michael Rasmussen (RAB) wins the stage in 5:36:04, followed by Carlos Sastre (CSC) (+1:41), Óscar Pereiro (CEI) (+1:54), Cadel Evans (Davitamon) (+1:56), and Andreas Klöden (TMO) (+1:56). In the General classification Óscar Pereiro (CEI) regains theyellow jersey in 74:38:05, followed by Sastre (+1:50), Klöden (+2:29), Cyril Dessel (AG2R) +2:43, and Evans (+2:56). (leTour.fr)
- 2006–07 UEFA Champions League: First Qualifying Round, second leg. Progressing teams shown in **bold**.
  - **ND Gorica** 2 – 2 Linfield (aggregate: 5–3)
  - **FH Hafnarfjörður** 1 – 1 TVMK Tallinn (aggregate: 4–3)
  - **B36 Tórshavn** 2 – 2 Birkirkara (aggregate: 5–2)
  - Apollon Limassol 1 – 1 **Cork City** (aggregate: 1–2)
  - Aktobe-Lento 1 – 1 **Liepājas Metalurgs** (aggregate: 1–2)
  - **Široki Brijeg** 1 – 0 Shakhtyor Soligorsk (aggregate: 2–0)
  - The New Saints 0 – 1 **MyPa** (aggregate: 0–2)
- Carlos Alberto Parreira quits his position as coach for Brazil as announced by the Brazilian Football Confederation.
- The Kansas City Wizards fire Bob Gansler, the longest tenured coach in Major League Soccer history. Brian Bliss named as interim coach. (Sports Illustrated)
- Rink Hockey: 2006 Rink Hockey European Championship, Monza, Italy. Third day:
  - France 2–4 Spain
  - Italy 4–0 Austria
  - Switzerland 4–2 Andorra

=== 18 July 2006 (Tuesday) ===
- Cycling: 2006 Tour de France – Stage 15: Gap – Alpe d'Huez (mountain stage) (187.0 km)
  - The fearsome climb to Alpe d'Huez is won by Fränk Schleck (CSC) in 4:52:22, followed by Damiano Cunego (LAM) (+0:11), Stefano Garzelli (LIQ) (+1:10), Floyd Landis (PHO) (+1:10) and Andreas Klöden (TMO) (+1:10). In the GC Landis regains the yellow jersey in 69:00:05, ten seconds ahead of Óscar Pereiro (CEI), Cyril Dessel (AG2R) +2:02, Denis Menchov (RAB) +2:12, and Carlos Sastre (CSC) +2:17. (leTour.fr)
- Football: 2006–07 UEFA Champions League: First Qualifying Round, second leg. Progressing teams shown in **bold**.
  - **Sheriff Tiraspol** 2 – 0 Pyunik (aggregate: 2–0)
  - Baku 1 – 0 **Sioni Bolnisi** (aggregate: 1–2)
  - **FK Rabotnički** 0 – 0 F91 Dudelange (aggregate: 1–0)
  - **Ekranas** 3 – 0 Elbasani (aggregate: 3–1)
- Football: Under-19 European Championship, First Round
  - Poland 0 – 1 Austria The hosts suffered a defeat as Austria scored 15 minutes from time to take the three points.
  - Belgium 4 – 2 Czech Republic Also in the same group of Poland and Austria, Belgium proved to be too strong for the Czech Republic as they won 4–2.
  - Scotland 2 – 2 Portugal Scotland and Portugal together scored four times and drew to split the points.
  - Spain 5 – 3 Turkey However Spain and Turkey managed to score 8 goals between them, with Spain taking the victory in this high scoring game.
- Rink Hockey: 2006 Rink Hockey European Championship, Monza, Italy. Second day:
  - England 0–5 France
  - Austria 3–5 Germany
  - Portugal 7–0 Switzerland

=== 17 July 2006 (Monday) ===
- Cricket: Pakistan in England:
  - First Test at Lord's, London: England and Pakistan draw the First Test at Lord's. Having won the toss and electing to bat, England declared their first innings closed at 528/9, Paul Collingwood (186), Alastair Cook (105) and Ian Bell (100 not out) scoring centuries. Pakistan lost four wickets early before a series of partnerships between Mohammad Yousuf (202) and various middle-order batsmen guided the visitors to a respectable 445 all out. England's second innings of 296/8 declared centred on captain Andrew Strauss' 128. Pakistan (214/4) batted through the final day to draw the match. (Scorecard)
- Major League Baseball: Chipper Jones goes 3-for-5 but fails to extend his record-tying streak of consecutive games with an extra-base hit in the Atlanta Braves' 15–3 win over the St. Louis Cardinals. (AP via Yahoo)
- Cycling: 2006 Tour de France – Rest day
- Football: Colombian president Álvaro Uribe announces that his country is preparing a bid to host the 2014 FIFA World Cup. Brazil had previously been viewed as a shoo-in as hosts. (Sky Sports)
- Rink Hockey: European Championship 2006, Monza, Italy. First day:
  - Spain 8–0 England
  - Italy 7–1 Germany
  - Portugal 3–0 Andorra

=== 16 July 2006 (Sunday) ===
- Auto racing
  - NASCAR: Kyle Busch earns his first NEXTEL Cup win of 2006, winning the Lenox Industrial Tools 300 at New Hampshire International Speedway.
  - Formula One: Michael Schumacher spoils a Renault party in France driving his Ferrari to victory in the French Grand Prix for a record eighth time.
- National Football League: Dallas Cowboys safety Keith Davis is shot twice while driving in Dallas. He is not seriously hurt. (AP via Yahoo)
- Major League Baseball
  - Atlanta Braves third baseman Chipper Jones ties a 79-year-old major-league record by hitting an extra-base hit in his 14th straight game. Jones homered in the Braves' 10–5 win over the San Diego Padres.
  - The New York Mets hit two grand slam homers, one by Cliff Floyd and the other by Carlos Beltrán, and David Wright adds a two-run homer of his own in a team-record 11-run sixth inning as the Mets beat the Chicago Cubs 13–7. It marked the first time that two grand slams were hit in the same inning since Fernando Tatís of the St. Louis Cardinals hit two in the third inning against the Los Angeles Dodgers at Dodger Stadium on April 23, 1999.
- Cycling: 2006 Tour de France – Stage 14: Montélimar – Gap (180.5 km)
  - Pierrick Fédrigo (BTL) wins the stage in 4:14:23, followed by Salvatore Commesso (LAM) (+0.00), Christian Vande Velde (CSC) (+0.03), Christophe Moreau (AG2R) (+0.07), Georg Totschnig (GST) (+0.07). A crash involving three of the six-man breakaway about 20 minutes from the end of the stage results in a broken leg for Rik Verbrugghe (COF) and a broken collarbone for David Cañada (SDV). Positions in the GC remain unchanged, Óscar Pereiro (CEI) leads in 64:05:04, ahead of Floyd Landis (PHO) +1:29, Cyril Dessel (AG2R) +1:37, Denis Menchov (RAB) +2:30, and Cadel Evans (Davitamon) +2:46. (leTour.fr)
- Tennis: The 2006 Fed Cup semifinals featured their second and final day, with Italy booking a place in the final through a victory from Flavia Pennetta over Lourdes Domínguez Lino which gave them the necessary third victory. Belgium defeated the US, 4–1, and will face the Italians in the final.
  - Spain 1–3 Italy:
    - (Spain) Anabel Medina Garrigues beats (Italy) Francesca Schiavone 6–2 6–2.
    - (Italy) Flavia Pennetta beats (Spain) Lourdes Domínguez Lino 6–2 6–4.
    - The remaining doubles match was not played as the match was of no importance anymore and neither team wanted to play.
  - Belgium 4–1 United States:
    - (Belgium) Kim Clijsters beats (United States) Vania King 6–0 6–1.
    - (Belgium) Kirsten Flipkens is behind 2–6 3–1 against (United States) Mashona Washington when the American retires with a leg injury.
    - (United States) Jill Craybas and Vania King beat (Belgium) Leslie Butkiewicz and Caroline Maes 6–1 6–2.

=== 15 July 2006 (Saturday) ===
- Cycling: 2006 Tour de France – Stage 13: Béziers – Montélimar (231.0 km)
  - Floyd Landis (PHO) loses the yellow jersey to Óscar Pereiro (CEI), despite having led him by some 25 minutes at the start of the day. A five-man breakaway leaves the peloton 29:57 behind stage winner Jens Voigt (CSC), who tied with Óscar Pereiro (CEI), Sylvain Chavanel (COF) and Manuel Quinziato (LIQ) were both +40 seconds, Andriy Hrivko (MRM) was +6:24. In the GC Óscar Pereiro (CEI) now leads in 59:50:34, ahead of Floyd Landis (PHO) +1:29, Cyril Dessel (AG2R) +1:37, Denis Menchov (RAB) +2:30, and Cadel Evans (Davitamon) +2:46. (leTour.fr)
- Rugby union: 2006 Tri Nations Series
  - Australia 49–0 South Africa at Suncorp Stadium, Brisbane, Australia.
    - Australia bounces back from their 12–32 loss to the All Blacks a week ago to defeat the Springboks by a record margin. Matt Giteau scores two tries, as the Wallabies go to the top of the table in their bonus point win. The match was the first Tri Nations test since 1999 to feature a scoreless side, and also saw the largest victory margin ever in the Tri Nations. The win was Australia's first in the Tri Nations since 2004.
- Tennis: The 2006 Fed Cup semifinals got under way today, with Italy taking a commanding lead over Spain in Zaragoza and Belgium twice needing three sets to do the same against the US in Ostend.
  - Spain 0–2 Italy:
    - (Italy) Flavia Pennetta beats (Spain) Anabel Medina Garrigues 6–3 6–0.
    - (Italy) Francesca Schiavone beats (Spain) Lourdes Domínguez Lino 6–4 7–5.
  - Belgium 2–0 United States
    - (Belgium) Kirsten Flipkens beats (United States) Jill Craybas 5–7 6–2 6–4.
    - (Belgium) Kim Clijsters beats (United States) Jamea Jackson 4–6 6–2 6–1.

=== 14 July 2006 (Friday) ===
- Cycling: 2006 Tour de France – Stage 12: Luchon – Carcassonne (211.5 km)
  - Yaroslav Popovych (DSC) wins the stage in 4:34:58, 27 seconds ahead of Alessandro Ballan (LAM), 29 ahead of Óscar Freire (RAB), 35 seconds ahead of Christophe Le Mével (C.A). Tom Boonen (QSI) finished 5th, 4 minutes 25 seconds behind Popovych. In the GC Floyd Landis (PHO) retains the yellow jersey in 53:57:30, 8 seconds ahead of Cyril Dessel (AG2R), Denis Menchov (RAB) (+1:01), Cadel Evans (Davitamon) (+1:17), and Carlos Sastre (CSC) (+1:52). (leTour.fr)
- Football (soccer):
  - Serie A scandal of 2006: According to reports, three of the four clubs linked to the match fixing probe have been forcibly relegated to Serie B, and all four are barred from UEFA club competition. The clubs have three days to appeal, with final decisions to be rendered no later than 24 July. (BBC) The punishments for each club are:
    - Juventus: Relegated to Serie B, penalized 30 points in the 2006–07 Serie B table, stripped of their 2005 and 2006 Serie A titles. (Had qualified for the Champions League)
    - Fiorentina: Relegated to Serie B and penalized 12 points for 2006–07. (Had qualified for the Champions League)
    - Lazio: Relegated to Serie B and penalized 7 points for 2006–07. (Had qualified for UEFA Cup)
    - A.C. Milan: Allowed to stay in Serie A, but penalized 15 points for 2006–07. (Had qualified for the Champions League)
  - The contract for USA men's head coach Bruce Arena will not be renewed by the United States Soccer Federation, meaning he will leave the team at the end of 2006. (US Soccer Federation)
- Golf: Michelle Wie taken to hospital by ambulance after playing 9 holes in the second round of the John Deere Classic, and was released because of heat exaution. (ABC News America)

=== 13 July 2006 (Thursday) ===
- Cycling: 2006 Tour de France – Stage 11: Tarbes – Val d'Aran – Pla-de-Beret (mountain stage) (206.5 km)
  - Russian Denis Menchov (RAB) wins the stage, while Floyd Landis (PHO) becomes the fifth American ever to take the yellow jersey after finishing third in the stage.
- Football: 2006–07 UEFA Cup: First Qualifying Round, first leg.
  - Varteks 1 – 1 Tirana
  - Dinamo Tirana 0 – 1 CSKA Sofia
  - Koper 0 – 1 Litex
  - Sarajevo 3 – 0 Rànger's
  - Orašje 0 – 2 Domžale
  - Hibernians 0 – 4 Dinamo Bucharest
  - APOEL 3 – 1 Murata
  - Rijeka 2 – 2 Omonia
  - Lokomotiv Sofia 2 – 0 Makedonija
  - Vardar 1 – 2 Roeselare
  - Rapid Bucharest 5 – 0 Sliema Wanderers
  - Ûjpest 0 – 4 FC Vaduz
  - Zimbru Chişinău 1 – 1 Karabakh
  - MIKA 1 – 3 Young Boys Bern
  - Videoton 1 – 0 Kairat Almaty
  - Zagłębie 1 – 1 Dinamo Minsk
  - Karvan 1 – 0 Spartak Trnava
  - Ameri Tbilisi 0 – 1 Banants
  - BATE Borisov 2 – 0 Nistru Otaci
  - FC Basel 3 – 1 Tobol
  - Artmedia Bratislava 2 – 0 WIT
  - HJK 1 – 1 Drogheda United
  - Brøndby 3 – 1 Valur
  - Gefle 1 – 2 Llanelli
  - Jeunesse Esch 0 – 2 Skonto Riga
  - Åtvidaberg 4 – 0 Etzella
  - Ventspils 2 – 1 GÍ Gøta
  - Glentoran 0 – 1 Brann
  - Randers 1 – 0 ÍA Akranes
  - Portadown 1 – 3 Kaunas
  - Rhyl 0 – 0 Sūduva
  - Levadia Tallinn 2 – 0 FC Haka
  - Skâla 0 – 1 Start
  - Lyn 1 – 1 Flora Tallinn
  - Göteborg 0 – 1 Derry City
- Horse racing: 2006 Kentucky Derby winner Barbaro reportly develops laminitis during recovery from his injuries at the Preakness Stakes, and his condition has been described as "poor". Veterinarians state that he may be euthanized within the next 24 hours. (ESPN)

=== 12 July 2006 (Wednesday) ===
- Football
  - 2006–07 UEFA Champions League: First Qualifying Round, first leg
    - Liepājas Metalurgs 1 – 0 Aktobe-Lento
    - MyPa 1 – 0 The New Saints
    - Cork City 1 – 0 Apollon Limassol
    - Shakhtyor Soligorsk 0 – 1 Široki Brijeg (UEFA.com)
  - Marcello Lippi and Jürgen Klinsmann stand down as head coaches of the Italian and German national teams, respectively.
  - Serie A scandal of 2006: The Daily Telegraph reports that Juventus FC is prepared to sell seven of its top players if relegated from Serie A. Italian stars Fabio Cannavaro, Gianluigi Buffon, Mauro Camoranesi and Gianluca Zambrotta may be sold, along with Patrick Vieira, Lilian Thuram and David Trezeguet. Juventus is faced with losses of up to £50 million.(DT)
  - FIFA lifts its ban on the Hellenic Football Federation after a new Greek sports law is amended to address FIFA's objections regarding political non-interference in sport. (FIFA)
- WNBA: All Star Game at Madison Square Garden, New York City: Led by MVP Katie Douglas' 16 points, the East All-Stars – which featured four members of the Connecticut Sun – beat the West All-Stars for the first time in seven All-Star Games, 98–82.
- Cycling: 2006 Tour de France – Stage 10: Cambo-les-Bains – Pau (mountain stage) (190.5 km)
  - Juan Miguel Mercado (AGR) wins the stage in 4:49:10, while Cyril Dessel (AG2R), who finished with him, takes the yellow jersey and the Polka dot jersey, leading in both the general classification and the mountains classification. Iñigo Landaluze (EUS) finished third, 56 seconds later, followed by Cristian Moreni (COF) (+2:24), and Christophe Rinero (SDV) (+2:25). In the GC, Dessel leads in 43:07:05, followed by Mercado (+2:34), Serhiy Honchar (TMO) (+3:45), Moreni (+3:51), and Floyd Landis (PHO) (+4:45). (leTour.fr)

=== 11 July 2006 (Tuesday) ===
- Football
  - 2006–07 UEFA Champions League: First Qualifying Round, first leg
    - Elbasani 1 – 0 Ekranas
    - TVMK Tallinn 2 – 3 FH Hafnarfjörður
    - Sioni Bolnisi 2 – 0 Baku
    - F91 Dudelange 0 – 1 FK Rabotnički
    - Birkirkara 0 – 3 B36 Tórshavn
    - Linfield 1 – 3 ND Gorica
    - Pyunik 0 – 0 Sheriff Tiraspol (UEFA.com)
  - Seventy-six-year-old UEFA president Lennart Johansson announces he will seek another 4-year term. His only declared opponent is former France national team captain Michel Platini. Franz Beckenbauer encouraged Johansson to stand again, saying that he would only stand if Johansson, who has been president since 1990, stood down. (BBC)
  - Dutchman Leo Beenhakker becomes the new coach of the Poland national football team.
- MLB: 2006 All-Star Game
  - Texas Rangers shortstop Michael Young, down to his last strike with two out in the top of the ninth inning, hits a two-run triple to give the American League a 3–2 win over the National League. This is the first ninth-inning come-from-behind win in the All-Star Game since 1964, when Johnny Callison homered to win that game in New York. (ESPN)
- Cycling: 2006 Tour de France – Stage 9: Bordeaux – Dax (169.5 km)
  - Óscar Freire (RAB) wins another stage in 3:35:24, just ahead of Robbie McEwen (Davitamon), Erik Zabel (MRM). Tom Boonen (QSI), and Cristian Moreni (COF), all on the same time. In the GC, Serhiy Honchar retains the yellow jersey in 38:14:17, followed by Floyd Landis (+1:00), Michael Rogers (+1:08), Patrik Sinkewitz (+1:45), and Andreas Klöden (+1:50). (leTour.fr)
- Auto racing
  - Formula One: Team McLaren Mercedes announces that they have come to terms with Juan Pablo Montoya for his immediate departure from the team, effectively ending his F-1 career. Montoya is scheduled to race in NASCAR's NEXTEL Cup Series next year for Chip Ganassi Racing. Pedro de la Rosa will take Montoya's place on Team McLaren. (ESPN.com)
- Athletics:
  - Liu Xiang of China sets a new world record (pending ratification) for the 110 m hurdles at the Super Grand Prix in Lausanne with a time of 12.88 s. (IAAF)

=== 10 July 2006 (Monday) ===
- MLB: Home Run Derby in Pittsburgh, Pennsylvania: Ryan Howard of the Philadelphia Phillies won the contest beating out the New York Mets' David Wright 5–4 in the final round. Howard also led all competitors by hitting 23 home runs.
- Cycling: 2006 Tour de France – rest day.
  - It is announced that Floyd Landis will require a hip replacement operation after the end of this year's Tour, and that he is receiving cortisone injections with the agreement of the sport's ruling authorities. (Times)

=== 9 July 2006 (Sunday) ===
- Rugby union: All Black Jerry Collins causes controversy after news breaks of him urinating on field only minutes before the opening match of the 2006 Tri Nations Series against Australia on 8 July.(AHN) (stuff.co.nz)
- Football: 2006 FIFA World Cup Final
  - Italy **1–1** France (a.e.t) Italy wins 5–3 on penalties Zinedine Zidane converts a penalty in the 7th minute, only to have the score leveled by Marco Materazzi in the 19th off a corner kick. In extra time, Zidane is sent off in the 110th minute for a headbutt to Materazzi. In the penalty shootout, David Trezeguet's shot hit the crossbar, proving the difference. This is the Azzuri's first World Cup since España 82.
- Tennis: Roger Federer wins the 2006 Wimbledon Gentlemen's singles, his 4th consecutive title at Wimbledon, defeating Rafael Nadal 6–0 7–6 6–7 6–3. (CNN), (Reuters)
- Cycling: 2006 Tour de France, Stage 8: Saint-Méen-le-Grand–Lorient (177 kg)
  - Sylvain Calzati raced away from the pack and won this stage over two minutes ahead of Kjell Carlström, Patrice Halgand, Robbie McEwen and Daniele Bennati. In the GC, Serhiy Honchar holds the yellow jersey in 34:38:53, followed by Floyd Landis (+1:00), Michael Rogers (+1:08), Patrik Sinkewitz (+1:45), and Markus Fothen (+1:50). (leTour.fr)
- Auto racing: Jeff Gordon wins the NASCAR NEXTEL Cup USG Sheetrock 400 at Chicagoland Speedway, spinning out race leader Matt Kenseth with four laps to go.

=== 8 July 2006 (Saturday) ===
- Basketball: LeBron James and the Cleveland Cavaliers reach agreement on a five-year extension of James' contract. (AP via Yahoo)
- Rugby union: 2006 Tri Nations Series
  - New Zealand defeat Australia **32–12** at Jade Stadium, Christchurch, New Zealand. Hooker Keven Mealamu scores two tries and New Zealand win the opening match of the Tri Nations, picking up a bonus point for their four tries.
- Football: FIFA World Cup, Third Place match
  - Germany defeats Portugal **3–1**
- Cycling: 2006 Tour de France – Stage 7: Saint-Grégoire–Rennes (52.0 km) (Individual time trial)
  - Ukrainian Serhiy Honchar wins the time trial and takes the overall classification lead as Tom Boonen finished 21st. (Tour de France website)
- Tennis: Amélie Mauresmo wins the 2006 Wimbledon Ladies' Singles, defeating Justine Henin-Hardenne 2–6 6–3 6–4. (CNN), (Reuters)

=== 7 July 2006 (Friday) ===
- Cycling: 2006 Tour de France – Stage 6: Lisieux–Vitré (189.0 km)
  - Aussie Robbie McEwen wins the stage, but Tom Boonen retains le mallot juene. (LeTour.fr)

=== 6 July 2006 (Thursday) ===
- Cycling: 2006 Tour de France – Stage 5: Beauvais–Caen (225.0 km)
  - Óscar Freire (RAB) wins in a sprint finish with a time of 5:18:50, just ahead of world champion and yellow jersey wearer Tom Boonen (QSI) and Iñaki Isasi (EUS). With the time bonus that goes to the top three finishers, Boonen builds his lead in the General classification to 13 seconds ahead of Michael Rogers from T-Mobile. Freire is now tied for third with George Hincapie of Discovery, 17 seconds back of the Belgian. (leTour)

=== 5 July 2006 (Wednesday) ===
- Rugby league: Rugby League State of Origin.
  - Telstra Dome, Melbourne: Queensland defeats New South Wales 16–14 in the deciding match to claim the 2006 State of Origin series 2–1. Queensland trailed 14–4 with 9 minutes before two tries from Brent Tate and Darren Lockyer help complete the comeback. The series win helps the Maroons avoid a record 4th straight series loss. (ABC Australia)
- Football: FIFA World Cup, Semifinal.
  - Portugal 0 – 1 **France** Zinedine Zidane puts France ahead in the 33rd minute from a penalty awarded when Thierry Henry is brought down.
- Cycling: 2006 Tour de France – Stage 4: Huy (Belgium) –Saint-Quentin (207.0 km)
  - Davitamon's Robbie McEwen wins his second stage of this year's Tour in 4:59:50, ahead of Isaac Gálvez (CEI), Óscar Freire (RAB), Thor Hushovd (C.A), and Tom Boonen (QSI) (all same time). In the GC, Tom Boonen retains the yellow jersey in 19:52:13, Michael Rogers (TMI) and George Hincapie (DSC) retain 2nd and 3rd place with the same times as yesterday, Hushovd is 4th, seven seconds back, and Egoi Martínez (DSC) at +10 seconds. (leTour.fr)

=== 4 July 2006 (Tuesday) ===
- Football:
  - FIFA World Cup, Semifinal.
    - Germany 0 – 2 **Italy** (a.e.t.) A high-tempo end-to-end match remains goal-less until Fabio Grosso scores in the 29th minute of extra time. Alessandro Del Piero seals the match with a goal two minutes later.
  - Non-World Cup news:
    - Stefano Palazzi, prosecutor for the Italian Football Federation, calls for the relegation of all four clubs allegedly linked to the current match-fixing probe in Italian football. Palazzi calls for Juventus to be relegated at least to Serie C1 (third level) and for A.C. Milan, Fiorentina and Lazio to be relegated to Serie B. He also calls for Juventus to be stripped of its 2005 and 2006 Serie A titles. (BBC)
- Cycling: 2006 Tour de France – Stage 3: Esch-sur-Alzette (Luxembourg) – Valkenburg (Netherlands) (216.5 km)
  - In a sprint finish T-Mobile's Matthias Kessler beats team-mate Michael Rogers to first place by five seconds in 4:57:54. The next 46 riders are also given +5 seconds finishing times, led by Daniele Bennati (LAM), Tom Boonen (QSI), and Erik Zabel (MRM). In the GC, Tom Boonen now wears the yellow jersey, in 14:52:23, one second ahead of Michael Rogers, five seconds ahead of George Hincapie (DSC), seven seconds ahead of Thor Hushovd (C.A), and fifteen seconds ahead of Paolo Savoldelli (DSC) and Daniele Bennati. (leTour.fr)

=== 3 July 2006 (Monday) ===
- NHL: After a 22-year career with the Detroit Red Wings, captain Steve Yzerman retires.
- Cycling: 2006 Tour de France – Stage 2: Obernai–Esch-sur-Alzette (Luxembourg) (228.5 km)
  - Davitamon's Robbie McEwen wins the stage into Luxembourg in 5:36:14, followed by Tom Boonen (QSI), Thor Hushovd (C.A), Óscar Freire (RAB) and Daniele Bennati (LAM) (all in the same time). In the General classification, Hushovd regains the maillot jaune at 9:54:19, 5 seconds ahead of Boonen, 8 seconds ahead of McEwen, 10 seconds ahead of George Hincapie (DSC), and a group of four riders 16 seconds behind. (leTour.fr)
- Golf: Annika Sörenstam wins the 18-hole playoff for the 2006 U.S. Women's Open against Pat Hurst, 1-under to 3-over. It is Sörenstam's third U.S. Women's Open title, though her first since going back-to-back in 1995 and 1996, and her tenth major title overall.
- Football: Greece is suspended from international competition by FIFA because a new Greek law does not guarantee political non-interference in football. (FIFA.com) (BBC)

=== 2 July 2006 (Sunday) ===
- Cricket: India in the West Indies:
  - Fourth Test at Kingston, Jamaica: India defeats West Indies by 49 runs to claim the four-Test series 1–0. In a low-scoring affair, India – having won the toss – were dismissed for 200 in their first innings, Jerome Taylor claiming 5/50. The domination of the bowlers continued in the West Indies' first innings as the home side collapsed to be all out for 103, Harbhajan Singh claiming 5/13 from 4.3 overs. Leading by 97 at the innings break, India added another 171 runs to their total, the wickets shared between Corey Collymore (5/48) and Taylor (4/45). Requiring 269 to win, the home side fell short, dismissed for 219 in their second innings, Indian bowler Anil Kumble claiming 6/78. (Scorecard)
- Cycling: 2006 Tour de France – Stage 1: Strasbourg–Strasbourg (184.5 km)
  - Cofidis' Jimmy Casper wins the first proper stage of le Tour in Strasbourg. He wins the stage in a time of 4:10:00. Robbie McEwen finished 2nd, with Erik Zabel in third. But there was drama further back, with yellow jersey wearer Thor Hushovd needing hospital treatment for a bleeding arm, after being hit by a plastic hand. Ironically, these plastic hands are given out by Hushovd's team Crédit Agricole. Even with this bleeding arm, Hushovd finished 9th, but loses his overall lead. George Hincapie of the Discovery Channel Pro Cycling Team takes the overall lead, by winning an intermediate sprint in the German town of Kehl. The 2 points he earned for 3rd place at the sprint, gave him a 2-second time bonus and as he was on the same time as Hushovd from the Prologue, Hincapie took his first-ever yellow jersey as leader of the general classification. Stage 2 runs between Obernai and Esch-sur-Alzette in Luxembourg.(leTour.fr)
- Football: David Beckham resigns as captain of the English national team. (Scotsman)

=== 1 July 2006 (Saturday) ===
- Auto racing: NASCAR NEXTEL Cup Pepsi 400: Tony Stewart wins his second consecutive night race at Daytona International Speedway.
- Football: FIFA World Cup, Quarter final
  - England 0 – 0 **Portugal** (a.e.t.) The match goes to penalties despite David Beckham leaving the pitch due to an unknown leg injury in the 52nd minute, and Wayne Rooney being red-carded ten minutes later. **Portugal** wins 3–1 on penalties.
  - Brazil 0 – 1 **France** France play like the old 1998 team and take the lead through a 56th minute Thierry Henry goal. This is Brazil's first World Cup defeat since 1998.
- Cycling: 2006 Tour de France – Prologue: Strasbourg–Strasbourg (7.1 km) (Individual time trial)
  - Thor Hushovd of the Crédit Agricole team wins the prologue stage of the 2006 Tour in Strasbourg. He beats George Hincapie (DSC) by just under a second. The first stage proper takes place tomorrow.
