= 2006 Chase for the Nextel Cup =

The 2006 Chase for the Nextel Cup was a ten-race series that commenced with the Sylvania 300 on September 17, 2006, at New Hampshire International Speedway and concluded with the Ford 400 on November 19 of that same year at Homestead-Miami Speedway. The first ten drivers in the championship standings (and any other drivers with teams within 400 points of the leader) qualified after the Chevy Rock and Roll 400 on September 9, 2006, at Richmond International Raceway. The 2006 Chase had a strong Chevrolet presence, with seven of the ten teams making the 2006 Chase for the Nextel Cup fielding Chevrolets.

This was the final season for NBC to cover the Chase (now the NASCAR Cup Series playoff) until 2015, and the last Chase covered by TNT. From 2007 to 2014, ABC carried the Chase in its entirety, while TNT televised mid-season races.

== Races ==
=== Sylvania 300 ===
The Sylvania 300 was held on September 17, 2006, at New Hampshire International Speedway The 2005 winner was Ryan Newman, who failed to make the chase this year. The defending track champion was Kyle Busch. Kevin Harvick won the pole and the race.

==== Finishing order of Chase drivers ====
1. Kevin Harvick (1)
2. Jeff Gordon (3)
3. Denny Hamlin (4)
4. Jeff Burton (7)
5. Matt Kenseth (10)
6. Mark Martin (11)
7. Dale Earnhardt Jr. (13)
8. Kasey Kahne (16)
9. Kyle Busch (38)
10. Jimmie Johnson (39)

==== Points changes after race ====
1. Kevin Harvick (+2)
2. Denny Hamlin (+3)
3. Matt Kenseth (-2)
4. Jeff Gordon (+5)
5. Jeff Burton (+3)
6. Mark Martin (+1)
7. Dale Earnhardt Jr. (-1)
8. Kasey Kahne (+2)
9. Jimmie Johnson (-7)
10. Kyle Busch (-6)

=== Dover 400 ===
The Dover 400 was held on September 24, 2006, at the Dover International Speedway. The 2005 winner was Jimmie Johnson who started the chase second in points. Matt Kenseth won the spring event. At this year's race, Jeff Gordon won the pole and Matt Kenseth led the most laps. But it was Jeff Burton, who hadn't won in over 175 races, that prevailed and took the lead in the standings.

==== Finishing order of Chase drivers ====
1. Jeff Burton (1)
2. Jeff Gordon (3)
3. Denny Hamlin (9)
4. Matt Kenseth (10)
5. Jimmie Johnson (13)
6. Mark Martin (14)
7. Dale Earnhardt Jr. (21)
8. Kevin Harvick (32)
9. Kasey Kahne (38)
10. Kyle Busch (40)

==== Points changes after race ====
1. Jeff Burton (+4)
2. Jeff Gordon (+2)
3. Matt Kenseth (0) §
4. Denny Hamlin (-2)
5. Kevin Harvick (-4)
6. Mark Martin (unchanged)
7. Dale Earnhardt Jr. (unchanged)
8. Jimmie Johnson (+1)
9. Kasey Kahne (-1)
10. Kyle Busch (unchanged)

§ - Holds tiebreaker with more wins

=== Banquet 400 ===
The Banquet 400 was held on October 1, 2006, at the Kansas Speedway. The 2005 winner was Mark Martin who started the chase seventh in points. Additionally, this race was held a week earlier than in 2005. Kasey Kahne won the pole. A fuel mileage gamble would have put Jimmie Johnson in great position for Talladega by winning, but he ran out of gas with four laps to go. Tony Stewart took the lead and won a wild one by running out of gas in Turn 2 but still making it all the way around the track to the finish line.

==== Finishing order of Chase drivers ====
1. Mark Martin (3)
2. Jeff Burton (5)
3. Kyle Busch (7)
4. Dale Earnhardt Jr. (10)
5. Jimmie Johnson (14)
6. Kevin Harvick (15)
7. Denny Hamlin (18)
8. Matt Kenseth (23)
9. Kasey Kahne (33)
10. Jeff Gordon (39)

==== Points changes after race ====
1. Jeff Burton (unchanged)
2. Denny Hamlin (+2)
3. Mark Martin (+3)
4. Matt Kenseth (-2)
5. Kevin Harvick (unchanged)
6. Jeff Gordon (-4)
7. Dale Earnhardt Jr. (unchanged)
8. Jimmie Johnson (unchanged)
9. Kyle Busch (+1)
10. Kasey Kahne (-1)

=== UAW Ford 500 ===
The UAW-Ford 500 was held on October 8 at the newly repaved Talladega Superspeedway. Considered the wild card track in the Chase, all drivers fear that they will be caught in "The Big One". The 2005 winner was Dale Jarrett who missed the chase this year. The defending track champion was Jimmie Johnson. The race was held one week later than in 2005. At this year's event, David Gilliland won his first career Bud Pole Award, and Dale Earnhardt Jr. led the most laps. In a wild finish, Dale Earnhardt Jr. led going into turn 3 on the final lap, with Jimmie Johnson and Brian Vickers trailing. Johnson moved down low to pass Earnhardt, and his teammate Vickers followed, but accidentally caught the right rear quarter panel of Johnson's Chevrolet. Johnson spun up into Earnhardt's car, sending both of them down into the infield grass. Vickers moved past and took his first career victory, amid boos from Earnhardt's and Johnson's fans.

==== Finishing order of Chase drivers ====
1. Kasey Kahne (2)
2. Matt Kenseth (4)
3. Kevin Harvick (6)
4. Mark Martin (8)
5. Kyle Busch (11)
6. Denny Hamlin (21)
7. Dale Earnhardt Jr. (23)
8. Jimmie Johnson (24)
9. Jeff Burton (27)
10. Jeff Gordon (36)

==== Points changes after race ====
1. Jeff Burton (unchanged)
2. Matt Kenseth (+2)
3. Mark Martin (unchanged)
4. Kevin Harvick (+1)
5. Denny Hamlin (-3)
6. Dale Earnhardt Jr. (+1)
7. Jeff Gordon (-1)
8. Jimmie Johnson (unchanged)
9. Kasey Kahne (+1)
10. Kyle Busch (-1)

=== Bank of America 500 ===
The Bank of America 500 was held on October 14 at the Lowe's Motor Speedway. The 2005 winner was Jimmie Johnson who won two of the three races in Charlotte that year. The defending track champion was Kasey Kahne, however Johnson was the defending champion for 500-mile races at the track. At this year's event, Scott Riggs won the pole and Kasey Kahne led the most laps. Championship contender Mark Martin was involved in a hard crash after being tagged by J. J. Yeley.

==== Finishing order of Chase drivers ====
1. Kasey Kahne (1)
2. Jimmie Johnson (2)
3. Jeff Burton (3)
4. Dale Earnhardt Jr. (4)
5. Kyle Busch (6)
6. Matt Kenseth (14)
7. Kevin Harvick (18)
8. Jeff Gordon (24)
9. Denny Hamlin (28)
10. Mark Martin (30)

==== Points changes after race ====
1. Jeff Burton (unchanged)
2. Matt Kenseth (unchanged)
3. Kevin Harvick (+1)
4. Mark Martin (-1)
5. Dale Earnhardt Jr. (+1)
6. Denny Hamlin (-1)
7. Jimmie Johnson (+1)
8. Kasey Kahne (+1)
9. Kyle Busch (+1)
10. Jeff Gordon (-3)

=== Subway 500 ===
The Subway 500 was held on October 22 at the Martinsville Speedway. The 2005 winner was Jeff Gordon who started the chase ninth in points this year and also won both races at the track in 2003. The defending track champion was Tony Stewart. On lap 188, the entire complexity of the Chase was changed. The consistent Jeff Burton, who had been involved in a previous accident, had engine troubles which relegated him to a 42nd-place finish. Jimmie Johnson led the most laps and won the race.

==== Finishing order of Chase drivers ====
1. Jimmie Johnson (1)
2. Denny Hamlin (2)
3. Jeff Gordon (5)
4. Kasey Kahne (7)
5. Kevin Harvick (9)
6. Matt Kenseth (11)
7. Kyle Busch (18)
8. Dale Earnhardt Jr. (22)
9. Mark Martin (24)
10. Jeff Burton (42)

==== Points changes after race ====
1. Matt Kenseth (+1)
2. Kevin Harvick (+1)
3. Jimmie Johnson (+4)
4. Denny Hamlin (+2)
5. Jeff Burton (-4)
6. Dale Earnhardt Jr. (-1)
7. Mark Martin (-3)
8. Kasey Kahne (unchanged)
9. Jeff Gordon (+1)
10. Kyle Busch (-1)

=== Bass Pro Shops 500 ===
The Bass Pro Shops 500 was held on October 29 at the Atlanta Motor Speedway. The 2005 winner was Carl Edwards who missed the chase this year. The defending track champion was Kasey Kahne. Matt Kenseth was awarded the pole after qualifying was washed out, but Tony Stewart spoiled the party winning the race.

==== Finishing order of Chase drivers ====
1. Jimmie Johnson (2)
2. Dale Earnhardt Jr. (3)
3. Matt Kenseth (4)
4. Jeff Gordon (6)
5. Denny Hamlin (8)
6. Jeff Burton (13)
7. Kyle Busch (27)
8. Kevin Harvick (31)
9. Mark Martin (36)
10. Kasey Kahne (38)

==== Points changes after race ====
1. Matt Kenseth (unchanged)
2. Jimmie Johnson (+1)
3. Denny Hamlin (+1)
4. Dale Earnhardt Jr. (+2) §
5. Jeff Burton (unchanged)
6. Kevin Harvick (-1)
7. Jeff Gordon (+2)
8. Mark Martin (-1)
9. Kasey Kahne (-1)
10. Kyle Busch (unchanged)

§ — Hold tiebreaker.

=== Dickies 500 ===
The Dickies 500 was held on November 5 at the Texas Motor Speedway. The 2005 winner was Carl Edwards. The defending track champion was Kasey Kahne. The race was extended five laps due to the green-white-checkers rule, and for the second week in a row, Tony Stewart played spoiler and won the event.

==== Finishing order of Chase drivers ====
1. Jimmie Johnson (2)
2. Kevin Harvick (3)
3. Kyle Busch (4)
4. Dale Earnhardt Jr. (6)
5. Jeff Gordon (9)
6. Denny Hamlin (10)
7. Matt Kenseth (12)
8. Mark Martin (22)
9. Kasey Kahne (32)
10. Jeff Burton (38)

==== Points changes after race ====
1. Jimmie Johnson +1
2. Matt Kenseth -1
3. Dale Earnhardt Jr. +1
4. Denny Hamlin -1
5. Kevin Harvick +1
6. Jeff Gordon +1
7. Jeff Burton -2
8. Kyle Busch +2
9. Mark Martin-1
10. Kasey Kahne -1

=== Checker Auto Parts 500 ===
The Checker Auto Parts 500 presented by Pennzoil Platinum was held on November 12 at the Phoenix International Raceway. Kevin Harvick swept the season's races (having won the Subway Fresh 500 back in April) with the win here, while Jeff Gordon won the pole for this race. At one point in this race, all ten drivers were in the top dozen, but Kyle Busch, who came in as the defending champion of this race and began the Chase in fifth place, was involved in a late race crash, becoming one of five drivers to be mathematically eliminated from the Chase before Homestead.

==== Finishing order of Chase drivers ====
1. Kevin Harvick (1)
2. Jimmie Johnson (2)
3. Denny Hamlin (3)
4. Jeff Gordon (4)
5. Mark Martin (6)
6. Kasey Kahne (7)
7. Dale Earnhardt Jr. (8)
8. Jeff Burton (10)
9. Matt Kenseth (13)
10. Kyle Busch (39)

==== Points changes after race ====
1. Jimmie Johnson (unchanged)
2. Matt Kenseth (unchanged)
3. Kevin Harvick (+2) §
4. Denny Hamlin (unchanged)
5. Dale Earnhardt Jr. (-2)
6. Jeff Gordon (-1)
7. Jeff Burton (unchanged) ~
8. Mark Martin (+1) ~
9. Kasey Kahne (+1) ~
10. Kyle Busch (-2) ~

~ - Mathematically eliminated from Chase as of this race.

§ - Holds tiebreaker with more wins.

=== Ford 400 ===
The Ford 400 was held on November 19 at the Homestead-Miami Speedway. Greg Biffle, who missed the chase this year, defended his championship for the third time. The race was also the swan song (for at least the next eight years) for NBC's telecasts. Kasey Kahne won the pole for this race, while Jimmie Johnson took ninth place, enough to clinch his first Nextel Championship, and the first for Jeff Gordon as a car owner, winning four titles under the Winston Cup banner as a driver for Rick Hendrick.

==== Finishing order among Chase drivers ====
1. Denny Hamlin (3)
2. Kasey Kahne (4)
3. Kevin Harvick (5)
4. Matt Kenseth (6)
5. Jimmie Johnson (9) ‡
6. Jeff Burton (14)
7. Mark Martin (18)
8. Dale Earnhardt Jr. (19)
9. Jeff Gordon (24)
10. Kyle Busch (38)

==== Final standings ====
1. Jimmie Johnson 6,475 pts (‡ — 2006 Nextel Cup Series Champion)
2. Matt Kenseth -56 pts (unchanged)
3. Denny Hamlin -68 pts (+1) (Rookie of the Year)
4. Kevin Harvick -78 pts (-1)
5. Dale Earnhardt Jr. -147 pts (unchanged)
6. Jeff Gordon -219 pts (unchanged)
7. Jeff Burton -247 pts (unchanged)
8. Kasey Kahne -29 pts (+1)
9. Mark Martin -307 pts (-1)
10. Kyle Busch - 448 pts (unchanged)

== Trivia ==
- Denny Hamlin became the first rookie to make the Chase for the Cup.
- Tony Stewart did not make the Chase for the Cup this year. This marked the first time since the chase format was implemented in 2004 that the defending champion did not clinch a spot. However, he won three of the Chase races en route to a $1 million (US) bonus as the best finisher not among the drivers participating in the Chase. In both years, the winner of the regular season did not make the next year's Chase.
- Jimmie Johnson, Matt Kenseth, and Mark Martin returned for their third consecutive chase, while Jeff Gordon and Dale Earnhardt Jr. entered their second chase and Denny Hamlin, Kevin Harvick, Kasey Kahne, Kyle Busch, and Jeff Burton all qualified for their first chase.
- Jeremy Mayfield, Ryan Newman, Kurt Busch and Tony Stewart made the first two chases but failed to make this year's playoff, with Mayfield without a team after being released by Evernham Motorsports in August.
- The top three finishers of the 2005 Chase did not qualify for the 2006 chase. (#1 Tony Stewart, #2 Greg Biffle, and #3 Carl Edwards)

Preceded by 2005 Chase for the Nextel Cup	NASCAR seasons 2006	Succeeded by 2007 Chase for the Nextel Cup
