= Brazil at the Lusofonia Games =

Brazil has participated in all the Lusophone Games since the beginning in 2006. Brazil is the first in the all time medal table.

== Medal tables ==
=== By championships ===
| Year | Gold | Silver | Bronze | Total | Rank |
|---|---|---|---|---|---|
| 2006 Macau | 29 | 19 | 9 | 57 | 1 |
| (Portugal) 2009 Lisbon | 33 | 23 | 20 | 76 | 1 |
| (India) 2014 Goa | 2 | 1 | 3 | 6 | 7 |
| (Brazil) 2024 Goiânia | | | | | |
| Total | 64 | 43 | 32 | 139 | 1 |

=== By sports ===
Updated after the 2009 Lusophone Games

| Pos | Sport | Gold | Silver | Bronze | Total |
|---|---|---|---|---|---|
| 1 | Athletics | 34 | 29 | 23 | 86 |
| 2 | Judo | 11 | 2 | 1 | 14 |
| 3 | Taekwondo | 7 | 2 | 1 | 10 |
| 4 | Table tennis | 5 | 5 | 2 | 12 |
| 5 | Beach volleyball | 3 | 2 | 2 | 7 |
| 6 | Futsal | 2 | 0 | 0 | 2 |
| 7 | Basketball | 0 | 1 | 0 | 1 |
| 8 | Disabled athletics | 0 | 1 | 0 | 1 |
| | Total | 62 | 42 | 29 | 133 |
