= Angola at the Lusofonia Games =

Angola at the Lusophone Games
- Flag of Angola
- IOC code: ANG
- NOC: Angolan Olympic Committee
- Website: comiteolimpicoangolano.com/pt
- Medals Ranked 6th: Gold 9 Silver 12 Bronze 25 Total 46

Angola participates in the Lusophone Games, a multi-sport event for Portuguese-speaking countries, as a member of ACOLOP. Angola participated in the 2006 games in Macau, the first edition of the Lusophone Games. Angola has sent athletes to all three editions of the Lusophone Games and won medals at all three. Angola did not win any gold medals in 2006 but has won gold medals at all Games since, with four in 2009 and five in 2014.

== Background ==
The Lusophone Games is a multinational multi-sport event for countries that are Portuguese-speaking. The name of the Games comes from the term Lusophone which is a name for Portuguese-speaking people. The competition is organised by the Association of the Portuguese Speaking Olympic Committees (Portuguese: Associação dos Comités Olímpicos de Língua Oficial Portuguesa) (ACOLOP) which is an Olympic-related not-for-profit organisation. The Lusophone Games is contested by Angola, Brazil, Cape Verde, East Timor, Equatorial Guinea, Guinea-Bissau, Macau, Mozambique, Portugal, São Tomé and Príncipe and Sri Lanka as well as the Indian state of Goa.

Angola was a Portuguese colony between 1575 and 1975 before gaining independence in the Angolan War of Independence. Portuguese is the national language of Angola. Alongside the Lusophony Games, Angola also competes at other multi-sport games such as the Olympics.

== 2006 ==
The first Lusophone Games was the 2006 edition held in Macau, which is an autonomous territory of China. In total, 773 athletes competed at the Games with 58 of them Angolan. The Angolan delegation was the fourth largest at the Games with Macau (155), Portugal (140) and Brazil (74) the countries with larger delegations than Angola. The Angolan men's national basketball team reached the final of the men's basketball competition where they lost 59–53 to Portugal. In the men's football competition, Angola won the silver medal after reaching the final, where they eventually lost to Portugal 2–0. Angola won the bronze medal in the men's futsal. Overall, Angola won a total of five medals with three silvers and two bronzes. They finished seventh out of eleven countries on the medal table.

== 2009 ==
The second Lusophony Games was held in Lisbon, Portugal. At the Games, Angola won four gold medals. The gold medalists were Cândido Cândido and Maria Celeste Manuel (both competing in the disabled athletics), Antónia Moreira in Judo, and the men's basketball team, who beat Cape Verde in the final of their competition. In other team sports, Angola won a bronze medal in men's football, and a bronze medal in men's futsal. Overall, Angola finished third in the medal tally with four golds, one silver and nine bronzes. The two countries that beat Angola were Brazil and Portugal.

== 2014 ==
The 2014 Lusophone Games was held in Goa, India. Angola won five gold medals. These were achieved by Osvaldo Morais (athletics men's 100 metres), Alexandre João (athletics men's 10 kilometres), Felismina Cavela (athletics women's 800 metres), Antónia Moreira (Judo) and Mario Rafael (Judo). Angola won silver medals in both the men's and women's basketball competitions. In total, Angola won 27 medals at the 2014 Games, with five golds, eight silvers, and 14 bronzes. They finished fifth on the medal tally, behind India, Portugal, Macau and Sri Lanka.
