= Cape Verde at the Lusofonia Games =

Overall performance of Cape Verde in the Lusophone Games.

== Medal table by sports ==
Pos	Sport	Gold	Silver	Bronze	Total
1	Athletics	3	6	5	14
2	Football	1	0	1	2
3	Taekwondo	0	1	3	4
4	Basketball	0	1	0	1
5	Volleyball	0	0	3	3
6	Disabled athletics	0	0	2	2
6	Judo	0	0	2	2
	Total	4	8	16	28

== Participation by year ==
- 2006
- 2009
- 2014
