= Mozambique at the Lusofonia Games =

Overall performance of Mozambique in the Lusophone Games.

== Medal table by sports ==
Pos	Sport	Gold	Silver	Bronze	Total
1	Athletics	5	1	4	10
2	Basketball	2	0	1	3
3	Judo	0	2	2	4
4	Taekwondo	0	2	1	3
5	Volleyball	0	1	1	2
6	Football	0	1	0	1
7	Beach volleyball	0	0	1	1
	Total	7	7	10	24

== Participation by year ==
- 2006
- 2009
- 2014
