= Athletics at the 2011 Pan American Games – Men's 3000 metres steeplechase =

Men's 3000 metres steeplechase at the 2011 Pan American Games
- Venue: Telmex Athletics Stadium
- Dates: October 28, 2011
- Competitors: 13 from 10 nations
- Winning time: 8:48.19

Medalists
Gold medal	José Peña	Venezuela
Silver medal	Hudson de Souza	Brazil
Bronze medal	José Alberto Sánchez	Cuba

The men's 3000 metres steeplechase competition of the athletics events at the 2011 Pan American Games took place on the 28th October at the Telmex Athletics Stadium. The 2007 champion Pan American Games Joshua McAdams of the United States, did not compete.

== Records ==
Prior to this competition, the existing world and Pan American Games records were as follows:

World record	Saif Saaeed Shaheen (QAT)	7:53.63	Brussels, Belgium	September 3, 2004
Pan American Games record	Wander do Prado Moura (BRA)	8:14.41	Mar del Plata, Argentina	March 22, 1995

== Qualification ==
Each National Olympic Committee (NOC) was able to enter two athletes regardless if they had met the qualification standard.

== Schedule ==
Date	Time	Round
October 28, 2011	17:05	Final

== Results ==
All times shown are in seconds.

KEY:	q	Fastest non-qualifiers	Q	Qualified	NR	National record	PB	Personal best	SB	Seasonal best	DQ	Disqualified

=== Final ===
Held on October 28.

Rank	Name	Nationality	Time	Notes
1st place, gold medalist(s)	José Peña	Venezuela	8:48.19	
2nd place, silver medalist(s)	Hudson de Souza	Brazil	8:48.75	
3rd place, bronze medalist(s)	José Alberto Sánchez	Cuba	8:49.75	
4	Donald Cowart	United States	8:49.97	
5	Marvin Blanco	Venezuela	8:50.85	
6	Derek Scott	United States	8:55.03	
7	Mario Bazan	Peru	8:56.31	
8	Jose Bañales	Mexico	9:02.78	
9	Enzo Yañez	Chile	9:07.63	
10	Mariano Mastromarino	Argentina	9:09.42	
	Cristian Patiño	Ecuador	DNF	
	Yosvany Rodriguez	Cuba	DNF	
	Alexander Greaux	Puerto Rico	DNS	
