= Guinea-Bissau at the Lusofonia Games =

Overall performance of Guinea-Bissau in the Lusophone Games.

== Medal table by sports ==
Pos	Sport	Gold	Silver	Bronze	Total
1	Athletics	1	1	1	3
2	Judo	1	0	0	1
	Total	2	1	1	4

== Participation by year ==
- 2006
- 2009
- 2014
