= Claudirene César =

Brazilian judoka (born 1985)

Personal information
- Born: 7 February 1985 (age 41)
- Occupation: Judoka

Sport
- Country: Brazil
- Sport: Judo
- Weight class: –78 kg, +78 kg

Achievements and titles
- Pan American Champ.: (2005, 2009)
Medal record
Women's judo
Representing Brazil
Pan American Championships
Silver medal – second place	2005 Caguas	–78 kg
Silver medal – second place	2009 Buenos Aires	+78 kg
Bronze medal – third place	2009 Buenos Aires	Open
World Juniors Championships
Bronze medal – third place	2002 Jeju Island Korea	–78 kg
Summer Universiade
Bronze medal – third place	2011 Shenzhen	Open
Lusophony Games
Silver medal – second place	2009 Lisbon	–78 kg

Profile at external databases
- JudoInside.com: 26460
- Updated on 16 February 2022

Claudirene Maria César (born February 7, 1985, in São José dos Campos, São Paulo) is a judoka from Brazil.

== Biography ==
César was born in São José dos Campos and begun with judo in 7. Three years later she was already champion of São Paulo region.

She is one of the best Brazilian judoka in heavyweight category but usually second or third in the team. She is often injured like in beginning of 2006 when she was out for 3 months with a dislocated arm.

== Judo ==
She won silver and bronze medal at 2009 Pan American Judo Championships in half-heavyweight category.

== Achievements ==
Year	Tournament	Place	Weight class
2009	Pan American Judo Championships	2nd	Heavyweight (+ 78 kg)
2009	Pan American Judo Championships	3rd	Openweight
2009	Lusophony Games	2nd	Half-Heavyweight (- 78 kg)
