= List of Lusofonia Games records in athletics =

The Lusophone Games records in athletics are set by athletes who are representing one of the ACOLOP's member federations, which involves athletes coming from Lusophone (Portuguese-speaking) countries.

== Men ==
Event	Record	Athlete	Nationality	Date	Games	Place	Ref.
100 m	10.18 (+1.7 m/s)	Francis Obikwelu	Portugal	12 July 2009	2009 Lusophone Games	Lisbon, Portugal	
200 m	21.40 (+0.3 m/s)	Holder da Silva	Guinea-Bissau	25 January 2014	2014 Lusophone Games	Bambolim, India	
400 m	46.23	Eduardo Vasconselos	Brazil	12 July 2009	2009 Lusophone Games	Lisbon, Portugal	
800 m	1:48.89	Lutmar Paes	Brazil	12 July 2009	2009 Lusophone Games	Lisbon, Portugal	
1500 m	3:48.15	Chaminda Wijekoon	Sri Lanka	13 July 2009	2009 Lusophone Games	Lisbon, Portugal	
5000 m	14:22.40	Sergio Silva	Brazil	2006	2006 Lusophone Games	Macau, China	
110 m hurdles	13.97	Anselmo da Silva	Brazil	12 July 2009	2009 Lusophone Games	Lisbon, Portugal	
400 m hurdles	50.02	Kurt Couto	Mozambique	2006	2006 Lusophone Games	Macau, China	
3000 m steeplechase	8:38.48	Alberto Paulo	Portugal	13 July 2009	2009 Lusophone Games	Lisbon, Portugal	
High jump	2.16 m	Guilherme Cobbo	Brazil	13 July 2009	2009 Lusophony Games	Lisbon, Portugal	
Long jump	7.79 m	Rogério Bispo	Brazil	2006	2006 Lusophone Games	Macau, China	
Triple jump	17.15 m	Nelson Évora	Portugal	13 July 2009	2009 Lusophone Games	Lisbon, Portugal	
Shot put	19.74 m	Marco Fortes	Portugal	12 July 2009	2009 Lusophone Games	Lisbon, Portugal	
Discus throw							
Hammer throw							
Javelin throw							
Decathlon							
Decathlon	100m / Long jump / Shot put / High jump / 400m / 110m H / Discus / Pole vault / Javelin / 1500m						
20 km walk (road)							
50 km walk (road)							
4 × 100 m relay							
4 × 400 m relay							

== Women ==
Event	Record	Athlete	Nationality	Date	Games	Place	Ref.
100 m							
200 m							
400 m							
800 m							
1500 m							
3000 m							
5000 m							
10,000 m							
Marathon							
100 m hurdles							
400 m hurdles							
3000 m steeplechase							
High jump							
Pole vault							
Long jump							
Triple jump							
Shot put							
Discus throw							
Hammer throw							
Javelin throw							
Heptathlon							
Heptathlon	100m H / High jump / Shot put / 200m / Long jump / Javelin / 800m						
20 km walk (road)							
4 × 100 m relay							
4 × 400 m relay							
