= Timor-Leste at the Lusofonia Games =

Overall performance of East Timor in the Lusophony Games. East Timor won 1 bronze medal at the 2014 Lusofonia Games.

== Medal table by sports ==
Pos	Sport	Gold	Silver	Bronze	Total
1	Athletics	0	0	2	2
2	Volleyball	0	0	1	1
	Total	0	0	2	2

== Participation by year ==
- 2006
- 2009
- 2014
