= Futsal at the Lusofonia Games =

Futsal at the Lusofonia Games was held in Macau in 2006 and in Lisbon in 2009. Only the men's tournament has been contested so far.

== Men's tournament ==
Lusophone Games
Year	Host	Winner	Runner-up	3rd Place	Citation
2006; Details	Macau, China	Brazil	Portugal	Angola
2009; Details	Lisbon, Portugal	Brazil	Portugal	Angola

== Medal table ==
Rank	Nation	Gold	Silver	Bronze	Total
1	Brazil	2	0	0	2
2	Portugal	0	2	0	2
3	Angola	0	0	2	2
Totals (3 entries)		2	2	2	6
