= Athletics at the 2011 Summer Universiade – Men's 3000 metres steeplechase =

The men's 3000 metres steeplechase event at the 2011 Summer Universiade was held on 17–20 August.

== Medalists ==
Gold	Silver	Bronze
Alberto Paulo; Portugal	Halil Akkaş; Turkey	Ildar Minshin; Russia

== Results ==
=== Heats ===
Qualification: First 4 in each heat (Q) and the next 4 fastest (q) qualified for the final.

Rank	Heat	Name	Nationality	Time	Notes
1	2	Ildar Minshin	Russia	8:45.32	Q
2	2	Alberto Paulo	Portugal	8:46.64	Q
3	2	Rabia Makhloufi	Algeria	8:48.54	Q
4	2	Patrick Nasti	Italy	8:49.54	Q
5	2	Edwin Molepo	South Africa	8:50.04	q
6	1	Sebastián Martos	Spain	8:53.23	Q
7	1	Halil Akkaş	Turkey	8:53.23	Q
8	1	Ben Toroitich Kiplagat	Uganda	8:53.28	Q
9	1	Nikolay Chavkin	Russia	8:53.28	Q
10	1	Dean Brummer	South Africa	8:53.52	q
11	2	Joonas Harjamaki	Finland	8:54.97	q
12	1	Yang Le	China	8:55.57	q
13	1	Alexandru Ghinea	Romania	9:00.78	
14	2	Sergei Tšerepannikov	Estonia	9:07.55	SB
15	1	Albert Minczér	Hungary	9:18.56	
16	2	Juan Robles	United States Virgin Islands	9:32.58	PB
17	1	Karthik Jayamaran	Malaysia	9:53.68	
18	1	Jonathan Cerrud	Panama	10:01.74	
19	1	Owaydhah Balhareth	Saudi Arabia	10:23.97	
	1	Víctor García	Spain	DNS	
	2	Mohmmad Khazaei	Iran	DNS	
	2	Tomasz Szymkowiak	Poland	DNS	
	2	Diego Tamayo	Spain	DNS	

=== Final ===
Rank	Name	Nationality	Time	Notes
1st place, gold medalist(s)	Alberto Paulo	Portugal	8:32.26	
2nd place, silver medalist(s)	Halil Akkaş	Turkey	8:34.57	SB
3rd place, bronze medalist(s)	Ildar Minshin	Russia	8:34.86	
4	Nikolay Chavkin	Russia	8:35.10	
5	Sebastián Martos	Spain	8:44.44	
6	Patrick Nasti	Italy	8:45.06	
7	Dean Brummer	South Africa	8:47.24	
8	Edwin Molepo	South Africa	8:47.50	
9	Rabia Makhloufi	Algeria	8:50.71	
10	Joonas Harjamaki	Finland	8:52.64	
11	Ben Toroitich Kiplagat	Uganda	8:53.46	
12	Yang Le	China	9:01.15	
