= Alberto Paulo =

Portuguese steeplechase runner

Personal information
- Nationality: Portuguese
- Born: 3 October 1985 (age 40)

Sport
- Country: Portugal
- Sport: Track and field
- Event: 3000 metres steeplechase
Medal record
Men's track and field
Representing Portugal
Universiade
Gold medal – first place	Shenzhen 2011	3000 m steeplechase
Ibero-American Championships
Bronze medal – third place	San Fernando 2010	3000 m steeplechase
Lusofonia Games
Gold medal – first place	Lisbon 2009	3000 m steeplechase
Silver medal – second place	Macau 2006	3000 m steeplechase

Alberto Paulo (born 3 October 1985) is a Portuguese track and field athlete who mainly competes in the 3000 metres steeplechase.

== Achievements ==
Year	Competition	Venue	Position	Event	Notes
Representing Portugal
2006	Lusophony Games	Macau, PR China	2nd	3000 m steeplechase	8:59.07
2007	European U23 Championships	Debrecen, Hungary	7th	3000m steeplechase	8:38.76
2008	Olympic Games	Beijing, China	34th (h)	3000 m steeplechase	8:39.11
2009	Universiade	Belgrade, Serbia	6th	3000 m steeplechase	8:29.86
2009	Lusophony Games	Lisbon, Portugal	1st	3000 m steeplechase	8:38.48
2009	World Championships	Berlin, Germany	29th (h)	3000 m steeplechase	8:43.13
2010	Ibero-American Championships	San Fernando, Spain	3rd	3000 m steeplechase	8:34.52
2010	European Championships	Barcelona, Spain	10th	3000 m steeplechase	8:28.08
2011	Universiade	Shenzhen, China	1st	3000 m steeplechase	8:32.26
2011	World Championships	Daegu, South Korea	15th	3000 m steeplechase	8:22.41
2012	European Championships	Helsinki, Finland	18th (h)	3000 m steeplechase	8:41.63
2012	Olympic Games	London, United Kingdom	31st (h)	3000 m steeplechase	8:40.74
2014	European Championships	Zürich, Switzerland	24th (h)	3000 m steeplechase	8:47.18
