= Beach volleyball at the 2009 Lusofonia Games =

The Beach Volleyball tournament of the 2009 Lusophone Games was played in Lisbon, Portugal. The venue was the Praia de Santo Amaro de Oeiras. The tournament was played from July 16 to 19 July 2009, and there are both men's and women's competition.

== Beach Volleyball medal table by country ==
Pos	Country	Gold	Silver	Bronze	Total
1	Brazil	1	1	2	4
2	Portugal	1	1	0	2
					6

== Male Competition ==
1st round	2nd round	Semifinals	Finals
(Timor-Leste) Profiro Xavier-Feliciano Soar
(Portugal) Miguel Maia-João Brenha	(Portugal) Miguel Maia-João Brenha
(Cape Verde) Hiriberto Gomes-Valdir Reis	(Mozambique) Délcio Soares-Augusto Cherinda
(Mozambique) Délcio Soares-Augusto Cherinda		(Portugal) Miguel Maia-João Brenha
(India) Ravi Shirodker-Sanjay Shiroker		(Portugal) José Pedrosa-Hugo Gaspar
(Portugal) José Pedrosa-Hugo Gaspar	(Portugal) José Pedrosa-Hugo Gaspar
(India) Manuel Pires-Silvester Rodrigues	(Angola) Walter Gonçalo-Marcos Maia
(Angola) Walter Gonçalo-Marcos Maia			(Portugal) José Pedrosa-Hugo Gaspar
(Brazil) Rogério Ferreira-Bernardo Romano			(Brazil) Thiago Barbosa-Jan Ferreira
(Sri Lanka) Dammika Bandara-Pubudu Ekanayakege	(Brazil) Rogério Ferreira-Bernardo Romano
(Angola) Morais Abreu-Mário Silva	(Angola) Morais Abreu-Mário Silva
(Sri Lanka) Wasantha Devage-Mahamalage Perera		(Brazil) Rogério Ferreira-Bernardo Romano	Third place
(São Tomé and Príncipe) Nisseily Nascimento-Neyd Costa		(Brazil) Thiago Barbosa-Jan Ferreira
(Timor-Leste) Nicolau Xavier-Carlos Guterres	(Timor-Leste) Nicolau Xavier-Carlos Guterres		(Portugal) Miguel Maia-João Brenha
(Brazil) Thiago Barbosa-Jan Ferreira	(Brazil) Thiago Barbosa-Jan Ferreira		(Brazil) Rogério Ferreira-Bernardo Romano
bye

== Female Competition ==
=== Top half ===
1st round	2nd round	3rd round
bye
(Portugal) Juliana Antunes-Francisca Esteves	(Portugal) Juliana Antunes-Francisca Esteves
(Angola) Marlene Costa-Sara Kunga	(Angola) Marlene Costa-Sara Kunga
(Cape Verde) Irina Delgado-Erica Firmino		(Portugal) Juliana Antunes-Francisca Esteves
(Angola) Djamila Costa-Silvina Santos		(Sri Lanka) T. Appuhamilage-S. Withanage
(India) Lysette Rodrigues-Danish Dias	(Angola) Djamila Costa-Silvina Santos
(Sri Lanka) T. Appuhamilage-S. Withanage	(Sri Lanka) T. Appuhamilage-S. Withanage
bye

=== Bottom half ===
1st round	2nd round	3rd round
bye
(Portugal) Rosa Costa-Ana Freches	(Portugal) Rosa Costa-Ana Freches
(India) Christie Dias-Lavina Rodrigues	(India) Christie Dias-Lavina Rodrigues
(Cape Verde) Aleida Monteiro-Patrícia Neves		(Portugal) Rosa Costa-Ana Freches
(Sri Lanka) D. Hewage-G. Bogahalanda		(Brazil) Liliane Maestrini-Luana Madeira
(Brazil) Fabiane Boogaredt-Taiana Souza	(Brazil) Fabiane Boogaredt-Taiana Souza
(Brazil) Liliane Maestrini-Luana Madeira	(Brazil) Liliane Maestrini-Luana Madeira
bye

=== Repechage ===
First round
bye
(India) Lysette Rodrigues-Danish Dias
bye
(Cape Verde) Irina Delgado-Erica Firmino
bye
(Cape Verde) Aleida Monteiro-Patrícia Neves
bye
(Sri Lanka) D. Hewage-G. Bogahalanda

Second round
(India) Christie Dias-Lavina Rodrigues
(India) Lysette Rodrigues-Danish Dias
(Brazil) Fabiane Boogaredt-Taiana Souza
(Cape Verde) Irina Delgado-Erica Firmino
(Angola) Marlene Costa-Sara Kunga
(Cape Verde) Aleida Monteiro-Patrícia Neves
(Angola) Djamila Costa-Silvina Santos
(Sri Lanka) D. Hewage-G. Bogahalanda

Third round
(India) Christie Dias-Lavina Rodrigues
(Brazil) Fabiane Boogaredt-Taiana Souza
(Angola) Marlene Costa-Sara Kunga
(Angola) Djamila Costa-Silvina Santos

Medal finals
(Sri Lanka) T. Appuhamilage-S. Withanage
(Brazil) Fabiane Boogaredt-Taiana Souza
(Portugal) Rosa Costa-Ana Freches
(Angola) Marlene Costa-Sara Kunga

=== Final Round ===
Semi-finals
18 July - Lisbon
(Brazil) Liliane Maestrini-Luana Madeira
(Brazil) Fabiane Boogaredt-Taiana Souza
18 July - Lisbon
(Portugal) Juliana Antunes-Francisca Esteves
(Portugal) Rosa Costa-Ana Freches

Final
19 July - Lisbon
(Brazil) Liliane Maestrini-Luana Madeira
(Portugal) Rosa Costa-Ana Freches
Third place
19 July - Lisbon
(Brazil) Fabiane Boogaredt-Taiana Souza
(Portugal) Juliana Antunes-Francisca Esteves

== See also ==
- Lusophony Games
- 2009 Lusophony Games
