= Michael Spence (athlete) =

American athlete

Personal information
- Born: May 20, 1978 (age 48)
- Education: East Stroudsburg High School; Princeton University

Sport
- Sport: Athletics
- Event: 3000 metres steeplechase
Medal record
Representing United States
Pan American Games
Silver medal – second place	2007 Rio de Janeiro	3000 m steeplechase

Michael Spence (born May 20, 1978) is an American former athlete who competed in long-distance running events.

Raised in East Stroudsburg, Pennsylvania, Spence attended East Stroudsburg High School and was a District 11 cross country champion, before taking up the steeplechase as a specialty while a varsity athlete at Princeton University. He won the 1997 USA junior steeplechase title and trained in Utah under Olympics coach Chick Hislop.

Spence was a silver medalist for the United States in the 3000 m steeplechase at the 2007 Pan American Games in Rio de Janeiro, behind countryman Joshua McAdams who passed him in the final lap. At the 2008 U.S. Olympic trials in Eugene, Oregon, Spence missed out on a place for Beijing after coming in sixth position.
