= Equatorial Guinea at the Lusofonia Games =

Equatorial Guinea is to date the only participating nation that failed to win any medals at the Lusophone Games. They were scheduled to appear in the inaugural tournament, but did not. They participated for the first time in the 2009 edition.

They are listed as having participated in the 2014 Lusophone Games, but they did not win any medals.
