= Table tennis at the 2009 Lusofonia Games =

The Table Tennis tournament of the 2009 Lusophony Games was played in Pavilhão Atlântico, Lisbon, Portugal. The tournament was played from 12 to 13 July 2009, and there was both the men's and women's competition with singles, doubles, and mixed doubles.

== Medal summary ==
Pos	Country	Gold	Silver	Bronze	Total
1	Portugal	2	2	1	5
2	Brazil	2	2		4
3	Macau			3	3
–	(Timor-Leste) East Timor				
–	India				
–	Sri Lanka				
–	Angola				
		4	4	4	12

== Male Singles ==
1st round	2nd round	Semifinals	Finals
(Portugal) André Silva
(Brazil) Humberto Junior	(Portugal) André Silva
(India) Noel Noronha	(India) Noel Noronha
(Macau) Tong Hou Iam		(Portugal) André Silva
(Angola) Bernando Quifica		(Macau) Hon Weng Vong
(Macau) Hon Weng Vong	(Macau) Hon Weng Vong
(Sri Lanka) Hasintha Marakkala	(Brazil) Paulo Rocha
(Brazil) Paulo Rocha			(Portugal) André Silva
(Brazil) Danilo Toma			(Portugal) Nuno Henriques
(Portugal) Nuno Henriques	(Portugal) Nuno Henriques
(Angola) Domingos Manuel	(Brazil) Vitaly Efimov
(Portugal) Vitaly Efimov		(Portugal) Nuno Henriques	Third place
(Angola) António Lemos		(Macau) Kin Wa Leong
(Macau) Hoi Va Chang	(Macau) Hoi Wa Chang		(Macau) Kin Wa Leong
(Sri Lanka) Dinesh Don Silva	(Macau) Kin Wa Leong		(Macau) Hon Weng Vong
(Macau) Kin Va Leong

== Female Singles ==
1st round	2nd round	Semifinals	Finals
(Brazil) Ligia Silva
(Macau) Weng I Chong	(Brazil) Ligia Silva
(India) Nyssa Alvares	(Portugal) Leila Oliveira
(Portugal) Leila Oliveira		(Brazil) Ligia Silva
(Angola) Jerusa Borges		(Brazil) Livia Mizobuchi
(Portugal) Diana Albuquerque	(Angola) Jerusa Borges
(India) Saloni Sirwaiker	(Brazil) Livia Mizobuchi
(Brazil) Livia Mizobuchi			(Brazil) Ligia Silva
(Portugal) Ana Cristina Neves			(Brazil) Mariany Nonaka
(India) Divya DMello	(Portugal) Ana Cristina Neves
(Macau) Sio Mei U	(Brazil) Caroline Kumahara
(Brazil) Caroline Kumahara		(Portugal) Ana Cristina Neves	Third place
(Macau) Chao In Ma		(Brazil) Mariany Nonaka
(Angola) Regina Samalinha	(Macau) Chao In Ma		(Brazil) Livia Mizobuchi
(Macau) Lai Wa Lam	(Brazil) Mariany Nonaka		(Portugal) Ana Cristina Neves
(Brazil) Mariany Nonaka

== Team competition – Male ==
=== First round ===
==== Group A ====
Rank	Team	Pld	W	L	GF	GA	GD
1	Brazil	2	2	0	6	0	6
2	Portugal	2	1	1	3	3	0
3	Timor-Leste	2	0	2	0	6	-6

Portugal	3 – 0	Timor-Leste
Brazil	3 – 0	Timor-Leste
Brazil	3 – 0	Portugal

==== Group B ====
Rank	Team	Pld	W	L	GF	GA	GD
1	Macau	2	2	0	6	1	5
2	Sri Lanka	2	1	1	4	5	-1
3	India	2	0	2	2	6	-4

India	2 – 3	Sri Lanka
Macau	3 – 1	Sri Lanka
Macau	3 – 0	India

=== Semi-finals ===
Portugal	3 – 0	Sri Lanka
Brazil	3 – 1	Macau

=== Finals ===
5th place	Timor-Leste	0 – 3	India
3rd place	Sri Lanka	2 – 3	Macau
Title	Portugal	3 – 2	Brazil

== Team competition – Female ==
=== First round ===
Rank	Team	Pld	W	L	GF	GA	GD
1	Brazil	4	4	0	12	2	11
2	Portugal	4	3	1	11	3	8
3	Macau	4	2	2	6	6	0
4	India	4	1	3	3	9	-6
5	Angola	4	0	4	0	12	-12

Portugal	3 – 0	Angola
Macau	3 – 0	India
Brazil	3 – 0	Angola
Portugal	3 – 0	India
Brazil	3 – 0	Macau
India	3 – 0	Angola
Portugal	3 – 0	Macau
Brazil	3 – 0	India
Macau	3 – 0	Angola
Brazil	3 – 2	Portugal

== See also ==
- ACOLOP
- Lusophony Games
- 2009 Lusophony Games
