= Ildar Minshin =

Russian steeplechase runner

Ildar Salikhovich Minshin (Russian: Ильдар Салихович Миншин; born 5 February 1985) is a Russian track and field athlete who mainly competes in the 3000 metres steeplechase.

He was banned for two years, starting 25 August 2016, due to abnormalities in his biological passport.

== International competitions ==
| Year | Competition | Venue | Position | Event | Notes |
Representing Russia
| 2007 | European U23 Championships | Debrecen, Hungary | 2nd | 3000 m steeplechase | 8:34.27 |
| 2007 | Universiade | Bangkok, Thailand | 14th (h) | 3000 m steeplechase | 8:46.57 |
| 2008 | Olympic Games | Beijing, China | 20th (sf) | 3000 m steeplechase | 8:26.85 |
| 2009 | European Team Championships | Leiria, Portugal | 3rd | 3000 m steeplechase | 8:34.06 |
| 2009 | World Championships | Berlin, Germany | 23rd (sf) | 3000 m steeplechase | 8:33.89 |
| 2010 | European Championships | Barcelona, Spain | 6th | 3000 m steeplechase | 8:24.87 |
| 2011 | European Team Championships | Stockholm, Sweden | 3rd | 3000 m steeplechase | 8:34.56 |
| 2011 | Universiade | Shenzhen, China | 3rd | 3000 m steeplechase | 8:34.86 |
| 2012 | European Championships | Helsinki, Finland | 21st (h) | 3000 m steeplechase | 8:52.84 |
| 2013 | Universiade | Kazan, Russia | 4th | 3000 m steeplechase | 8:44.11 |

== See also ==
- List of doping cases in athletics
