= Athletics at the 2007 Summer Universiade – Men's 3000 metres steeplechase =

The men's 3000 metres steeplechase event at the 2007 Summer Universiade was held on 11–13 August.

== Medalists ==
Gold	Silver	Bronze
Halil Akkaş; Turkey	Barnabas Kirui; Kenya	Ion Luchianov; Moldova

== Results ==
=== Heats ===
Qualification: First 4 of each heat (Q) and the next 4 fastest (q) qualified for the final.

Rank	Heat	Name	Nationality	Time	Notes
1	2	Ion Luchianov	Moldova	8:32.36	Q
2	2	Matteo Villani	Italy	8:32.45	Q, SB
3	2	Simon Ayeko	Uganda	8:33.60	Q
4	2	Itai Maggidi	Israel	8:33.98	Q
5	2	Tomasz Szymkowiak	Poland	8:34.15	q, SB
6	2	Augustus Maiyo	Kenya	8:34.28	q
7	2	Jermaine Mays	Great Britain	8:34.44	q
8	2	Andrey Farnosov	Russia	8:34.56	q
9	1	Barnabas Kirui	Kenya	8:39.33	Q
10	1	Halil Akkaş	Turkey	8:45.11	Q
11	1	Steffen Uliczka	Germany	8:45.34	Q
12	1	Víctor García	Spain	8:45.70	Q
13	1	Vadym Slobodenyuk	Ukraine	8:46.02	
14	1	Ildar Minshin	Russia	8:46.57	
15	1	Frank Tickner	Great Britain	8:49.82	
16	1	Pedro Ribeiro	Portugal	8:50.41	
17	1	Josafat González	Mexico	8:51.81	
18	1	Atsuro Kikuchi	Japan	8:56.73	
19	2	Albert Minczér	Hungary	8:57.07	
20	2	Liu Chao	China	8:57.62	
21	1	Liu Taiben	China	8:58.09	PB
22	2	Cene Šubic	Slovenia	9:03.41	
23	2	Lukhanyo Mabinza	South Africa	9:20.62	
24	2	Patikarn Pechsricha	Thailand	9:21.07	
25	1	James Wafakhale	Uganda	9:21.51	
26	2	Malaba Tchendo	Togo	9:23.06	SB
27	2	José Chaves	Costa Rica	9:29.68	
28	1	Benjamin Wolthers	Denmark	9:32.16	
29	1	Weerachai Sriboonram	Thailand	9:58.38	
	1	Tibor Végh	Hungary	DNS	
	2	Ali Abdallah	Sudan	DNS	

=== Final ===
Rank	Name	Nationality	Time	Notes
1st place, gold medalist(s)	Halil Akkaş	Turkey	8:20.83	GR
2nd place, silver medalist(s)	Barnabas Kirui	Kenya	8:22.67	
3rd place, bronze medalist(s)	Ion Luchianov	Moldova	8:23.83	
4	Steffen Uliczka	Germany	8:33.93	
5	Augustus Maiyo	Kenya	8:35.13	
6	Tomasz Szymkowiak	Poland	8:37.87	
7	Andrey Farnosov	Russia	8:38.69	
8	Matteo Villani	Italy	8:40.82	
9	Simon Ayeko	Uganda	8:42.09	
10	Jermaine Mays	Great Britain	8:43.12	
11	Itai Maggidi	Israel	8:43.75	
12	Víctor García	Spain	8:50.31	
