= Volleyball at the Lusofonia Games =

Volleyball at the Lusophone Games was first held in the first edition in Macau, in 2006 when three teams in each men and women's competitions played. Portugal, Macau and India participated in male competition and Portugal, Macau and East Timor took part in women's competitions.

== Men's tournament ==
Lusophone Games
Year	Host	Winner	Runner-up	3rd Place
2006; Details	Macau, China	Portugal	Macau	India
2009; Details	Lisbon, Portugal	Portugal	Macau	Cape Verde
2014; Details	Goa, India	India	Mozambique	Macau

=== Medals summary ===
Rank	Nation	Gold	Silver	Bronze	Total
1	Portugal	2	0	0	2
2	India	1	0	1	2
3	Macau	0	2	1	3
4	Mozambique	0	1	0	1
5	Cape Verde	0	0	1	1
Totals (5 entries)		3	3	3	9

== Women's tournament ==
Lusophone Games
Year	Host	Winner	Runner-up	3rd Place
2006; Details	Macau, China	Portugal	Macau	Timor-Leste
2009; Details	Lisbon, Portugal	Portugal	Macau	India
2014; Details	Goa, India	India	Macau	Mozambique

=== Medals summary ===
Rank	Nation	Gold	Silver	Bronze	Total
1	Portugal	2	0	0	2
2	India	1	0	1	2
3	Macau	0	3	0	3
4	Mozambique	0	0	1	1
4	Timor-Leste	0	0	1	1
Totals (5 entries)		3	3	3	9
