= Volleyball at the 2009 Lusofonia Games =

The Volleyball tournament of the 2009 Lusophone Games was played in Lisbon, Portugal. The venue was the Complexo Desportivo Municipal do Casal Vistoso. The tournament was played from 10 to 12 July 2009, and there are both men's and women's competition.

== Volleyball medal table by country ==
Pos	Country:	Gold	Silver	Bronze	Total:
1	Portugal	2	-	-	2
2	Macau	-	2	-	2
3	Cape Verde	-	-	1	1
3	India	-	-	1	1
	Total	2	2	2	6

== Male Competition ==
=== Semi-finals ===
Cape Verde	1 – 3	Macau
India	0 – 3	Portugal

=== Volleyball medal table male competition ===
Pos	Country:	Gold	Silver	Bronze	Total:
1	Portugal	1	-	-	1
2	Macau	-	1	-	1
3	Cape Verde	-	-	1	1
	Total	1	1	1	3

Portugal: Phelipe Martins Nuno Pereira Marcel Gil Ivo Casas Carlos Coelho Ricardo Silva Hugo Faria Alexandre Ferreira Nuno Silva Miguel Rebelo

Hugo Oliveira Pedro Figueiredo

== Female Competition ==
=== Round robin ===
Rank	Team	Pld	W	L	GF	GA	GD
1	Portugal	2	2	0	6	0	6
2	Macau	2	1	1	3	3	0
3	India	2	0	2	0	6	-6

India	0 – 3	Macau
Portugal	3 – 0	India
Macau	0 – 3	Portugal

=== Volleyball medal table female competition ===
Pos	Country:	Gold	Silver	Bronze	Total:
1	Portugal	1	-	-	1
2	Macau	-	1	-	1
3	India	-	-	1	1
	Total	1	1	1	3

== See also ==
- ACOLOP
- Lusophone Games
- 2009 Lusophone Games
