= Derek Scott (athlete) =

American distance runner and coach (born 1987)

Personal information
- Nationality: American
- Born: November 7, 1985 (age 40)

Sport
- Sport: Men's track and field
- Event: 3000 meters steeplechase
- College team: Cornerstone Golden Eagles
- Club: Team Indiana Elite

Achievements and titles
- Regional finals: 6th (2011 Pan American Games)
- Personal best: 8:31.52 min (2011)

Derek Scott (born November 7, 1985) is an American distance runner and coach. He was a finalist in the 3000 meters steeplechase at the 2011 Pan American Games, placing sixth. He ran for Cornerstone University's Golden Eagles athletic team and was the 2007 NAIA Champion in the 1500 meters.

Scott previously ran for Team Indiana Elite based out of Bloomington, Indiana and was coached by Robert Chapman. While at Cornerstone he was a ten-time All-American and twice national runner up – once in the indoor mile and the other in the steeplechase. As a freshman, he was placed second in the steeplechase at the United States Junior Track and Field Championships and represented his country in the event at the 2004 World Junior Championships in Athletics in Grosseto, Italy.

From 2010 till 2011 Scott was the distance coach for Liberty University when Sam Chelanga won the NCAA Men's Division I Cross Country Championship and the outdoor 5000 meters. In the steeplechase competition of the 2011 Pan American Games he placed sixth. He set a steeplechase personal record of 8:31.52 minutes to win at the Mt. SAC Relays, and the time ranked him ninth among Americans in the event that year.

At national level, Scott entered the 1500 meters at the 2009 USA Outdoor Track and Field Championships, but did not progress beyond the first round. He was the 2010 PUMA Mile Champion. In 2011 he was eighth in the 3000 meters final at the 2011 USA Indoor Track and Field Championships and was ninth in the steeplechase at the 2011 USA Outdoor Track and Field Championships. He placed 16th in the steeplechase at the 2012 United States Olympic Trials 3000 m steeplechase. He ran the 2014 Boston Marathon, finishing in two hours 32 minutes, in 110th place. He currently resides in Vancouver, Canada with his wife Bri and his sons Bennett and Jackson. He is the marketing director for the Stoko Corporation.

== International competitions ==
Year	Competition	Venue	Position	Event	Notes
2004	World Junior Championships	Grosseto, Italy	9th (h)	3000 m steeplechase	9:22.34
2011	Pan American Games	Guadalajara, Mexico	6th	3000 m steeplechase	8:55.03

== Personal records ==
- 800 m: 1:48.94 min, 2009
- 1500 m: 3:39.63 min, 2009
- Mile: 3:57.87 min, 2009
- 3000 m: 8:01.51 min, 2009 (indoor)
- Steeplechase: 8:31.52 min, 2011 (Mt. SAC Champion)
- 5000 m: 13:47.28 min, 2009
