= Athletics at the 2013 Summer Universiade – Men's 3000 metres steeplechase =

The men's 3000 metres steeplechase event at the 2013 Summer Universiade was held on 8–11 July.

== Medalists ==
Gold	Silver	Bronze
Ilgizar Safiullin; Russia	Sebastián Martos; Spain	Patrick Nasti; Italy

== Results ==
=== Heats ===
Qualification: First 4 in each heat (Q) and the next 4 fastest (q) qualified for the final.

Rank	Heat	Name	Nationality	Time	Notes
1	2	Ilgizar Safiullin	Russia	8:48.27	Q
2	1	Ildar Minshin	Russia	8:48.55	Q
3	1	Hakan Duvar	Turkey	8:49.06	Q
4	1	James Nipperess	Australia	8:49.12	Q
5	1	Sebastián Martos	Spain	8:49.52	Q
6	1	Justinas Beržanskis	Lithuania	8:49.87	q
7	2	Patrick Nasti	Italy	8:52.76	Q
8	2	Alexandru Ghinea	Romania	8:52.91	Q
9	2	Marco Kern	Switzerland	8:53.01	Q
10	2	Tomas Cotter	Ireland	8:53.30	q
11	1	Noam Neeman	Israel	8:53.33	q
12	1	Fredrik Johansson	Sweden	9:00.36	q, SB
13	2	Ryan Brockerville	Canada	9:00.60	
14	2	Allan Makweta	Uganda	9:05.14	
15	1	Priit Aus	Estonia	9:06.97	PB
16	1	Artem Kossinov	Kazakhstan	9:16.92	
17	2	Daniel Lundgren	Sweden	9:22.33	
18	2	Jonas Hammer	Norway	9:26.64	
19	1	Ali Raza	Pakistan	10:01.74	
20	1	Mehrubon Shamsidinov	Tajikistan	10:02.12	
	2	Anders Ludvigsen	Denmark	DNF	

=== Final ===
Rank	Name	Nationality	Time	Notes
1st place, gold medalist(s)	Ilgizar Safiullin	Russia	8:32.53	
2nd place, silver medalist(s)	Sebastián Martos	Spain	8:37.94	
3rd place, bronze medalist(s)	Patrick Nasti	Italy	8:38.41	
4	Ildar Minshin	Russia	8:44.11	
5	Noam Neeman	Israel	8:49.07	PB
6	Marco Kern	Switzerland	8:51.76	
7	Alexandru Ghinea	Romania	8:53.14	
8	Justinas Beržanskis	Lithuania	8:54.72	
9	Hakan Duvar	Turkey	8:57.69	
10	Tomas Cotter	Ireland	8:59.40	
11	Fredrik Johansson	Sweden	9:03.51	
12	James Nipperess	Australia	9:17.10	
