= Athletics at the 2007 Pan American Games – Men's 3000 metres steeplechase =

Men's 3,000 metres steeplechase at the Pan American Games

The men's 3000 metres steeplechase event at the 2007 Pan American Games was held on July 28.

== Results ==
Rank	Name	Nationality	Time	Notes
1st place, gold medalist(s)	Joshua McAdams	United States	8:30.49	
2nd place, silver medalist(s)	Michael Spence	United States	8:32.11	
3rd place, bronze medalist(s)	José Alberto Sánchez	Cuba	8:36.07	PB
4	Gladson Barbosa	Brazil	8:40.32	
5	Mario Bazan	Peru	8:44.70	PB
6	Celso Ficagna	Brazil	8:45.94	
7	Santiago Figueroa	Argentina	8:46.06	
8	Alexander Greaux	Puerto Rico	8:59.47	
9	Diego Moreno	Peru	9:01.08	
10	Sergio Lobos	Chile	9:08.55	
