= Albert Minczér =

Hungarian runner

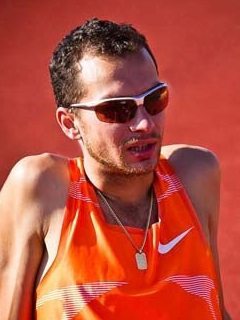
- Albert Minczér in 2012

Personal information
- Born: October 1, 1986 (age 39)

Sport
- Country: Hungary
- Sport: Athletics

Albert Minczér (born 1 October 1986, in Esztergom) is a Hungarian athlete. He competed in the 3000 m steeplechase event at the 2012 Summer Olympics.

== Competition record ==
| Year | Competition | Venue | Position | Event | Notes |
Representing Hungary
| 2003 | World Youth Championships | Sherbrooke, Canada | 14th (h) | 2000 m s'chase | 6:05.42 |
| 2004 | World Junior Championships | Grosseto, Italy | 19th (h) | 3000 m s'chase | 9:00.59 |
| 2005 | European Junior Championships | Kaunas, Lithuania | 2nd | 3000 m s'chase | 8:45.82 |
| 2007 | European U23 Championships | Debrecen, Hungary | — | 3000m steeplechase | DQ |
| 2007 | Universiade | Bangkok, Thailand | 19th (h) | 3000 m s'chase | 8:45.82 |
| 2009 | European Indoor Championships | Turin, Italy | 12th | 3000 m | 8:10.55 |
| 2011 | Universiade | Shenzhen, China | 15th (h) | 3000 m s'chase | 9:18.56 |
| 2012 | Olympic Games | London, United Kingdom | 31st (h) | 3000 m s'chase | 8:40.74 |
| 2013 | European Indoor Championships | Gothenburg, Sweden | 19th (h) | 3000 m | 8:17.25 |
| 2014 | European Championships | Zürich, Switzerland | 27th (h) | 3000 m s'chase | 9:32.13 |
