= Athletics at the 2005 Summer Universiade – Men's 3000 metres steeplechase =

The men's 3000 metres steeplechase event at the 2005 Summer Universiade was held on 17 August in İzmir, Turkey.

== Results ==
Rank	Athlete	Nationality	Time	Notes
1st place, gold medalist(s)	Halil Akkaş	Turkey	8:30.16	
2nd place, silver medalist(s)	Ion Luchianov	Moldova	8:30.66	
3rd place, bronze medalist(s)	Ruben Ramolefi	South Africa	8:31.53	
4	Luke Gunn	Great Britain	8:32.87	SB
5	Andrey Farnosov	Russia	8:34.11	
6	Vadym Slobodenyuk	Ukraine	8:34.41	
7	Barnabas Kirui	Kenya	8:42.62	SB
8	Kristjan Hunter	Canada	8:44.94	
9	Vincent Zouaoui-Dandrieux	France	9:02.62	
10	Cene Šubic	Slovenia	9:04.64	
11	Mark Buckingham	Great Britain	9:07.56	
12	Liang Xiao	China	9:14.00	
13	Ma Yinghu	China	9:15.61	SB
14	Stuart Kerr	New Zealand	9:17.10	
	Richard Jeremiah	Australia	DNF	
	Vincent Rono	Kenya	DNF	
	Eugene O'Neill	Ireland	DNS	
