= Taekwondo at the Lusofonia Games =

Taekwondo competition

The Taekwondo tournament is held since 2006. The first Games only saw the participation of the men's event.

== Winners ==
=== Men's tournament ===
-58 kg

- 2009: Portugal Pedro Póvoa
- 2006: Brazil Gilvan Santos

-68 kg

- 2009: India Chandan Lakra
- 2006: Brazil Marcos Gonçalves

-80 kg

- 2009: São Tomé and Príncipe Eloy Boa Morte
- 2006: Brazil Douglas Marcelino

+80 kg

- 2009: Brazil José Kuntgner
- 2006: Brazil L. dos Santos

=== Women's tournament ===
-49 kg

- 2009: Brazil Fernanda Silva

-57 kg

- 2009: Portugal Ana Rita Lopes

-67 kg

- 2009: Brazil Raphaella Pereira

+67 kg

- 2009: Macau Junnan Wang
