= 2011 European Athletics U23 Championships – Men's 3000 metres steeplechase =

The Men's 3000 metres steeplechase event at the 2011 European Athletics U23 Championships was held in Ostrava, Czech Republic, at Městský stadion on 15 and 17 July.

== Medalists ==
Gold	Sebastián Martos; Spain
Silver	Abdelaziz Merzougui; Spain
Bronze	Alexandru Ghinea; Romania

== Results ==
=== Final ===
17 July 2011 / 17:40

Rank	Name	Nationality	Time	Notes
1st place, gold medalist(s)	Sebastián Martos	Spain	8:35.35	
2nd place, silver medalist(s)	Abdelaziz Merzougui	Spain	8:36.21	
3rd place, bronze medalist(s)	Alexandru Ghinea	Romania	8:38.51	
4	Antonio Abadía	Spain	8:41.82	
5	Patrick Nasti	Italy	8:42.37	PB
6	Tanguy Pepiot	France	8:43.48	
7	Krystian Zalewski	Poland	8:45.33	
8	Tom Erling Kårbø	Norway	8:46.96	
9	Eric Senorski	Sweden	8:50.02	
10	Łukasz Oślizło	Poland	8:52.38	
11	Benedikt Karus	Germany	8:56.80	
12	Hakan Duvar	Turkey	9:05.66	

Intermediate times:
1000m: 2:55.80 Patrick Nasti Italy
2000m: 5:49.20 Eric Senorski Sweden

=== Heats ===
Qualified: First 4 in each heat (Q) and 4 best performers (q) advance to the Final

==== Summary ====
Rank	Name	Nationality	Time	Notes
1	Łukasz Oślizło	Poland	8:38.28	Q PB
2	Tanguy Pepiot	France	8:41.04	Q
3	Abdelaziz Merzougui	Spain	8:41.90	Q
4	Antonio Abadía	Spain	8:41.94	Q
5	Patrick Nasti	Italy	8:42.16	q PB
6	Tom Erling Kårbø	Norway	8:42.40	Q PB
7	Alexandru Ghinea	Romania	8:42.48	Q
8	Sebastián Martos	Spain	8:42.71	Q
9	Krystian Zalewski	Poland	8:42.72	Q
10	Benedikt Karus	Germany	8:42.97	q
11	Eric Senorski	Sweden	8:45.78	q
12	Hakan Duvar	Turkey	8:49.35	q
13	Kaur Kivistik	Estonia	8:53.15	NR
14	Benjamin André	France	8:54.85	
15	Jacek Żądło	Poland	8:55.90	
16	Andrea Scoleri	Italy	8:56.75	
17	Daniel Gregório	Portugal	8:57.66	
18	Andreas Åhwall	Sweden	9:01.06	
19	David Flynn	Ireland	9:04.60	
20	Sait Özdemir	Turkey	9:07.47	
21	Yuriy Kishchenko	Ukraine	9:10.53	
22	Paulo Lopes	Portugal	9:11.26	
23	Ole Hesselbjerg	Denmark	9:16.81	
	Abdelatif Hadjam	France	DNF	

==== Details ====
===== Heat 1 =====
15 July 2011 / 11:45

Rank	Name	Nationality	Time	Notes
1	Tom Erling Kårbø	Norway	8:42.40	Q PB
2	Alexandru Ghinea	Romania	8:42.48	Q
3	Sebastián Martos	Spain	8:42.71	Q
4	Krystian Zalewski	Poland	8:42.72	Q
5	Benedikt Karus	Germany	8:42.97	q
6	Hakan Duvar	Turkey	8:49.35	q
7	Kaur Kivistik	Estonia	8:53.15	NR
8	Benjamin André	France	8:54.85	
9	Andrea Scoleri	Italy	8:56.75	
10	Andreas Åhwall	Sweden	9:01.06	
11	Yuriy Kishchenko	Ukraine	9:10.53	
12	Paulo Lopes	Portugal	9:11.26	

Intermediate times:
1000m: 2:56.17 Alexandru Ghinea Romania
2000m: 5:57.95 Alexandru Ghinea Romania

===== Heat 2 =====
15 July 2011 / 12:00

Rank	Name	Nationality	Time	Notes
1	Łukasz Oślizło	Poland	8:38.28	Q PB
2	Tanguy Pepiot	France	8:41.04	Q
3	Abdelaziz Merzougui	Spain	8:41.90	Q
4	Antonio Abadía	Spain	8:41.94	Q
5	Patrick Nasti	Italy	8:42.16	q PB
6	Eric Senorski	Sweden	8:45.78	q
7	Jacek Żądło	Poland	8:55.90	
8	Daniel Gregório	Portugal	8:57.66	
9	David Flynn	Ireland	9:04.60	
10	Sait Özdemir	Turkey	9:07.47	
11	Ole Hesselbjerg	Denmark	9:16.81	
	Abdelatif Hadjam	France	DNF	

Intermediate times:
1000m: 2:53.13 Eric Senorski Sweden
2000m: 5:49.02 Eric Senorski Sweden

== Participation ==
According to an unofficial count, 24 athletes from 14 countries participated in the event.

- Denmark (1)
- Estonia (1)
- France (3)
- Germany (1)
- Ireland (1)
- Italy (2)
- Norway (1)
- Poland (3)
- Portugal (2)
- Romania (1)
- Spain (3)
- Sweden (2)
- Turkey (2)
- Ukraine (1)
