= Andrey Farnosov =

Russian track and field athlete

Andrey Vasilievich Farnosov (Russian: Андрей Васильевич Фарносов; born 9 July 1980) is a Russian track and field athlete who mainly competes in the 3000 metres steeplechase.

== International competitions ==
Year	Competition	Venue	Position	Event	Notes
Representing Russia
2005	Universiade	İzmir, Turkey	5th	3000 m steeplechase	8:34.11
2006	European Championships	Gothenburg, Sweden	17th (sf)	3000 m steeplechase	8:36.94
2007	Universiade	Bangkok, Thailand	7th	3000 m steeplechase	8:38.69
2010	European Championships	Barcelona, Spain	11th	3000 m steeplechase	8:37.52
2011	World Championships	Daegu, South Korea	23rd (h)	3000 m steeplechase	8:34.44
2014	European Championships	Zurich, Switzerland	16th (h)	3000 m steeplechase	8:37.31
