= José Alberto Sánchez =

Cuban athlete (born 1986)

Personal information
- Full name: José Alberto Sánchez Cairo
- Born: September 2, 1986 (age 39) Corralillo, Villa Clara, Cuba

Sport
- Country: Cuba
- Sport: Athletics
- Event: Steeplechase runner

Achievements and titles
- Personal best: 3000 m steeplechase: 8:26.16 (2009)
Medal record
Pan American Games
Bronze medal – third place	2011 Guadalajara	3000 m st
CAC Championships
Silver medal – second place	2005 Nassau	3000 m st

José Alberto Sánchez Cairo (2 September 1986) is a Cuban athlete who competes mainly in the steeplechase, with his best results in the 3000 metres steeplechase. He last competed in 2018.

== Personal bests ==
- 1500 metres: 3:45.13 min – (Spain) Huelva, 9 June 2010
- 3000 metres: 8:13.63 min – (Guadeloupe) / (France) Baie-Mahault, 1 May 2010
- 5000 metres: 14:10.77 min – (Cuba) Havana, 25 April 2009
- 3000 metres steeplechase: 8:26.16 min NR – (Cuba) Havana, 19 June 2009

== Competition record ==
Year	Competition	Venue	Position	Event	Notes
Representing Cuba
2005	ALBA Games	Havana, Cuba	1st	3000 metres steeplechase	8:56.00 min
2005	Central American and Caribbean Championships	Nassau, Bahamas	2nd	3000 m steeplechase	9:07.44 min
2005	Pan American Junior Championships	Windsor, Canada	1st	3000 m steeplechase	8:43.96 min
2006	NACAC U23 Championships	Santo Domingo, Dominican Republic	1st	3000 m steeplechase	9:06.42 min
2006	Central American and Caribbean Games	Cartagena, Colombia	3rd	3000 m steeplechase	8:46.05 min
2007	ALBA Games	Caracas, Venezuela	1st	3000 m steeplechase	8:49.12 min
2007	Pan American Games	Rio de Janeiro, Brazil	3rd	3000 m steeplechase	8:36.07 min
2008	Central American and Caribbean Championships	Cali, Colombia	1st	3000 m steeplechase	8:53.24 min
2009	ALBA Games	Havana, Cuba	1st	3000 m steeplechase	8:40.87 min
2009	Central American and Caribbean Championships	Havana, Cuba	1st	5000 metres	14:23.73 min
2009	Central American and Caribbean Championships	Havana, Cuba	1st	3000 m steeplechase	8:30.08 min
2010	Ibero-American Championships in Athletics	San Fernando, Spain	1st	3000 m steeplechase	8:31.80 min
2011	Pan American Games	Guadalajara, Mexico	3rd	3000 m steeplechase	8:49.75 min

== See also ==
- List of Central American and Caribbean Championships records
