= Basketball at the 2009 Lusofonia Games =

The Basketball tournament of the 2009 Lusophony Games was played in Lisbon, Portugal. The venue was the Complexo dos Desportos de Almada. The tournament was played from 11 to 19 July 2009, and there are both men's and women's competition.

== Male Competition ==
=== Preliminary ===
| J1 | Guinea-Bissau | 68 - 62 | Mozambique |
| J2 | Macau | 107 - 77 | São Tomé and Príncipe |

=== Group A ===
| Rank | Team | Pts | Pld | W | L | GF | GA | GD |
|---|---|---|---|---|---|---|---|---|
| 1 | Portugal | 4 | 2 | 2 | 0 | 195 | 114 | 81 |
| 2 | Angola | 3 | 2 | 1 | 1 | 218 | 115 | 103 |
| 3 | Macau | 2 | 2 | 0 | 2 | 76 | 260 | -184 |

| Portugal | 81 - 72 | Angola |
| Angola | 146 - 34 | Macau |
| Portugal | 114 - 42 | Macau |

=== Group B ===
| Rank | Team | Pts | Pld | W | L | GF | GA | GD |
|---|---|---|---|---|---|---|---|---|
| 1 | Brazil | 4 | 2 | 2 | 0 | 195 | 118 | 77 |
| 2 | Cape Verde | 3 | 2 | 1 | 1 | 159 | 164 | -5 |
| 3 | Guinea-Bissau | 2 | 2 | 0 | 1 | 120 | 192 | -72 |

| Brazil | 90 - 72 | Cape Verde |
| Cape Verde | 87 - 74 | Guinea-Bissau |
| Brazil | 105 - 46 | Guinea-Bissau |

=== 7th place ===
| Mozambique | 100 - 52 | São Tomé and Príncipe |

=== 5th place ===
| Macau | 57 - 103 | Guinea-Bissau |

=== Knockout stage ===
Semi-finals
18 July
Angola | 80
Brazil | 71
18 July
Portugal | 66
Cape Verde | 67

Final
19 July
Angola | 106
Cape Verde | 64
Third place
19 July
Portugal | 95
Brazil | 71

=== Male Basketball medal table by country ===
| Pos | Country: | Gold | Silver | Bronze | Total: |
|---|---|---|---|---|---|
| 1 | Angola | 1 | - | - | 1 |
| 2 | Cape Verde | - | 1 | - | 1 |
| 3 | Portugal | - | - | 1 | 1 |
| | | | | | 3 |

== Female Competition ==
=== Round Robin ===
| Rank | Team | Pts | Pld | W | L | PF | PA | PD |
|---|---|---|---|---|---|---|---|---|
| 1 | Portugal | 8 | 4 | 4 | 0 | 251 | 204 | 47 |
| 2 | Brazil | 7 | 4 | 3 | 1 | 235 | 186 | 49 |
| 3 | Angola | 6 | 4 | 2 | 2 | 244 | 200 | 44 |
| 4 | Mozambique | 5 | 4 | 1 | 3 | 256 | 246 | 10 |
| 5 | Cape Verde | 4 | 4 | 0 | 4 | 137 | 287 | -150 |

| Angola | 53 - 60 | Portugal |
| Brazil | 74 - 21 | Cape Verde |
| Angola | 71 - 22 | Cape Verde |
| Portugal | 71 - 62 | Mozambique |
| Brazil | 58 - 53 | Mozambique |
| Cape Verde | 42 - 63 | Portugal |
| Cape Verde | 52 - 79 | Mozambique |
| Angola | 55 - 56 | Brazil |
| Angola | 65 - 62 | Mozambique |
| Portugal | 57 - 47 | Brazil |

=== Female Basketball medal table by country ===
| Pos | Country: | Gold | Silver | Bronze | Total: |
|---|---|---|---|---|---|
| 1 | Portugal | 1 | - | - | 1 |
| 2 | Brazil | - | 1 | - | 1 |
| 3 | Angola | - | - | 1 | 1 |
| | | | | | 3 |

== See also ==
- ACOLOP
- Lusophony Games
- 2009 Lusophony Games
