= Athletics at the 2009 Summer Universiade – Men's 3000 metres steeplechase =

The men's 3000 metres steeplechase event at the 2009 Summer Universiade was held on 8–11 July.

The winning margin was 0.01 seconds which as of 2024 remains the only time the men's 3,000 metres steeplechase has been won at these games by less than a tenth of a second.

== Medalists ==
Gold	Silver	Bronze
Ion Luchianov; Moldova	Halil Akkaş; Turkey	Steffen Uliczka; Germany

== Results ==
=== Heats ===
Qualification: First 4 of each heat (Q) and the next 4 fastest (q) qualified for the final.

Rank	Heat	Name	Nationality	Time	Notes
1	1	Rabia Makhloufi	Algeria	8:39.57	Q
2	1	Ion Luchianov	Moldova	8:40.57	Q
3	1	Steffen Uliczka	Germany	8:40.92	Q
4	1	Alberto Paulo	Portugal	8:41.03	Q
5	1	Vitaliy Nevyantsev	Russia	8:44.76	q
6	2	Edwin Molepo	South Africa	8:56.51	Q
7	1	Alex Genest	Canada	8:57.43	q
8	2	Pedro Ribeiro	Portugal	9:00.12	Q
9	2	Boris Zakharov	Russia	9:02.54	Q
10	2	Halil Akkaş	Turkey	9:03.61	Q
11	2	Joonas Harjamaki	Finland	9:05.06	q
12	1	Blaž Grad	Slovenia	9:25.95	q
13	1	Miloš Vučković	Serbia	9:31.34	
14	2	Malaba Tchendo	Togo	9:34.62	
15	2	Abdo Helou	Lebanon	12:30.72	
	2	Peter Mikulenka	Czech Republic	DNS	

=== Final ===
Rank	Name	Nationality	Time	Notes
1st place, gold medalist(s)	Ion Luchianov	Moldova	8:25.79	SB
2nd place, silver medalist(s)	Halil Akkaş	Turkey	8:25.80	SB
3rd place, bronze medalist(s)	Steffen Uliczka	Germany	8:26.18	SB
4	Alex Genest	Canada	8:27.53	
5	Rabia Makhloufi	Algeria	8:28.43	
6	Alberto Paulo	Portugal	8:29.86	SB
7	Edwin Molepo	South Africa	8:35.43	
8	Pedro Ribeiro	Portugal	8:36.14	SB
9	Joonas Harjamaki	Finland	8:40.74	PB
10	Vitaliy Nevyantsev	Russia	8:41.30	
11	Boris Zakharov	Russia	8:51.45	
12	Blaž Grad	Slovenia	9:35.46	
