= CPLP Games =

Multinational multi-sport event

- Status: active
- Genre: sports event
- Frequency: biannual
- Location: various
- Inaugurated: 1992

The CPLP Games (Portuguese: Jogos da CPLP, sometimes translated as "Youth Lusofonia Games" or "Lusofonia Youth Games") is a multinational multi-sport event organized by the Community of Portuguese Language Countries (CPLP), which involves athletes coming from Lusophone (Portuguese-speaking) countries that are less than 16 years old.

This event is similar in concept to the Lusophone Games, but for younger athletes.

== Editions ==
Not held in 2020 and 2022.

Edition	Year	Host city	Date	Athletes	Participants
1	1992	(Portugal) Lisbon		500	
2	1995	(Guinea-Bissau) Bissau		300	
3	1997	(Mozambique) Maputo		500	
4	2002	(Cape Verde) Praia	Jul 20 – 28	470	
5	2005	(Angola) Luanda	Aug 12 – 18	575	Angola, Brazil, Cape Verde, Guinea Bissau, Mozambique, Portugal
6	2008	(Brazil) Rio de Janeiro	Jul 27 – Aug 2	600	Angola, Brazil, Cape Verde, Guinea Bissau, Mozambique, Portugal
7	2010	(Mozambique) Maputo	Jul 29 – Aug 7		Angola, Brazil, Cape Verde, East Timor, Guinea Bissau, Mozambique, Portugal, São Tomé and Príncipe
8	2012	(Portugal) Mafra	Jul 7 – 15		Angola, Brazil, Cape Verde, East Timor, Guinea Bissau, Mozambique, Portugal, São Tomé and Príncipe
9	2014	(Angola) Luanda	Jul 23 – Aug 3		Angola, Brazil, Cape Verde, East Timor, Guinea Bissau, Mozambique, Portugal, São Tomé and Príncipe
10	2016	Sal, Cape Verde	Jul 17 – Jul 24		Angola, Brazil, Cape Verde, East Timor, Mozambique, Portugal, São Tomé and Príncipe
11	2018	(São Tomé and Príncipe) São Tomé Island	Jul 21 – Jul 28		
12	2025	(Timor-Leste) Dili	Jul 17 – Jul 27		Angola, Cape Verde, East Timor, Mozambique, Portugal, São Tomé and Príncipe

== Medal table ==
Year City	Edition	1st	2nd	3rd	4th	5th	6th	7th
1992; Lisbon	I							
1995; Bissau	II							
1997; Maputo	III							
2002; Praia	IV	Portugal						
2005; Luanda	V	Brazil; 15; 4; 3	Angola; 5; 6; 6	Cape Verde; 5; 6; 3	Portugal; 2; 5; 3	Guinea Bissau; 1; 4; 5	Sao Tome 2; 1	Mozambique 2
2008; Rio	VI	Brazil; 7; 6; 2	Angola; 3; 3; 3	Portugal; 3; 1; 1	Mozambique 2; 3	Guinea Bissau 1; 2	Cape Verde 2	
2010; Maputo	VII	Brazil; 18; 9; 1	Portugal; 9; 7; 6	Angola; 3; 8; 6	Mozambique; 1; 5; 11	Guinea Bissau; 1; 2; 3	Cape Verde 2; 1	
2012; Mafra	VIII	Portugal; 17; 6; 4	Brazil; 7; 11; 5	Mozambique; 2; 6; 7	Angola; 1; 2; 8	Cape Verde 1; 3	East Timor 1	Sao Tome
2014; Luanda	IX	Brazil; 26; 10; 13	Portugal; 12; 20; 12	Angola; 6; 11; 16	Mozambique; 6; 5; 9	Cape Verde 3; 4	Sao Tome 1; 2	East Timor

=== Participating nations ===
In the first edition, the nations that have participated are as follows:

- Portugal
- Angola
- Mozambique
- Cape Verde
- Guinea-Bissau
- São Tomé and Príncipe

In Maputo 1997, Brazil entered the competition, but in Praia 2002 it did not participate. Luanda 2005 saw the return of Brazil.

In 2008, the CPLP Games saw all the possible participating nations competing in Rio de Janeiro, after East Timor participated for the first time, plus Macau (PR China) that was invited to be present.

== Sports ==
So far, there are no regulations specifying which sports must be included in the Games schedule. In the 2025 edition, the list of sports included:

- 3x3 basketball
- Athletics
- Beach volleyball
- Chess
- Disabled athletic
- Football
- Karate
- Taekwondo
- Tennis

== See also ==
- ACOLOP
