= Ilgizar Safiullin =

Russian middle-distance runner

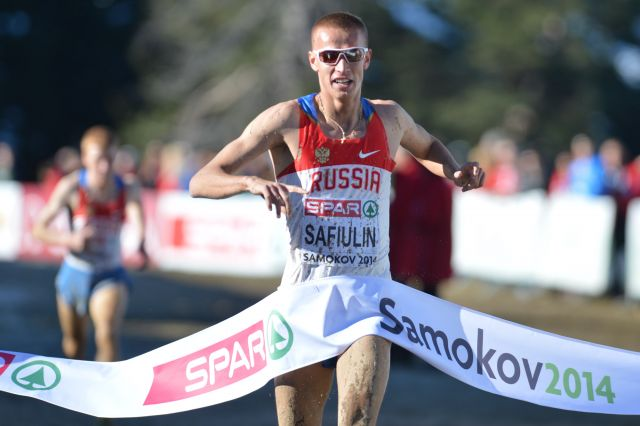
- Ilgizar Safiullin in 2014

Personal information
- Born: 9 December 1992 (age 33) Artyom, Russia
- Education: Far Eastern Federal University
- Height: 1.91 m (6 ft 3 in)
- Weight: 70 kg (154 lb)

Sport
- Sport: Athletics
- Event: 3000 m steeplechase

Ilgizar Ilgizovich Safiullin (Russian: Ильгизар Ильгизович Сафиуллин; born 9 December 1992) is a Russian athlete who specialises in the 3000 metres steeplechase. He represented his country at the 2013 and 2015 World Championships without qualifying for the final. In addition he won the gold medal at the 2013 Summer Universiade.

He is an ethnic Tatar.

== Competition record ==
Year	Competition	Venue	Position	Event	Notes
Representing Russia
2009	European Youth Olympic Festival	Tampere, Finland	3rd	3000 m	8:32.53
2010	World Junior Championships	Moncton, Canada	25th (h)	3000 m s'chase	9:15.35
2011	European Junior Championships	Tallinn, Estonia	1st	3000 m s'chase	8:37.94
2013	Universiade	Kazan, Russia	1st	3000 m s'chase	8:32.53
2013	World Championships	Moscow, Russia	21st (h)	3000 m s'chase	8:28.65
2015	World Championships	Beijing, China	16th (h)	3000 m s'chase	8:39.58

== Personal bests ==
Outdoor

- 3000 metres – 8:32.53 (Tampere 2009)
- 3000 metres steeplechase – 8:18.49 (Paris 2015)

Indoor

- 1500 metres – 3:45.26 (Moscow 2012)
- 3000 metres – 7:54.90 (Moscow 2013)
