= Football at the 2009 Lusofonia Games =

The Football tournament of the 2009 Lusophony Games was played in Lisbon, Portugal. The venue was the Estádio José Gomes and Estádio Nacional. The tournament was played from 11 to 19 July 2009, and there was just the men's competition.

== Football medal table by country ==
Rank	Nation	Gold	Silver	Bronze	Total
1	Cape Verde	1	0	0	1
2	Portugal	0	1	0	1
3	Angola	0	0	1	1
Totals (3 entries)		1	1	1	3

== Men's competition ==
=== Round Robin ===
Pos	Team	Pld	W	D	L	GF	GA	GD	Pts
1	Cape Verde	4	3	1	0	11	2	+9	10
2	Portugal	4	3	0	1	13	3	+10	9
3	Angola	4	2	1	1	9	5	+4	7
4	Mozambique	4	1	0	3	3	9	−6	3
5	India	4	0	0	4	2	18	−16	0

India	0 - 2	Mozambique
Cape Verde	1 - 0	Portugal
Mozambique	0 - 5	Angola
Cape Verde	7 - 1	India
Portugal	2 - 0	Mozambique
India	0 - 2	Angola
Cape Verde	1 - 1	Angola
India	1 - 7	Portugal
Portugal	4 - 1	Angola
Cape Verde	2 - 0	Mozambique

== See also ==
- ACOLOP
- Lusophony Games
- 2009 Lusophony Games
