= Pedro Póvoa =

Portuguese taekwondo practitioner

Personal information
- Full name: Pedro Miguel Moreira Póvoa
- Nationality: Portugal
- Born: 27 May 1980 (age 46) Porto, Portugal
- Height: 1.65 m (5 ft 5 in)
- Weight: 58 kg (128 lb)

Sport
- Sport: Taekwondo
- Event: 58 kg
- Club: Boavista
Medal record
Men's taekwondo
Representing Portugal
European Championships
Bronze medal – third place	2004 Lillehammer	58 kg
Lusophony Games
Gold medal – first place	2009 Lisbon	58 kg

Pedro Miguel Moreira Póvoa (born 27 May 1980 in Porto) is a retired Portuguese taekwondo practitioner. He won a bronze medal for the 54 kg class at the 2004 European Taekwondo Championships in Lillehammer, Norway.

Povoa qualified for the men's 58 kg class at the 2008 Summer Olympics in Beijing, after winning his division from the European Qualification Tournament in Istanbul, Turkey. He lost the preliminary round of sixteen match to Dominican Republic's Gabriel Mercedes, who was able to score three points at the end of the game. Because his opponent advanced further into the final match, Povoa offered another shot for the bronze medal through the repechage bout, where he was defeated by Taiwanese taekwondo jin and defending Olympic champion Chu Mu-yen, with a score of (−1)–1.
