= 2007 European Athletics U23 Championships – Men's 3000 metres steeplechase =

The men's 3000 metres steeplechase event at the 2007 European Athletics U23 Championships was held in Debrecen, Hungary, at Gyulai István Atlétikai Stadion on 13 and 15 July.

== Medalists ==
Gold	Mahiedine Mekhissi-Benabbad; France
Silver	Ildar Minshin; Russia
Bronze	Balázs Ott; Hungary

== Results ==
=== Final ===
15 July

Rank	Name	Nationality	Time	Notes
1st place, gold medalist(s)	Mahiedine Mekhissi-Benabbad	France	8:33.91	
2nd place, silver medalist(s)	Ildar Minshin	Russia	8:34.27	
3rd place, bronze medalist(s)	Balázs Ott	Hungary	8:35.04	
4	Víctor García	Spain	8:36.62	
5	Marcin Chabowski	Poland	8:37.34	
6	Luke Gunn	United Kingdom	8:37.54	
7	Alberto Paulo	Portugal	8:38.76	
8	Pyotr Ivanenko	Russia	8:41.03	
9	Mateusz Demczyszak	Poland	8:55.30	
10	Valērijs Žolnerovičs	Latvia	9:08.39	
11	Yoann Kowal	France	9:41.75	
	Łukasz Parszczyński	Poland	DQ	IAAF Rule 163.2

=== Heats ===
13 July
Qualified: first 4 in each heat and 4 best to the Final

==== Heat 1 ====
Rank	Name	Nationality	Time	Notes
1	Yoann Kowal	France	8:36.11	Q
2	Valērijs Žolnerovičs	Latvia	8:36.23	Q
3	Mahiedine Mekhissi-Benabbad	France	8:36.62	Q
4	Marcin Chabowski	Poland	8:36.73	Q
5	Alberto Paulo	Portugal	8:36.98	q
6	Luke Gunn	United Kingdom	8:37.60	q
7	Pyotr Ivanenko	Russia	8:39.12	q
9	Cene Šubic	Slovenia	8:52.81	
9	José Luis Galván	Spain	8:53.12	
10	Daniel Lundgren	Sweden	9:08.81	
	László Tóth	Hungary	DNF	

==== Heat 2 ====
Rank	Name	Nationality	Time	Notes
1	Łukasz Parszczyński	Poland	8:37.93	Q
2	Balázs Ott	Hungary	8:38.67	Q
3	Ildar Minshin	Russia	8:38.80	Q
4	Víctor García	Spain	8:38.95	Q
5	Mateusz Demczyszak	Poland	8:39.82	q
6	Timothée Bommier	France	8:41.16	
7	Antonio del Caño	Spain	9:02.56	
8	Panayiotis Kokoros	Greece	9:06.69	
9	Zdeněk Medlík	Czech Republic	9:15.61	
	Albert Minczér	Hungary	DQ	IAAF Rule 169.7

== Participation ==
According to an unofficial count, 21 athletes from 12 countries participated in the event.

- Czech Republic (1)
- France (3)
- Greece (1)
- Hungary (3)
- Latvia (1)
- Poland (3)
- Portugal (1)
- Russia (2)
- Slovenia (1)
- Spain (3)
- Sweden (1)
- United Kingdom (1)
