= Alex Genest =

Canadian runner

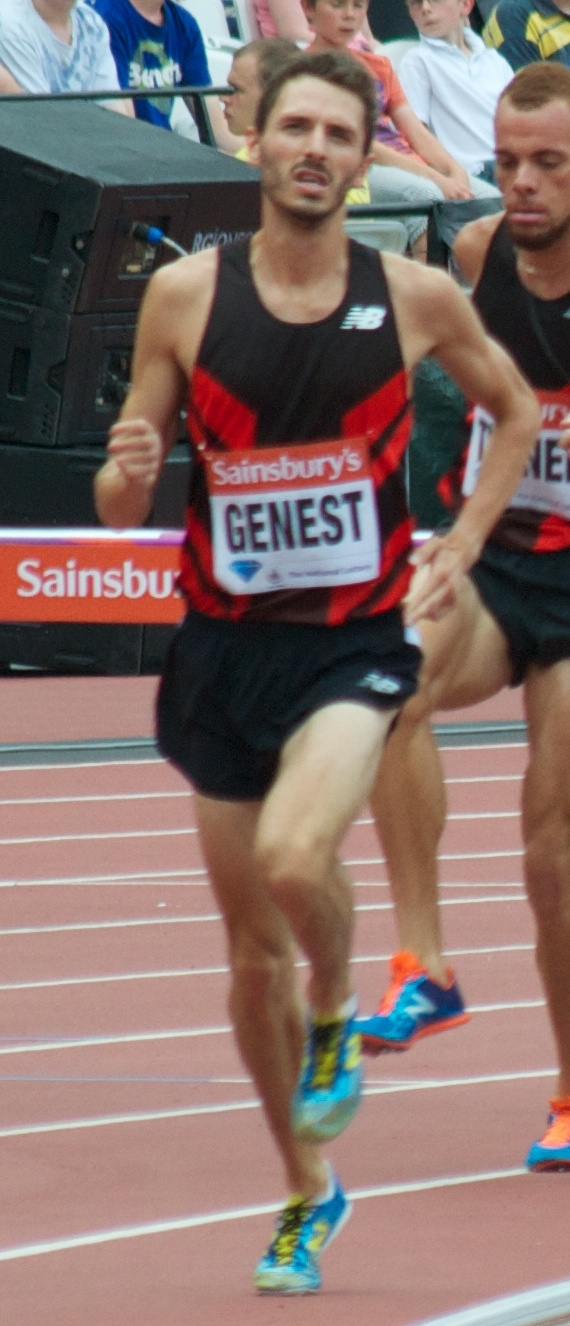
- Genest in 2013

Personal information
- Full name: Alexandre Genest
- Born: June 30, 1986 (age 40) Shawinigan, Quebec, Canada
- Height: 5 ft 10 in (178 cm)
- Weight: 130 lb (59 kg)

Sport
- Sport: Running
- Event: Steeplechase
- College team: Université de Sherbrooke, University of Guelph
- Club: Speed River Track Club
Medal record
Men's athletics
Representing Canada
Pan American Games
| Silver medal – second place | 2015 Toronto | 3,000 m st. |

Alexandre Genest (born June 30, 1986) is a Canadian middle- and long-distance runner. He qualified for the 2012 London Olympics in the 3000 metre steeplechase with an A standard time and a first-place finish at the 2012 Canadian Olympics field & track trials in Calgary.

== Personal life ==
Genest was born on June 30, 1986, in Shawinigan, Quebec.

Genest and partner Marie-Christine had a son on July 1, 2011, named Arno, just three weeks prior to Genest running a time that would qualify him for the 2011 World Championships in Athletics.

== Career ==
Alex started to run in 1997, at the age of 12, for Paul Lejeune High School. Genest says he "climbed step by step from regional competitions to provincial competitions." His taste for challenge and overcoming led him to international competition in 2003 when he represented Canada at the World Youth Championships in Athletics, held in nearby Sherbrooke, Quebec. He finished 6th at the event while teammate Chris Winter captured bronze.

Genest studied kinesiology at the Université de Sherbrooke until transferring to University of Guelph in order to bring his running to the next level by training at Speed River Track Club, known to be the best distance training centre in the country.

== Competition record ==
| Year | Competition | Venue | Position | Event | Notes |
Representing Canada
| 2004 | World Junior Championships | Grosseto, Italy | 15th (h) | 3000m steeplechase | 8:55.19 |
| 2005 | Pan American Junior Championships | Windsor, Canada | 2nd | 3000 m s'chase | 8:47.00 |
| 2005 | Jeux de la Francophonie | Niamey, Niger | – | 3000 m s'chase | DNF |
| 2008 | NACAC U-23 Championships | Toluca, Mexico | — | 3000m steeplechase | DNF |
| 2009 | Universiade | Belgrade, Serbia | 4th | 3000 m s'chase | 8:27.53 |
| 2009 | Jeux de la Francophonie | Beirut, Lebanon | 7th | 3000 m s'chase | 9:12.08 |
| 2011 | World Championships | Daegu, South Korea | 26th (h) | 3000 m s'chase | 8:36.67 |
| 2012 | Olympic Games | London, United Kingdom | 13th (h) | 3000 m s'chase | 8:22.62 |
| 2013 | World Championships | Moscow, Russia | 13th | 3000 m s'chase | 8:27.01 |
| 2015 | Pan American Games | Toronto, Canada | 2nd | 3000 m s'chase | 8:33.83 |
| 2015 | World Championships | Beijing, China | 29th (h) | 3000 m s'chase | 8:52.49 |

== Career highlights ==
- 1st, 2012 National Championships, Calgary, Alberta, Canada (Olympic "A" Standard).
- 3rd, 2013 National Championships, Moncton, New Brunswick, Canada (IAAF World Championships "A" Standard).
- Personal Best: 3000 metres steeplechase: 8:19.33, Barcelona, 22/07/2011
