= Donald Cowart =

American steeplechase runner

Personal information
- Born: 24 October 1985 (age 39) Rustburg, Virginia, United States

Sport
- Sport: Track and field
- Event: Steeplechase

Donald "Donnie" Cowart (born 24 October 1985) is an American steeplechase runner.

At the 2011 Pan American Games and the 2015 Pan American Games he placed fourth.
