= 2004 World Junior Championships in Athletics – Men's 3000 metres steeplechase =

The men's 3000 metres steeplechase event at the 2004 World Junior Championships in Athletics was held in Grosseto, Italy, at Stadio Olimpico Carlo Zecchini on 14 and 17 July.

== Medalists ==
Gold	Ronald Rutto; Kenya
Silver	Musa Amer Obaid; Qatar
Bronze	Moustafa Ahmed Shebto; Qatar

== Results ==
=== Final ===
17 July

Rank	Name	Nationality	Time	Notes
1st place, gold medalist(s)	Ronald Rutto	Kenya	8:23.32	
2nd place, silver medalist(s)	Musa Amer Obaid	Qatar	8:23.38	
3rd place, bronze medalist(s)	Moustafa Ahmed Shebto	Qatar	8:26.04	
4	Nathan Kibet Naibei	Kenya	8:30.77	
5	Barnabas Kimwogo	Uganda	8:37.23	
6	Ezkyas Sisay	Ethiopia	8:40.10	
7	Saïd Tbibi	Morocco	8:51.47	
8	Balázs Ott	Hungary	8:52.49	
9	Marcin Chabowski	Poland	8:53.10	
10	Hubert Pokrop	Poland	8:54.27	
11	Dieudonné Gahungu	Burundi	8:56.88	
12	Zolile Bhitane	South Africa	9:06.45	

=== Heats ===
14 July

==== Heat 1 ====
Rank	Name	Nationality	Time	Notes
1	Moustafa Ahmed Shebto	Qatar	8:47.70	Q
2	Nathan Kibet Naibei	Kenya	8:47.98	Q
3	Balázs Ott	Hungary	8:52.36	Q
4	Zolile Bhitane	South Africa	8:52.79	q
5	Timothée Bommier	France	8:57.90	
6	Valērijs Žolnerovičs	Latvia	8:59.58	
7	Rabia Makhloufi	Algeria	9:07.44	
8	Mark Buckingham	United Kingdom	9:09.43	
9	Derek Scott	United States	9:22.34	
	Ivan Jankovic	Serbia and Montenegro	DNF	
	Said El-Medouly	Morocco	DNF	

==== Heat 2 ====
Rank	Name	Nationality	Time	Notes
1	Musa Amer Obaid	Qatar	8:52.90	Q
2	Marcin Chabowski	Poland	8:53.10	Q
3	Barnabas Kimwogo	Uganda	8:53.22	Q
4	Mandla Maseko	South Africa	8:53.76	
5	Kyle Alcorn	United States	8:55.02	
6	Chris Winter	Canada	9:00.58	
7	Idris Yousef	Sudan	9:04.16	
8	Petr Ivanenko	Russia	9:04.50	
9	Jayden Russ	Australia	9:06.06	
10	Mahiedine Mekhissi-Benabbad	France	9:09.53	
11	Devis Licciardi	Italy	9:33.01	

==== Heat 3 ====
Rank	Name	Nationality	Time	Notes
1	Ronald Rutto	Kenya	8:35.51	Q
2	Ezkyas Sisay	Ethiopia	8:39.12	Q
3	Saïd Tbibi	Morocco	8:49.08	Q
4	Dieudonné Gahungu	Burundi	8:50.19	q
5	Hubert Pokrop	Poland	8:53.69	q
6	Alex Genest	Canada	8:55.19	
7	Albert Minczér	Hungary	9:00.59	
8	Luke Gunn	United Kingdom	9:01.20	
9	Cene Šubic	Slovenia	9:06.72	
10	Brahim Labsari	Algeria	9:07.81	
11	Stefan Patru	Romania	9:08.64	

== Participation ==
According to an unofficial count, 33 athletes from 22 countries participated in the event.

- Algeria (2)
- Australia (1)
- Burundi (1)
- Canada (2)
- Ethiopia (1)
- France (2)
- Hungary (2)
- Italy (1)
- Kenya (2)
- Latvia (1)
- Morocco (2)
- Poland (2)
- Qatar (2)
- Romania (1)
- Russia (1)
- Serbia and Montenegro (1)
- Slovenia (1)
- South Africa (2)
- Sudan (1)
- Uganda (1)
- United Kingdom (2)
- United States (2)
