= Athletics at the 2015 Pan American Games – Men's 3000 metres steeplechase =

Men's 3000 metres steeplechase at the 2015 Pan American Games
- Venue: CIBC Pan Am and Parapan Am Athletics Stadium
- Dates: July 21
- Competitors: 13 from 9 nations
- Winning time: 8:32.18

Medalists
Gold medal	Matt Hughes	Canada
Silver medal	Alex Genest	Canada
Bronze medal	Cory Leslie	United States

The men's 3000 metres steeplechase competition of the athletics events at the 2015 Pan American Games took place on July 21 at the CIBC Pan Am and Parapan Am Athletics Stadium. The event was won by Matt Hughes of Canada in a time of 8:32.18.

== Records ==
Prior to this competition, the existing world and Pan American Games records were as follows:

World record	Saif Saaeed Shaheen (QAT)	7:53.63	Brussels, Belgium	September 3, 2004
Pan American Games record	Wander do Prado Moura (BRA)	8:14.41	Mar del Plata, Argentina	March 22, 1995

== Qualification ==
Each National Olympic Committee (NOC) was able to enter up to two entrants providing they had met the minimum standard (9.00.00) in the qualifying period (January 1, 2014 to June 28, 2015).

== Schedule ==
Date	Time	Round
July 21, 2015	19:10	Final

== Results ==
All times shown are in seconds.

KEY:	q	Fastest non-qualifiers	Q	Qualified	NR	National record	PB	Personal best	SB	Seasonal best	DQ	Disqualified

=== Final ===
Rank	Name	Nationality	Time	Notes
1st place, gold medalist(s)	Matt Hughes	Canada	8:32.18	
2nd place, silver medalist(s)	Alex Genest	Canada	8:33.83	
3rd place, bronze medalist(s)	Cory Leslie	United States	8:36.83	
4	Donald Cowart	United States	8:49.00	
5	Mauricio Valdivia	Chile	8:52.72	
6	Luis Enrique Ibarra	Mexico	8:57.70	
7	Jose Peña	Venezuela	8:59.40	
8	Jean Carlos Machado	Brazil	9:04.21	
9	Enzo Yañez	Chile	9:07.75	
10	Alvaro Abreu	Dominican Republic	9:10.47	
11	Erick Rodríguez	Nicaragua	9:25.90	
	Gerard Giraldo	Colombia	DNF	
	Marvin Blanco	Venezuela	DQ	
