= Nikolay Chavkin =

Russian runner

Nikolay Anatolyevich Chavkin (Cyrillic: Николай Анатольевич Чавкин; born 24 April 1984 in Moscow) is a Russian runner specialising in the 3000 metres steeplechase. He competed in that event at the 2012 Summer Olympics, failing to qualify for the final and was later disqualified following a doping ban.

On 28 March 2024, Chavkin received a 30 month competition ban for breaking anti-doping regulations for the use of prohibited substance. All his results from 4 July 2012 to 3 January 20215 were disqualified.

== Competition record ==
Year	Competition	Venue	Position	Event	Notes
Representing Russia
2011	Universiade	Shenzhen, China	4th	3000 m steeplechase	8:35.10
2012	Olympic Games	London, United Kingdom	~~DQ~~	3000 m steeplechase	~~8:29.72~~
2014	European Championships	Zürich, Switzerland	~~DQ~~	3000 m steeplechase	~~8:45.70~~
2015	World Championships	Beijing, China	27th (h)	3000 m steeplechase	8:51.22
