= Patrick Nasti =

Italian athlete

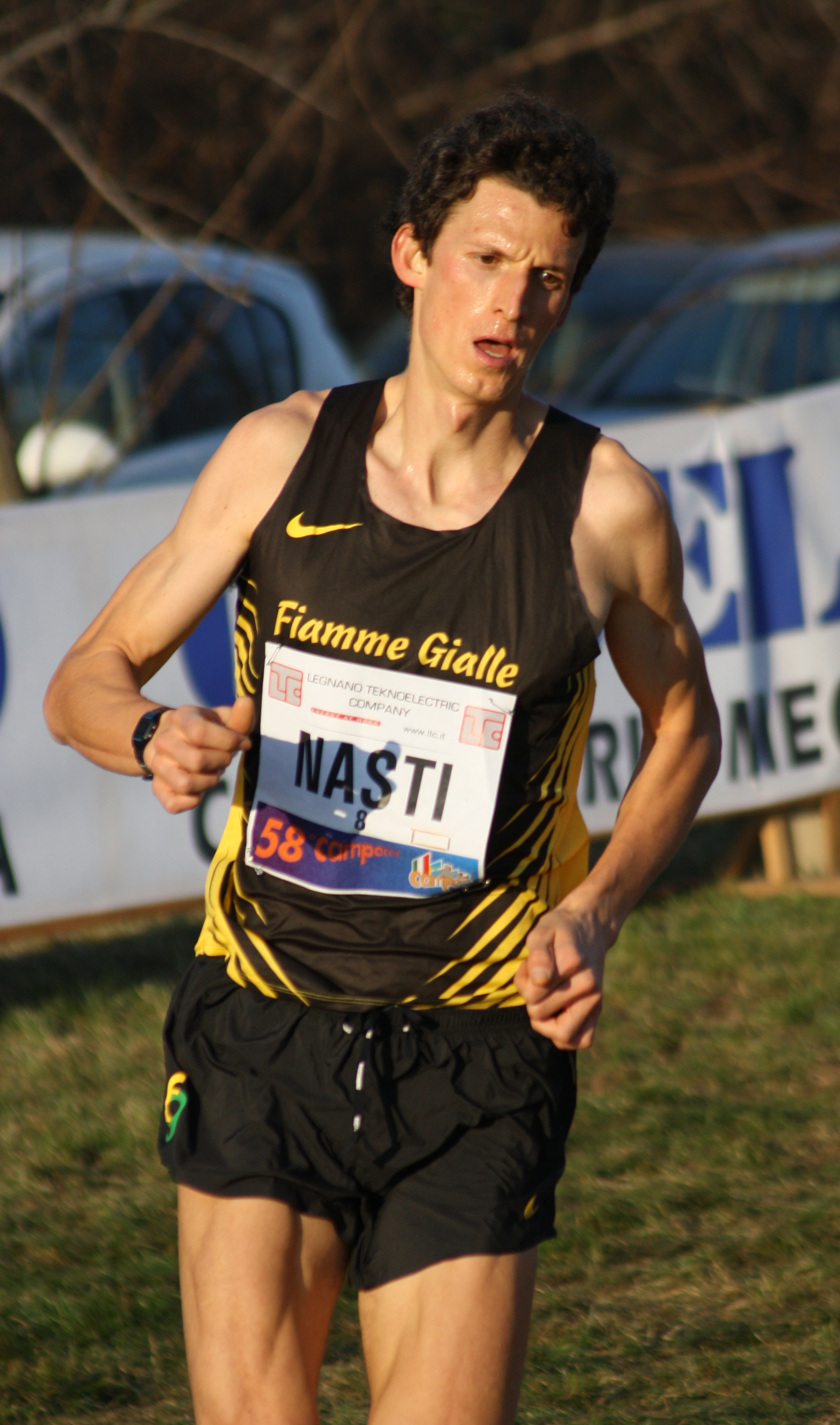
- Patrick Nasti in 2015

Personal information
- Nationality: Italian
- Born: 30 August 1989 (age 36) Trieste

Sport
- Country: Italy
- Sport: Athletics
- Event(s): Long-distance running 3000 m steeplechase

Achievements and titles
- Personal best: 3000 m st: 8:28.12 (2014)
Medal record
Universiade
Bronze medal – third place	2013 Kazan	3000 m s'chase
European Cross Country Championships
Bronze medal – third place	2014 Samokov	Team

Patrick Nasti (born 30 August 1989) is an Italian athlete competing primarily in the 3000 metres steeplechase.

== Biography ==
He represented his country at the 2013 World Championships without qualifying for the final. In addition, he won the bronze at the 2013 Summer Universiade. His personal best in the event is 8:28.12, set in Huelva in 2014.

== Personal bests ==
Outdoor

- 1000 metres – 2:33.54 (Trieste 2014)
- 1500 metres – 3:47.85 (Marcon 2012)
- 3000 metres – 8:06.11 (Velletri 2010)
- 5000 metres – 13:44.49 (Rovereto 2012)
- 10,000 metres – 33:27.39 (2007)
- Half marathon – 1:06:17 (Aurisina 2013)
- 3000 metres steeplechase – 8:28.12 (Huelva 2014)

Indoor

- 3000 metres – 8:14.63 (Ancona 2011)

== Achievements ==
Year	Competition	Venue	Position	Event	Notes
Representing Italy
2011	European U23 Championships	Ostrava, Czech Republic	5th	3000 m s'chase	8:42.37
2011	Universiade	Shenzhen, China	6th	3000 m s'chase	8:45.06
2012	European Championships	Helsinki, Finland	12th	3000 m s'chase	8:48.37
2013	Mediterranean Games	Mersin, Turkey	6th	3000 m s'chase	8:32.46
2013	Universiade	Kazan, Russia	3rd	3000 m s'chase	8:38.41
2013	World Championships	Moscow, Russia	33rd (h)	3000 m s'chase	8:36.42
2014	European Championships	Zürich, Switzerland	23rd (h)	3000 m s'chase	8:46.80
2015	Universiade	Gwangju, South Korea	6th	3000 m s'chase	8:42.04
