= Futsal at the 2009 Lusofonia Games =

Futsal tournament in 2009

The Futsal tournament of the 2009 Lusophony Games was played in Lisbon, Portugal. The venue was the Pavilhão Atlântico. The tournament was played from 12 to 17 July 2009, and there was just the men's competition.

== Futsal medal table by country ==
| Pos | Country: | Gold | Silver | Bronze | Total: |
|---|---|---|---|---|---|
| 1 | Brazil | 1 | - | - | 1 |
| 2 | Portugal | - | 1 | - | 1 |
| 3 | Angola | - | - | 1 | 1 |
| | | | | | 3 |

== Male Competition ==
=== Round Robin ===
| Rank | Team | Pts | Pld | W | D | L | GF | GA | GD |
|---|---|---|---|---|---|---|---|---|---|
| 1 | Brazil | 12 | 4 | 4 | 0 | 0 | 32 | 2 | 31 |
| 2 | Portugal | 9 | 4 | 3 | 0 | 1 | 20 | 3 | 17 |
| 3 | Angola | 6 | 4 | 2 | 0 | 2 | 14 | 11 | 3 |
| 4 | Guinea-Bissau | 3 | 4 | 1 | 0 | 3 | 7 | 26 | -19 |
| 5 | São Tomé and Príncipe | 0 | 4 | 0 | 0 | 4 | 5 | 37 | -32 |

| Portugal | 14 - 1 | São Tomé and Príncipe |
| Brazil | 15 - 0 | Guinea-Bissau |
| Portugal | 3 - 0 | Guinea-Bissau |
| Angola | 8 - 0 | São Tomé and Príncipe |
| Portugal | 3 - 0 | Angola |
| São Tomé and Príncipe | 2 - 9 | Brazil |
| Brazil | 7 - 0 | Angola |
| São Tomé and Príncipe | 2 - 6 | Guinea-Bissau |
| Guinea-Bissau | 1 - 6 | Angola |
| Portugal | 0 - 2 | Brazil |

== See also ==
- ACOLOP
- Lusophony Games
- 2009 Lusophony Games
