= Víctor García (runner) =

Spanish steeplechase runner

Personal information
- Born: 13 March 1985 (age 40)

Sport
- Country: Spain
- Sport: Track and field

Víctor García Blázquez (born 13 March 1985) is a Spanish athlete competing in 3000 metres steeplechase. His personal best at the 3000 metres steeplechase is 8:15.20.

Garcia got bronze medal at the 2012 European Championships in Helsinki at the 3000 metres steeplechase event.

== Competition record ==
Year	Competition	Venue	Position	Event	Notes
Representing Spain
2007	European U23 Championships	Debrecen, Hungary	4th	3000 m s'chase	8:36.62
2007	Universiade	Bangkok, Thailand	12th	3000 m s'chase	8:50.31
2011	European Indoor Championships	Paris, France	20th (h)	3000 m	8:11.31
2011	World Championships	Daegu, South Korea	17th (h)	3000 m s'chase	8:28.97
2012	World Indoor Championships	Istanbul, Turkey	17th (h)	3000 m	7:59.85
2012	European Championships	Helsinki, Finland	3rd	3000 m s'chase	8:35.87
2014	European Championships	Zürich, Switzerland	–	3000 m s'chase	DNF
2016	World Indoor Championships	Portland, United States	17th (h)	3000 m	8:25.62
