= Disabled athletics at the Lusofonia Games =

The disabled athletics tournament is held since 2009. In the 2009 Games it comprised a demonstration event, the 1500 meters in wheelchair for men, so its champion would not count in the final medal ranking of those Games.

== Men's events winners ==
=== 400 m ===
- 2009: Angola Cândido Cândido

=== 1500 m wheelchair (Demonstration event) ===
- 2009: Cape Verde Francisco Pina

== Women's events winners ==
=== 400 m ===
- 2009: Angola Maria Celeste Manuel
