= Taekwondo at the 2009 Lusofonia Games =

Taekwondo competition

The Taekwondo at the 2009 Lusophony Games was held in the Pavilhão Atlântico on July.

== Medal table by country ==
Pos	Country	Gold	Silver	Bronze	Total
1	Brazil	3	2	1	6
2	Portugal	2	2	3	7
3	India	1	1	4	6
4	São Tomé and Príncipe	1	1	3	5
5	Macau	1	-	2	3
6	Mozambique	-	2	-	2
7	Angola	-	-	2	2
8	Sri Lanka	-	-	1	1

== Results ==
=== Men's Results ===
Event	Gold	Silver	Bronze
-58 kg	(Portugal) Pedro Póvoa	(Mozambique) Nicolau Sambo	(Macau) Chi Kin Cheong (São Tomé and Príncipe) Lainel Fernandes
-68 kg	(India) Chandan Lakra	(Portugal) José Pedro Fernandes	(Angola) Makila Mawungo (São Tomé and Príncipe) José Miranda
-80 kg	(São Tomé and Príncipe) Eloy Boa Morte	(Brazil) Henrique Moura	(India) Rajan Pandia (Portugal) Jean Michel Fernandes
+80 kg	(Brazil) José Kuntgner	(Mozambique) Zhi Quan Chen	(Sri Lanka) Gayan Galuge (Portugal) Carlos Adão

=== Women's Results ===
Event	Gold	Silver	Bronze
-49 kg	(Brazil) Fernanda Silva	(India) Kavita Jangam	(Macau) Justina Lei (Portugal) Márcia Silva
-57 kg	(Portugal) Ana Rita Lopes	(Brazil) Natália Pires	(India) Sherol Fernandes (São Tomé and Príncipe) Jenice Pontes
-67 kg	(Brazil) Raphaella Pereira	(São Tomé and Príncipe) Nilza Alegra	(Angola) Sandra António (India) Rashmi Naik
+67 kg	(Macau) Junnan Wang	(Portugal) Ana Patricia Santos	(India) Reema Aranha (Brazil) Hellorayne Paiva

== See also ==
- ACOLOP
