= Judo at the Lusofonia Games =

Judo competition

Competition details
- Discipline: Judo
- Type: Quadrennial
- Organiser: ACOLOP

History
- First edition: Lisbon 2009
- Editions: 2
- Most recent: Goa 2014

The Judo tournament at the Lusofonia Games was first held at the 2009 edition of the Lusofonia Games.

== Winners ==
=== Men's tournament ===
Year	–60 kg	–66 kg	–73 kg	–81 kg	–90 kg	–100 kg	+100 kg	Ref.
2009	Felipe Kitadai (BRA)	Tiago Lopes (POR)	Rodrigo Rocha (BRA)	Nacif Elias Junior (BRA)	Filipe Oliveira (BRA)	Carlos Honorato (BRA)	Rafael Silva (BRA)	
2014								

=== Women's tournament ===
Year	–48 kg	–52 kg	–57 kg	–63 kg	–70 kg	–78 kg	+78 kg	Ref.
2009	Daniela Polzin (BRA)	Raquel Silva (BRA)	Mariana Barros (BRA)	Mariana Silva (BRA)	Antónia Moreira (ANG)	Yahima Ramirez (POR)	Priscila Silva (BRA)	
2014								
