= Athletics at the Lusofonia Games =

Athletics is one of the sports at the quadrennial Lusophone Games (Portuguese: Jogos da Lusofonia) competition. It featured at the inaugural edition in 2006, and also the second edition of the Games in 2009.

In the 2009 Games, the half Marathon event was replaced by the 10,000 metres road race.

== Editions ==
Games	Year	Host city	Host country
I	2006	Macau	Macau
II	2009	Lisbon	Portugal
III	2014	Goa	India
IV	2017 cancelled	Maputo	Mozambique

== Men's champions ==
=== 100 m ===
- 2009: Portugal Francis Obikwelu
- 2006: Brazil Jorge Sena

=== 200 m ===
- 2009: Portugal Arnaldo Abrantes
- 2006: Brazil Bruno Barros Jr.

=== 400 m ===
- 2009: Brazil Eduardo Vasconcelos
- 2006: Brazil Fernando Almeida

=== 800 m ===
- 2009: Brazil Lutimar Paes
- 2006: Brazil Kleberson Davide

=== 1500 m ===
- 2009: Sri Lanka Chaminda Wijekoon
- 2006: Sri Lanka Chaminda Wijekoon

=== 5000 m ===
- 2009: Portugal Manuel Damião
- 2006: Brazil Sergio Silva

=== 10,000 m road ===
- 2009: Portugal Rui Pedro Silva

=== Half-Marathon ===
- 2006: Cape Verde Nelson Cruz

=== 110 m H ===
- 2009: Brazil Anselmo Silva
- 2006: Brazil Rodrigo Pereira

=== 400 m H ===
- 2009: Brazil Raphael Fernandes
- 2006: Mozambique Leonel Kurt

=== 3000 m St. ===
- 2009: Portugal Alberto Paulo
- 2006: Portugal Pedro Ribeiro

=== High jump ===
- 2009: Brazil Guilherme Cobbo
- 2006: Brazil Fábio Baptista

=== Long jump ===
- 2009: Portugal Marcos Chuva
- 2006: Brazil Rogerio Bispo

=== Triple jump ===
- 2009: Portugal Nelson Évora
- 2006: Portugal Nelson Évora

=== Shot put ===
- 2009: Portugal Marco Fortes
- 2006: Portugal Marco Fortes

=== 4 x 100m ===
- 2009: Brazil
- 2006: Brazil

=== 4 x 400 m ===
- 2009: Brazil
- 2006: Brazil

== Women's champions ==
=== 100 m ===
- 2009: Brazil Lucimar Moura
- 2006: Sri Lanka Susanthika Mannalage

=== 200 m ===
- 2009: Portugal Sónia Tavares
- 2006: Sri Lanka Susanthika Mannalage

=== 400 m ===
- 2009: Brazil Jailma Lima
- 2006: Brazil Cristina Elaine

=== 800 m ===
- 2009: Portugal Sandra Teixeira
- 2006: Mozambique Leonor Piuza

=== 1500 m ===
- 2009: Portugal Jessica Augusto
- 2006: Portugal Sandra Teixeira

=== 5000 m ===
- 2009: Portugal Sara Moreira
- 2006: Brazil Sabine Heitling

=== 10,000 m road ===
- 2009: Portugal Fernanda Ribeiro

=== Half-Marathon ===
- 2006: Portugal Mónica Silva

=== 100 m H ===
- 2009: Brazil Fabiana Moraes
- 2006: Brazil Lucimara Silva

=== 400 m H ===
- 2009: Brazil Lucimar Teodoro
- 2006: Brazil Amanda Dias

=== High jump ===
- 2009: Brazil Lucimana Silva
- 2006: Portugal Marisa Anselmo

=== Long jump ===
- 2009: Portugal Naide Gomes
- 2006: Brazil Tânia Silva

=== Triple jump ===
- 2009: Portugal Patricia Mamona
- 2006: Brazil Tânia Silva

=== Shot put ===
- 2009: Brazil Elisangela Adriano
- 2006: Brazil Kelly Medeiros

=== 4 x 100 m ===
- 2009: Brazil
- 2006: Brazil

=== 4 x 400 m ===
- 2009: Brazil
- 2006: Brazil

== See also ==
- List of Lusophone Games records in athletics
