= Judo at the 2009 Lusofonia Games =

Judo competition

Judo Judo at the 2009 Lusofonia Games
- Venue: MEO Arena
- Location: Lisbon, Portugal
- Date: 14–15 July 2009

Competition at external databases
- Links: JudoInside

The Judo at the 2009 Lusofonia Games event was held at the Pavilhão Atlântico in Lisbon, Portugal from 14 to 15 July 2009.

== Medal table by country ==
Pos	Country	Gold	Silver	Bronze	Total
1	Brazil	11	2	1	14
2	Portugal	2	9	2	13
3	Angola	1	1	3	5
4	Macau		1	3	4
5	Mozambique		1	1	2
6	Cape Verde			2	2

== Results ==
=== Men's Results ===
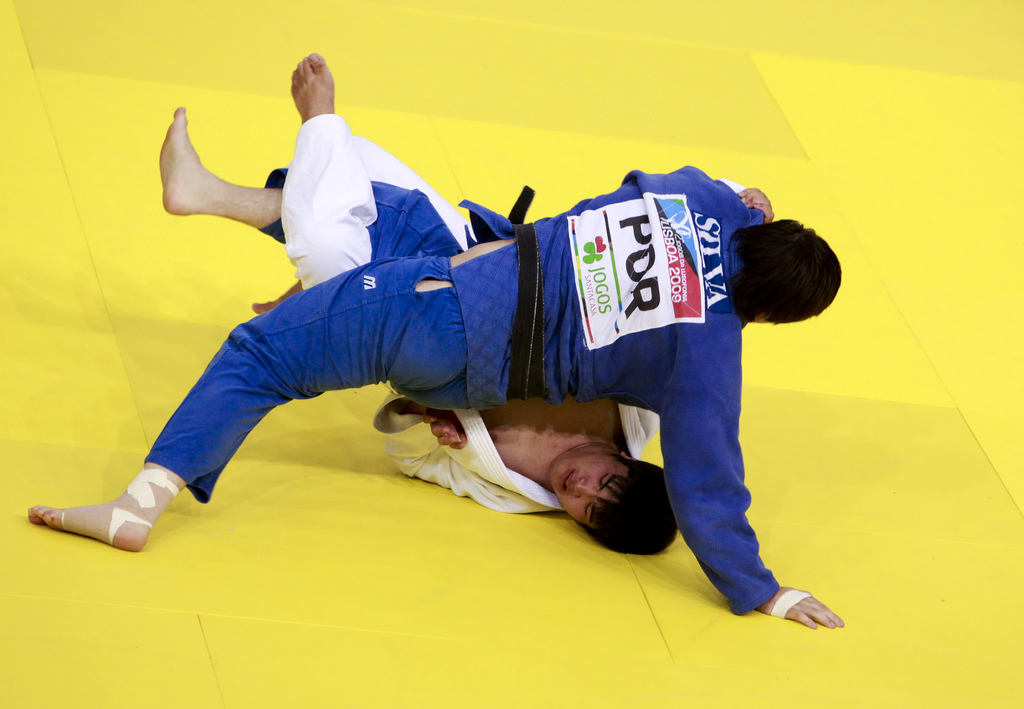
Third place playoff in the -100 kg category.

Event	Gold	Silver	Bronze
-60 kg	(Brazil) Felipe Kitadai	(Macau) Kin Wai Wong	--
-66 kg	(Portugal) Tiago Lopes	(Mozambique) Bruno Luzia	(Angola) Laurindo Fonseca (Brazil) Luiz Revite
-73 kg	(Brazil) Rodrigo Rocha	(Portugal) Diogo Couto	(Angola) Ângelo António
-81 kg	(Brazil) Nacif Elias Junior	(Portugal) Miguel Medeiros	(Mozambique) Micael Fumo (Cape Verde) Eric Lima
-90 kg	(Brazil) Filipe Oliveira	(Portugal) Hugo Silva	(Cape Verde) Elio Santos
-100 kg	(Brazil) Carlos Honorato	(Angola) Casemiro Bento	(Portugal) Antonio Silva
+100 kg	(Brazil) Rafael Silva	(Portugal) João Taveira	(Angola) Denis Oliveira

=== Women's Results ===
Event	Gold	Silver	Bronze
-48 kg	(Brazil) Daniela Polzin	(Portugal) Leandra Freitas	(Macau) Siu Pon Leong
-52 kg	(Brazil) Raquel Silva	(Portugal) Marta Santos	(Macau) Chi Ieng Vong
-57 kg	(Brazil) Mariana Barros	(Portugal) Joana Cesario	(Macau) Ka Mei Cheang
-63 kg	(Brazil) Mariana Silva	(Portugal) Andreia Cavalleri	--
-70 kg	(Angola) Antonia Moreira	(Brazil) Natália Bordignon	(Portugal) Verónica Raposo
-78 kg	(Portugal) Yahima Ramirez	(Brazil) Claudirene César	--
+78 kg	(Brazil) Priscila Silva	(Portugal) Joana Costa	--
