= Joshua McAdams =

American track and field athlete (born 1980)

Personal information
- Nationality: United States
- Born: March 26, 1980 (age 46) Atlanta
- Height: 175 cm (5 ft 9 in)
- Weight: 72.7 kg (160 lb)

Sport
- Sport: Running
- Event: 3,000m Steeplechase
- College team: Brigham Young University '06
- Club: New Balance
Medal record
Men's Athletics
Representing the United States
Pan American Games
Gold medal – first place	2007 Rio de Janeiro	3000 m st.
USA Outdoor Championships
Gold medal – first place	2009	3000 m st.
Bronze medal – third place	2008	3000 m st.
Gold medal – first place	2007	3000 m st.

Joshua McAdams (born March 26, 1980) is an American track and field athlete who competes in the 3,000 meter steeplechase.

== Education ==
McAdams attended Brecksville-Broadview Heights High School, where he was a four-time OHSAA state placer in track and cross country and a three time OHSAA state placer in wrestling. He initially competed for Belmont University, where he described his performance as not "spectacular". He then left the school to complete a two-year mission for the Church of Jesus Christ of Latter-day Saints in Thailand. On returning to school, McAdams switched to Brigham Young University where he studied microbiology and molecular biology and was a non-scholarship athlete on the track team. He won the 3000 meter Steeplechase at the 2006 NCAA National Championships. In 2012, McAdams graduated from the Southern College of Optometry and completed a rotation in neuro-optometry and ocular disease at the Miles Eye Center in Show Low, Arizona.

== Professional career ==
In June 2009 McAdams won the USA Outdoor Steeplechase to become National champion for a second time. McAdams represented USA in the World championships in Berlin, Germany in August 2009.

McAdams is also a 2007 USA Outdoor champion; 2007 Pan American Games champ; and 2006 NCAA Outdoor champion. He has placed 8th at 2005 USA Outdoors and 9th at 2005 NCAA Outdoors.

After a successful 2007, McAdams finished third in the 2008 Olympic Trials for 3,000 meter steeplechase. Following the win at the 2007 AT&T USA Outdoor Championships, he won the gold medal at the 2007 Pan American Games in Rio de Janeiro, Brazil, in 8 minutes 30.49 seconds. Also that year, he improved his personal best time to 8:21.36, ending the 2007 campaign ranked #1 in the U.S. by Track & Field News.

McAdams won the 2006 NCAA Outdoor Championships 3,000m steeplechase title with his then personal best time of 8:34.10. With this victory, he was the first runner from BYU to win a distance National Champion since his coach, Ed Eyestone, who won the 5,000-meter title in 1985.

He qualified for the 2008 Summer Olympics after coming in 3rd at 2008 Olympic Trials.

== Accomplishments ==
- 2009: USA Outdoor champion (8:29.91)
- 2008: 9th in opening round at Olympic Games (8:33.26)…3rd at Olympic Trials (8:21.99)...ranked #3 in U.S. by T&FN...best of 8:21.99.
- 2007: USA Outdoor champion (8:24.46)…Pan American Games champ (8:30.49)… 5th in heats at World Outdoors (8:32.46)...2nd at Nike Prefontaine Classic (8:21.36PR)…2nd at Payton Jordan Cardinal Invitational (8:23.69)…ranked #1 in U.S. by T&FN…best of 8:21.36.
- 2006: NCAA champion (8:34.10)…10th at USA Outdoors (8:37.91)…best of 8:34.10.
- 2005: 8th at USA Outdoors (8:39.81)…9th at NCAA Outdoors (8:36.88)…best of 8:34.84.
- 2004: Best of 8:45.26.

== Personal life ==
McAdams is a member of the Church of Jesus Christ of Latter-day Saints. He served a two-year church mission in Bangkok, Thailand. He currently lives in Meridian, Idaho.
