= 2009 Lusofonia Games =

II Lusofonia Games
- Host city: Lisbon, Portugal
- Motto: A união é mais importante que a vitória "Union is more important than victory"
- Nations: 12
- Athletes: 1,300
- Events: 67 (10 sports) plus one demonstration event
- Opening: 11 July 2009
- Closing: 19 July 2009
- Opened by: Aníbal Cavaco Silva
- Closed by: José Sócrates
- Main venue: MEO Arena (ceremonies); Estádio Universitário (athletics)
- Website: lisboa2009.org

The 2009 Lusofonia Games (Portuguese: 2.^{os} Jogos da Lusofonia) was the second Lusofonia Games, a multi-sport event for delegations representing Portuguese-speaking National Olympic committees. It took place in Lisbon, Portugal, from 11 to 19 July 2009. The Pavilhão Atlântico acted as the main venue, staging the opening ceremonies and the majority of the sporting events.

== Host decision ==
The organization was awarded to Portugal during the 6th ACOLOP general assembly, gathered in Macau, on 10 October 2006. José Vicente de Moura, president of the Olympic Committee of Portugal and honorary president of the ACOLOP, is also the president of the Organizing Committee for the 2009 Lusophony Games (COJOL).

== Participants ==
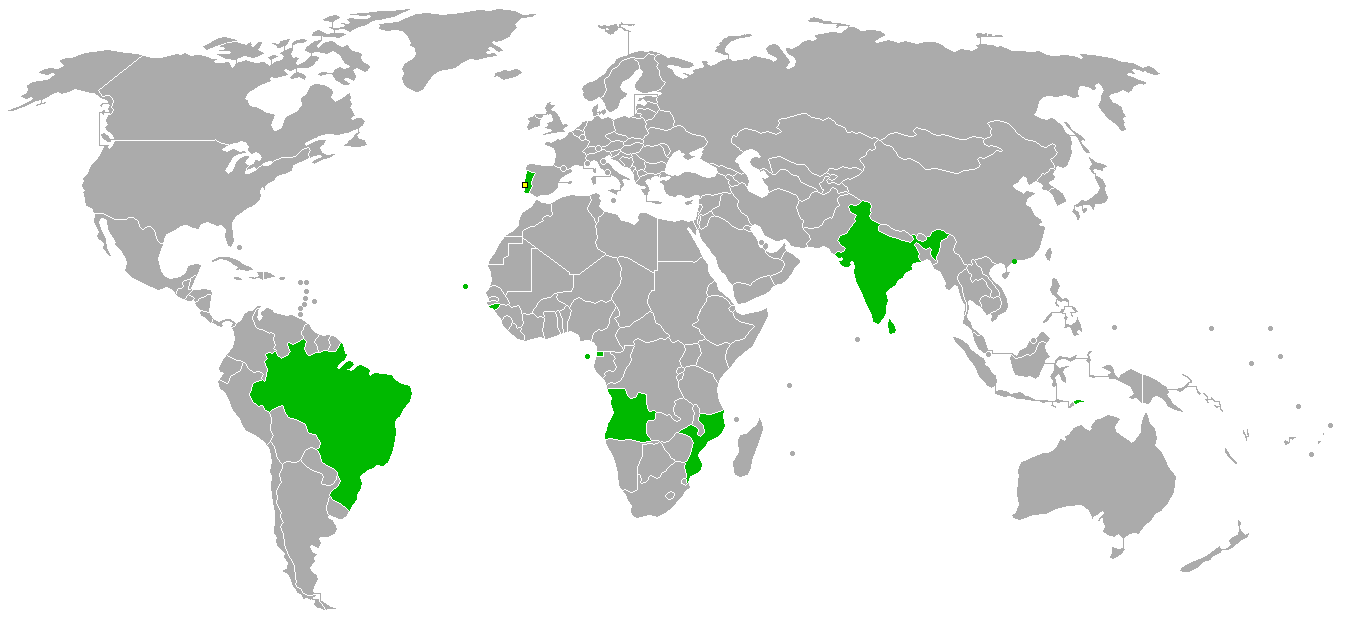
Countries participating in the 2009 Lusophony Games

- Portugal (170 athletes)
- Macau
- Brazil
- Cape Verde
- Mozambique
- Angola
- Equatorial Guinea
- India
- Sri Lanka (20 athletes)
- Guinea-Bissau
- East Timor
- São Tomé and Príncipe

== Games ==
=== Sports ===
On 21 May 2007, during a meeting between the 2009 Games Organizing Committee (Portuguese: Comité Organizador dos Jogos da Lusofonia 2009, COJOL) and the ACOLOP (Associação dos Comités de Língua Oficial Portuguesa, English: Association of the Portuguese-Speaking Committees), a decision on which should be the ninth sport to be included in the competition program—out of a list that included badminton, canoeing, judo, swimming, and roller hockey — was delayed due to insufficient survey data from some of the ACOLOP member committees. Later that year, on 12 November the ACOLOP general assembly, gathered in Lisbon, finally decided to add judo to the official program.

This edition thus featured nine sports—one more than in the inaugural games in 2006 — comprising 65 events. Three events for disabled athletes were included in the athletics competition, for a total of 68. One of those disabled athletics events is of demonstration nature and is not included in the medal ranking.

- Athletics
  - Disabled athletics
- Basketball
- Beach volleyball
- Football (men)
- Futsal (men)
- Judo
- Table Tennis
- Taekwondo
- Volleyball

=== Venues ===
Most of the competitions were held in venues within Lisbon, but other sports, like beach and indoor volleyball, were played in the neighbouring municipalities of Oeiras and Almada, respectively. The opening and closing ceremonies were held at Pavilhão Atlântico, the largest venue, where four sports took place as well.

Venue	Location	Sport	Capacity
Estádio Universitário	Lisbon	Athletics, Disabled athletics	3,670
Pavilhão Açoreana Seguros	Lisbon	Basketball	2,400
Pavilhão Atlântico	Lisbon	Judo, Futsal, Taekwondo, Table tennis	20,000
Pavilhão Municipal de Almada	Almada	Volleyball	N/A
Santo Amaro de Oeiras Beach	Oeiras	Beach volleyball and closing ceremonies	N/A
Estádio Nacional	Oeiras	Football	38,000
Estádio José Gomes	Amadora	Football	10,000

=== Calendar ===
In this table, each blue box represents an event competition, such as a qualification round or group match. The golden boxes represent days during which medal-awarding finals for a sport were held. The number indicated in each box represents the number of finals that were to be contested on that day. The sports marked with an asterisk (*) means that it has an event that is a demonstration sport and its champion does not count in the final tally.

Opening ceremony	Event competitions	Event finals	Closing ceremony

July 2009	10th Sat	11th Sat	12th Sun	13th Mon	14th Tue	15th Wed	16th Thu	17th Fri	18th Sat	19th Sun	Gold medals
Athletics			13	16						2	31
Basketball										2	2
Beach volleyball										2	2
Disabled athletics*			2								2
Football									1		1
Futsal								1			1
Judo					6	8					14
Table tennis			2	2							5
Taekwondo							4	4			8
Volleyball			2								2
Total gold medals			19	18	6	8	4	5	1	6	
Cumulative Total			19	37	43	51	55	60	61	67	
Ceremonies											
July 2009	10th Sat	11th Sat	12th Sun	13th Mon	14th Tue	15th Wed	16th Thu	17th Fri	18th Sat	19th Sun	Gold medals

=== Symbols ===
The image and identity of the Lisbon 2009 Lusophony Games were conveyed by its official logo and mascot. The logo represents an "athlete, celebrating victory with a multicoloured ribbon, following the motto 'Union stronger than Victory', in an appeal to fair-play and unity between the athletes". The mascot, representing a youthful humanized flame, is called "Xama" (after "chama", "flame" in English) and embodies the spirit of sport, the athlete's desire to surpass own limits, the "energy and vivacity" that give "body and soul in every heat".

== Medal table ==
Note that when each champion is counted, the results will differ from the official results, therefore the following table will not match the official one as shown on the competition's website.

Host nation (Portugal)

2009 Lusophony Games medal count					
Pos	Country	Gold	Silver	Bronze	Total
1	Brazil	33	23	20	76
2	Portugal	25	34	15	74
3	Angola	4	1	9	14
4	Macau	1	3	8	12
5	Cape Verde	1	1	5	7
5	India	1	1	5	7
5	São Tomé and Príncipe	1	1	5	7
8	Sri Lanka	1	0	4	5
9	Mozambique	0	3	2	5
Total		67	67	73	207
