= Lusofonia Games =

International sporting event

- Status: Active
- Genre: Sports event
- Frequency: Quadrennially (planned)
- Location: Varies
- Inaugurated: 2006
- Most recent: 2014
- Organizer: ACOLOP

The Lusofonia Games (Portuguese: Jogos da Lusofonia) are a multinational multi-sport event organized by the ACOLOP, which involves athletes coming from Lusophone (Portuguese-speaking) countries. Most countries competing are members of the Community of Portuguese Language Countries (CPLP), some with significant Portuguese communities or history with Portugal. Participating countries are founding members Angola, Brazil, Cape Verde, East Timor, Guinea-Bissau, Macau (Chinese SAR), Mozambique, Portugal and São Tomé and Príncipe, and associate members India, Equatorial Guinea, and Sri Lanka. In addition, Ghana, Flores (an island of Indonesia), Mauritius and Morocco have also expressed the desire to participate in future events.

This event is similar in concept to the Commonwealth Games (for members of the Commonwealth of Nations) and the Jeux de la Francophonie (for the Francophone community).

== Editions ==
=== Summer ===
Year	Edition	Date	Host country	Host city	Champions	Athletes (nations)
2006	I	7–15 October	Macau	Macau	Brazil (57 medals)	733 (11)
2009	II	11–19 July	Portugal	Lisbon	Brazil (76 medals)	1300 (12)
2014	III	18–29 January	India	Goa	India (92 medals)	7000 (12)
2017	–	Cancelled	Mozambique	Maputo	–	Cancelled
2021	–	Cancelled	Angola	Luanda	–	Cancelled

=== Winter ===
Year	Edition	Date	Host country	Host city	Champions	Athletes (nations)
2028	I	TBA	Portugal	Loriga	TBA	TBA

The 2017 Games were awarded to Mozambique. However, as of November 2017, they had not taken place. A delegation from CPLP met with officials in São Tomé and Príncipe about holding the Games there in July 2018. There are official currently with plans for any 4th edition for the hosted Fortaleza e Eusébio.

=== Inaugural edition ===
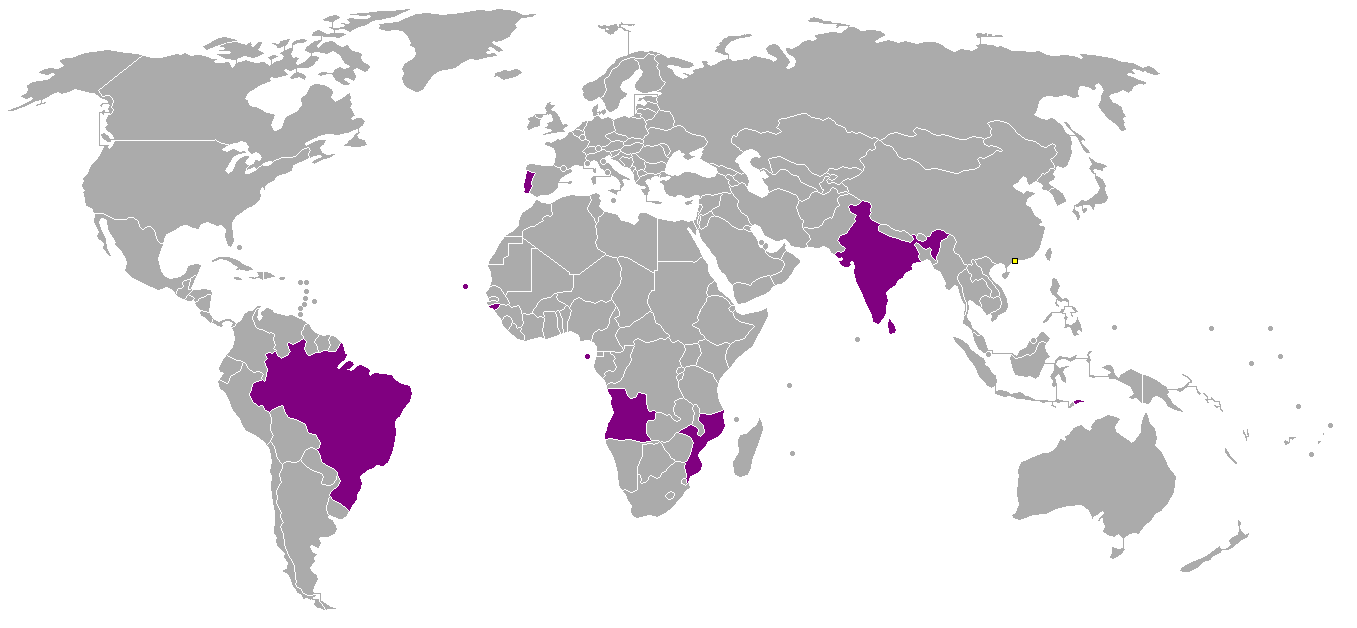
Participating countries (purple) and host city (yellow square) of the 1st Lusofonia Games.

The 1st Lusofonia Games were hosted by Macau, from 7 to 15 October 2006, comprising 733 athletes from 11 countries (Equatorial Guinea did not field any athletes), some of which are international sports stars.

In competition were a total of 48 events distributed between 8 sports: athletics, basketball, beach volleyball, football, futsal, table tennis, taekwondo, volleyball. Portugal and Brazil were the top medal collectors of the Games, managing to grab 85% of the titles. These two countries acquired 71% of the total medals of the Games. All delegations won medals.

== List of countries/territories ==
=== Countries that have participated ===
- Angola
- Brazil
- Cape Verde
- East Timor
- Equatorial Guinea
- Guinea-Bissau
- India
- Macau
- Mozambique
- Portugal
- São Tomé and Príncipe
- Sri Lanka

== All-time medal table ==
Lusofonia Games medal count
Pos	Country	Gold	Silver	Bronze	Total
1	Brazil	64	43	32	139
2	Portugal	55	72	48	175
3	India	38	29	35	102
4	Macau	16	15	33	64
5	Sri Lanka	10	13	18	41
6	Angola	9	12	25	46
7	Mozambique	8	7	10	25
8	Cape Verde	3	8	16	27
9	Guinea-Bissau	2	1	1	4
10	São Tomé and Príncipe	1	3	7	11
11	(Timor-Leste) East Timor	0	0	2	2
12	Equatorial Guinea	0	0	0	0
Total		206	203	227	636

== Sports ==
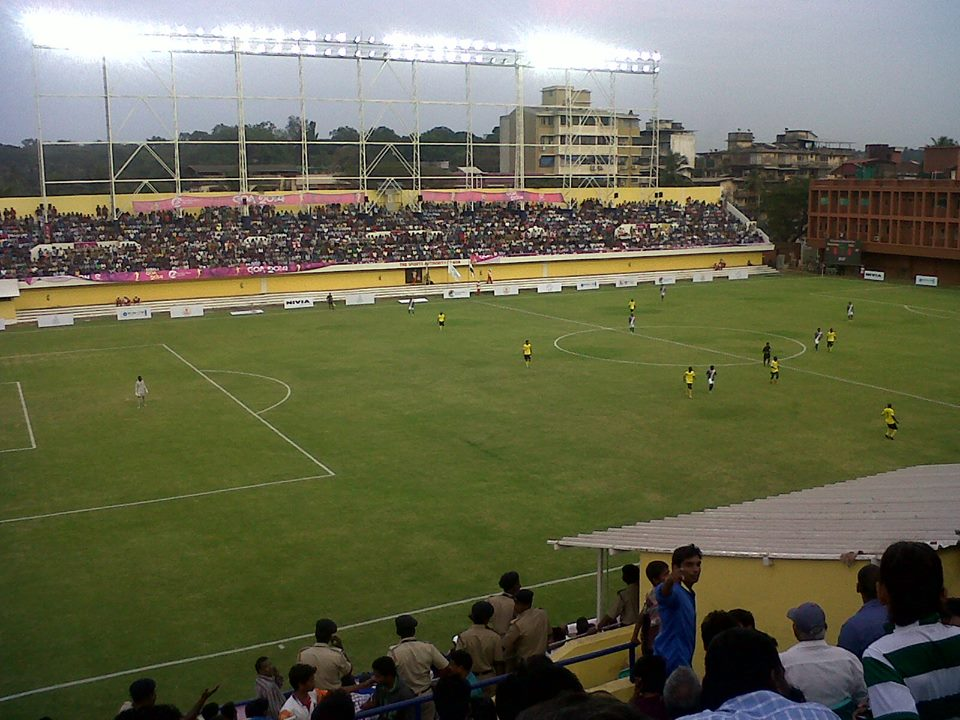
Football match: India vs Mozambique, during the 2014 Lusophony Games at Tilak Maidan Stadium, Vasco da Gama, India.

So far there are not any regulations concerning the list of sports that should be included in the Games schedule. The sports chosen for the 1st edition were discussed and deliberated by the ACOLOP's members on general assembly, but without any principle of future 'core' and 'rotating' sports from a list of approved ones.

However, on 14 October 2006, the president of the organizing committee for the 2009 Lusophony Games, José Vicente de Moura, mentioned the possibility of the ACOLOP proposing four or five core sports to be included on every future edition, plus the prerogative for the host country to propose three of four more to a maximum of nine sports. In 2009 edition (Lisbon) 1500 athletes participated from 12 countries. In the football tournament five U-20 national teams competed. The sport marked with an asterisk (*) means that it was a demonstration event.

=== Summer ===
- Aquatics Sports
  - Diving ()
  - Swimming ()
  - Synchronized swimming ()
  - Water polo ()
- Athletics ()
- Badminton ()
- Basketball ()
- Basketball 3x3 ()
- Beach volleyball ()
- Cycling ()
- Disabled sports ()
- Football ()
- Futsal ()
- Golf ()
- Gymnastics ()
- Judo ()
- Sailing ()
- Shooting ()
- Taekwondo ()
- Table tennis ()
- Tennis ()
- Triathlon ()
- Weightlifting ()
- Windsurfing ()
- Wrestling ()
- Wushu ()
- Volleyball ()

=== Winter ===
- Alpine skiing ()
- Biathlon ()
- Cross-country skiing ()
- Curling ()

== See also ==
- ACOLOP
- CPLP Games
- Commonwealth Games
- Jeux de la Francophonie
- Mediterranean Games
