= List of marathon races in Europe =

The following is a list of marathon races in Europe.

== Legend ==
Symbol/Column	Description
**Bold**	Bold faced races are included in the World Marathon Majors
	Platinum
	Gold
	Elite
	Label
(year)	Defunct

== Race list ==
Label of races updated as 2026 World Athletics Label Road Races.

Name	City	Country	Month* _{*Last race was held}	Inception	Ref	Link
Alexander the Great Marathon	Pella–Thessaloniki	Greece	April	2006		
Amsterdam Marathon	Amsterdam	Netherlands	October	1975		
Antwerp Marathon	Antwerp	Belgium	April	1980		
Athens Classic Marathon	Athens	Greece	November	1972		
Barcelona Marathon	Barcelona	Spain	March	1978		
Belgrade Marathon	Belgrade	Serbia	April	1988		
**Berlin Marathon**	Berlin	Germany	September	1974		
Belfast City Marathon	Belfast	Northern Ireland	May	1982		
Birmingham International Marathon	Birmingham	England	October	2017		
Bournemouth Marathon	Bournemouth	England	October	2013		
Bratislava Marathon	Bratislava	Slovakia	April	2006		
Brighton Marathon	Brighton	England	April	2010		
Bristol + Bath Marathon (2015)	Bristol	England	October	2015		
Brocken Marathon	Wernigerode	Germany	October	1978		
Brussels Marathon	Brussels	Belgium	October	1984		
Bucharest Marathon	Bucharest	Romania	October	2008		
Budapest Marathon	Budapest	Hungary	October	1984		
Cardiff Marathon (inactive since 2006)	Cardiff	Wales	October	1981		
Castellón Marathon	Castellón de la Plana	Spain	February	2010		
Chișinău International Marathon	Chișinău	Republic of Moldova	April	2015		
Cologne Marathon	Cologne	Germany	October	1997		
Connemarathon	Galway	Ireland	April	2001		
Copenhagen Marathon	Copenhagen	Denmark	May	1980		
Cracovia Marathon	Kraków	Poland	April	2002		
Dingle Marathon	Dingle	Ireland	October	2009		
Dublin Marathon	Dublin	Ireland	October	1980		
Düsseldorf Marathon	Düsseldorf	Germany	May	2003		
Edinburgh Marathon	Edinburgh	Scotland	May	2003		
Eindhoven Marathon	Eindhoven	Netherlands	October	1982		
Empúries Marathon	L'Escala	Spain	April	2003		
Enschede Marathon	Enschede	Netherlands	April	1947		
Florence Marathon	Florence	Italy	November	1984		
Frankfurt Marathon	Frankfurt am Main	Germany	October	1981		
Geneva Marathon	Geneva	Switzerland	May	2005		
Ghent Marathon	Ghent	Belgium	March	2017		
Göteborg Marathon	Gothenburg	Sweden	October	1972		
Gran Canaria Maratón	Las Palmas de Gran Canaria	Spain	January	2010		
H.C. Andersen Marathon	Odense	Denmark	September	1999		
Hannover Marathon	Hannover	Germany	April	1991		
Hamburg Marathon	Hamburg	Germany	April	1986		
Helsingborg Marathon	Helsingborg	Sweden	September	2014		
Helsinki City Marathon	Helsinki	Finland	August	1980		
Istanbul Marathon	Istanbul	Turkey	October	1979		
Italian Marathon	Maranello to Carpi	Italy	October	1988		
Jersey Marathon	Jersey	Jersey	October	2006		
Jungfrau Marathon	Interlaken	Switzerland	September	1993		
Kladno Marathon	Kladno	Czech Republic	September	2002		
Košice Peace Marathon	Košice	Slovakia	October	1924		
Kyiv Marathon	Kyiv	Ukraine	October	2010		
La Rochelle Marathon	La Rochelle	France	November	1991		
Lausanne Marathon	Lausanne	Switzerland	October	1993		
Limassol Marathon	Limassol	Cyprus	March	2006		
Lisbon Marathon	Lisbon	Portugal	October	1986		
Ljubljana Marathon	Ljubljana	Slovenia	October	1996		
Loch Ness Marathon	Whitebridge to Inverness	Scotland	October	2001		
**London Marathon**	London	England	April	1981		
Luxembourg Marathon	Luxembourg	Luxembourg	June	2006		
Madrid Marathon	Madrid	Spain	April	1978		
Malaga Marathon	Málaga	Spain	December	2010		
Man versus Horse Marathon	Llanwrtyd Wells	Wales	June	1980		
Manchester Marathon	Manchester	England	April	1908		
Marathon des Alpes-Maritimes	Nice to Cannes	France	November	2008		
Marathon du Médoc	Pauillac	France	September	1985		
Milano City Marathon	Milan	Italy	April	2000		
Milton Keynes Marathon	Milton Keynes	England	May	2012		
Monaco Marathon	Mostly Monaco, parts of France and Italy	Monaco	March	1997		
Moray Marathon (2016)	Moray	Scotland	September	1982		
Moscow Marathon	Moscow	Russia	September	2013		
Munich Marathon	Munich	Germany	October	1983		
Münster Marathon	Münster	Germany	September	2002		
Neujahrsmarathon Zürich	Schlieren	Switzerland	January	2005		
Nicosia Marathon	Nicosia	Cyprus	December	2010		
Nottingham Marathon (2017)	Nottingham	England	September	1981		
Nuuk Marathon	Nuuk	Greenland	August	1990		
Oslo Marathon	Oslo	Norway	September/October	1994		
Ostrava Marathon	Ostrava	Czech Republic	September	1954		
Orlen Warsaw Marathon (2020)	Warsaw	Poland	April	2013		
Paavo Nurmi Marathon (Turku)	Turku	Finland	July	1992		
Paris Marathon	Paris	France	April	1976		
Podgorica Marathon	Podgorica	Montenegro	October	1994		
Polar Circle Marathon	Kangerlussuaq	Greenland	October	2001		
Polytechnic Marathon (1996)	Chiswick	England	June	1909		
Porto Marathon	Porto	Portugal	October/November	2004		
Poznań Marathon	Poznań	Poland	October	2000		
Prague International Marathon	Prague	Czech Republic	May	1995		
Rajec Marathon	Rajec	Slovakia	August	1984		
Reims Marathon	Reims	France	October	1984		
Reykjavík Marathon	Reykjavík	Iceland	August	1984		
Rhein-Ruhr-Marathon	Duisburg	Germany	May	1981		
Riga Marathon	Riga	Latvia	May/June	1991		
Rome City Marathon	Rome	Italy	March	1982		
Rotterdam Marathon	Rotterdam	Netherlands	April	1981		
Seville Marathon	Seville	Spain	February	1985		
Siberian International Marathon	Omsk	Russia	August	1990		
Skopje Marathon	Skopje	North Macedonia	May	2009		
Snowdonia Marathon	Llanberis	Wales	October	1982		
Stockholm Marathon	Stockholm	Sweden	June	1979		
Sofia Marathon	Sofia	Bulgaria	October	1983		
Swiss City Marathon	Lucerne	Switzerland	October	2007		
Tallinn Marathon	Tallinn	Estonia	September	2000		
Three Hearts Marathon	Radenci	Slovenia	May	1981		
Tromsø Midnight Sun Marathon	Tromsø	Norway	June	1989		
Turin Marathon	Turin	Italy	November	1987		
Utrecht Marathon	Utrecht	Netherlands	April	1978		
Valencia Marathon	Valencia	Spain	December	1981		
Venice Marathon	Venice	Italy	October	1986		
Vienna Marathon	Vienna	Austria	April	1984		
Vilnius Marathon	Vilnius	Lithuania	September	2003		
Växjö Marathon	Växjö	Sweden	October	1984		
Wachau Marathon	Krems an der Donau	Austria	September	1998		
Warsaw Marathon	Warsaw	Poland	September	1979		
White Nights International Marathon	Saint Petersburg	Russia	June	1991		
Yorkshire Marathon	York	England	October	2013		
Zagreb Marathon	Zagreb	Croatia	October	1992		
Zürich Marathon	Zürich	Switzerland	April	2003		

== See also ==
- World Athletics Label Road Races
- World Marathon Majors
