= Rhein-Ruhr-Marathon =

The Rhein-Ruhr-Marathon is a marathon in Duisburg, which was first held in 1981. It is therefore one of the oldest city marathons in Germany. In addition to the classic 42.195 kilometer race, the current program also incorporates a half marathon, a marathon for inline-skaters and a wheelchair marathon.

== History ==
When, in 1981, the sport budget of the City of Duisburg had a sum of 8,000 DM at its disposal, Eintracht Duisburg 1848 audaciously applied for funding for its intention of setting up a marathon. With assistance from sponsors Thyssen Bautechnik, it succeeded in staging the race as a city marathon, directed in a clockwise fashion through 12 city districts – this was only the second city marathon to be held in Deutschland, after the Frankfurt Marathon which had been run for the first time in the spring of the same year. The then Oberbürgermeister Josef Krings personally fired the starting pistol for this first race on 18 September 1981, in the Sportpark Wedau . With 385 competitors making it to the finish, it admittedly lagged behind Frankfurt and the Berlin Marathon of one week later, which each notched up over 3,000 entrants. However the positive response to the first staging of the race lead to Duisburg also being able to report four-figure entrant numbers from 1983 onwards

In 1987 the Deutscher Leichtathletik-Verband conferred its championship on Duisburg, resulting in a record of 3155 runners reaching the finish line. The administration had by this time however taken on such proportions that the organizing club Eintracht Duisburg was reaching the limits of its capabilities. A decision over the future of the race was postponed when in 1989 Duisburg received the contract for the Universiade, whose marathon was staged within the framework of the Rhein-Ruhr Marathon. In 1990 however came a (temporary as it turned out) cessation.

In 1991 and 1992 a second attempt was undertaken with Eintracht Duisburg as organizers and the Duisburg Werbe- und Touristik GmbH, a municipal organization, as administrators. Competition with the considerably larger city marathons such as the Berlin Marathon, which was also staged in September, was however futile and so both organizers and administrators finally pulled out, resulting in the marathon failing to be staged in 1993 and 1994.

In 1995 a new beginning was undertaken by the Stadtsportbund Duisburg e. V. and the Lauf-Club Duisburg e.V., who still administer the race today, and a broader sporting outlook was followed. The direction of the race was altered so that now it went through the town in a counter-clockwise direction and the date was changed from Saturday afternoon to Sunday morning.

In 2000 an inline-skater event was entered into the program, in 2002 a half marathon and wheelchair marathon followed. The German Championships of 2000 and 2003 were staged within the framework of the Rhein-Ruhr Marathon.

== Course ==
The course consists of a full circuit. The start is in the Kruppstraße in the Sportpark Wedau, from where it goes through Neudorf to the city center. While the half-marathon course branches off here in a southern direction towards the Dellviertel, the marathon course leads to the Inner Harbor and then via Kasslerfeld and the Ruhr as far as Ruhrort. After a diversion through Meiderich it goes over the Friedrich-Ebert-Bridge taking you to the left bank of the Rhine (Rhein). From Alt-Homberg it turns South and goes via Essenberg and Hochemmerich to Rheinhausen. The Brücke der Solidarität takes it back over the Rhein into Hochfeld, where at the 28 km mark, it meets the half-marathon course coming in from the North. Shortly after this, the course turns to the South and leads via Wanheimerort, Buchholz and Huckingen as far as its southernmost point and then via Großenbaum and Wedau to the finish in the MSV-Arena.

== Statistics ==
=== Course records ===
- Male: 2:14:33, Tibor Baier (Hungary), 1989
- Female: 2:35:09, Irina Bogachova (Soviet Union), 1989

=== Winners 2008 ===
Marathon

- Male: Magnus Kreth, 2:33:18
- Female: Marlies Meyer, 2:58:17

Half Marathon

- Male: Boško Bjelajac, 1:13:58
- Female: Lisa Müller, 1:21:27

=== Finishers 2008 ===
Number reaching the finish

- Marathon: 1286 (1095 men and 191 women), 71 less than the previous year
- Half Marathon: 2874 (1996 man and 878 women), 625 more than the previous year

=== List of winners – Marathon ===
Sources: website of the organizers, arrs.run

Date	Men	Time	Women	Time
9 June 2013	Magnus Kreth	2:36:44	Vanessa Rösler	3:02:18
20 May 2012	Samson Kosgei (KEN)	2:32:03	Dorothea Frey (GER)	2:56:41
29 May 2011	Richjard Ngolepus (KEN)	2:30:30	Silvia Krull (GER)	2:46:16
30 May 2010	Magnus Kreth	2:29:43	Antje Möller	2:58:41
7 June 2009	Sascha Velten (GER)	2:32:16	Marlies Meyer	2:56:56
1 June 2008	Magnus Kreth -2-	2:33:18	Marlies Meyer	2:58:17
29 April 2007	Robert Jäkel	2:33:57	Martina Schwanke	2:55:32
30 April 2006	Magnus Kreth	2:30:07	Antje Möller -3-	2:56:30
5 June 2005	Volker Dorn	2:35:12	Antje Möller -2-	3:12:42
6 June 2004	Karsten Kruck	2:35:23	Ulrike Ewald	3:09:11
1 June 2003	Michael Fietz	2:23:15	Sylvia Renz	2:41:57
26 May 2002	Salvatore Di Dio	2:27:10	Alexandra Zaparty	3:08:40
27 May 2001	Carsten Breidenbach -3-	2:30:21	Antje Möller	3:06:42
30 April 2000	Matthias Körner	2:20:04	Ines Cronjäger	2:40:57
30 May 1999	Winfried Spanaus -3-	2:32:12	Heike Säger	2:58:11
24 May 1998	Carsten Breidenbach -2-	2:24:53	Andrea Thieken	2:45:07
25 May 1997	Carsten Breidenbach	2:27:13	Svetlana Waack	2:57:12
22 May 1996	Winfried Spanaus -2-	2:25:58	Bärbel Halfmann -2-	2:56:09
17 September 1995	Winfried Spanaus	2:25:22	Bärbel Halfmann	2:55:40
19 September 1992	Jean Weyts (BEL)	2:20:39	Olga Parlyuk (RUS)	2:38:30
21 September 1991	Thomas Eickmann	2:17:55	Birgit Lennartz -4-	2:43:30
26 August 1989	Tibor Baier (HUN)	2:14:33	Irina Bogachova (URS)	2:35:09
24 September 1988	Jan Huruk (POL)	2:17:11	Irena Hulanicka (POL)	2:47:23
26 September 1987	Régis Ancel (FRA)	2:17:32	Monika Lövenich	2:38:26
27 September 1986	Edi Kaul	2:18:18	Gaby Wolf	2:38:13
28 September 1985	Wiesław Dubiel -2-	2:17:34	Bernadette Hudy	2:46:13
15 September 1984	Wiesław Dubiel (POL)	2:18:07	Birgit Lennartz -3-	2:42:18
17 September 1983	Jean-Pierre Crochon (FRA)	2:16:55	Birgit Lennartz -2-	2:43:23
18 September 1982	Jerzy Kowol (POL)	2:21:16	Birgit Lennartz	3:05:57
19 September 1981	Manfred Brucks	2:26:36	Mary-Ann Christen-Meyer	2:53:50

=== List of winners – Half Marathon ===
Jahr	Männer	Zeit	Frauen	Zeit
2008	Boško Bjelajac	1:13:58	Lisa Müller - 3 -	1:21:27
2007	Oliver Minzlaff - 3 -	1:06:41	Lisa Müller - 2 -	1:23:40
2006	Oliver Minzlaff - 2 -	1:05:06	Lisa Müller	1:24:52
2005	Muharrem Yilmaz	1:13:15	Svenja Jütte	1:24:21
2004	Oliver Minzlaff	1:06:51	Ulrike Hoeltz	1:22:46
2003	Moses Cheserek (KEN)	1:08:13	Rosemarie Kössler	1:22:31
2002	Carsten Thoma	1:08:40	Bärbel Halfmann	1:24:18

=== Finishers year by year ===
Year	Marathon			Half Marathon		
Year	Total	Men	Women	Total	Men	Women
2008	1286	1095	191	2874	1996	878
2007	1357	1161	196	2246	1657	589
2006	2214	1842	372	3223	2147	1076
2005	1344	1183	161	2585	1875	710
2004	1575	1378	197	2332	1690	642
2003	2103	1787	316	1664	1211	453
2002	2152	1897	255	???	???	???
2001	1742	1515	227	---	---	---
2000	2592	2249	343	---	---	---
1999	1867	1675	192	---	---	---
1998	1643	1481	162	---	---	---
1997	1620	1465	155	---	---	---
1996	1655	1486	169	---	---	---
1995	1671	1486	185	---	---	---
1992	1404	1309	95	---	---	---
1991	1703	1559	144	---	---	---
1989	1903	1781	122	---	---	---
1988	2135	1990	145	---	---	---
1987	3155	2913	242	---	---	---
1986	2628	2481	147	---	---	---
1985	2145	2006	139	---	---	---
1984	1258	1000	58	---	---	---
1983	1005	966	39	---	---	---
1982	616	589	27	---	---	---
1981	385	368	17	---	---	---

== See also ==
- List of marathon races in Europe
