= Julius Kiprono Tarus =

Kenyan long-distance runner

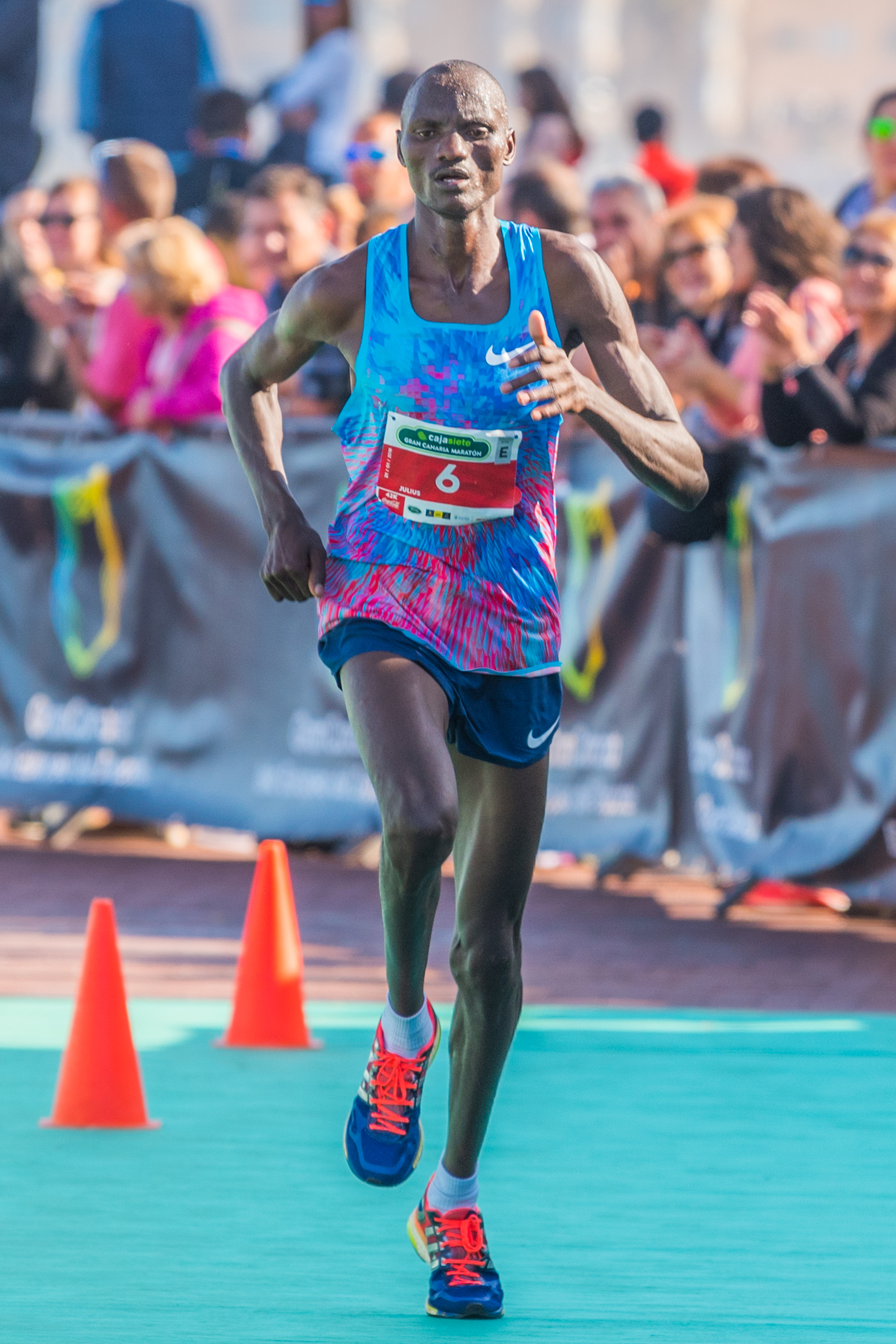
- Tarus at the 2018 Gran Canaria Marathon

Personal information
- Born: 11 November 1991 (age 34) Kenya

Sport
- Country: Kenya
- Sport: Athletics
- Events: Marathon; Half marathon

Achievements and titles
- Personal bests: Marathon: 2:07:35 (Eindhoven 2019); Half marathon: 1:04:35 (Azpeitia 2024)

Julius Kiprono Tarus (born 11 November 1991) is a long-distance runner from Nakuru, Kenya.

Tarus was amongst the poorest racers in Nakuru, dedicating his time and talent to long-distance running. Living on one meal a day, as a young adult, he would work on farms for up to 5 hours a day, earning the equivalent of just over 1 British pound per day to continue his training.

Tarus came seventh in his 5000m preliminary heat for the Kenyan Athletics team in 2016, qualifying for the finals which were later cancelled. He won a bronze medal at the Brussels Marathon in 2017 and a gold medal at the Gran Canaria Maratón in 2019, setting a new course record with a time of 2 hours, 12 minutes and 5 seconds.

At the Eindhoven Marathon on 13 October 2019, Julius placed 4th in a personal best time of 2 hours, 7 minutes and 35 seconds.

On 22 December 2019, Tarus won the Guangzhou Huangpu men's marathon championship in 2 hours, 11 minutes and 47 seconds.
