= Swiss City Marathon =

Annual race in Switzerland held since 2007

- Location: Lucerne, Switzerland
- Event type: Road
- Distance: Marathon
- Primary sponsor: Coop
- Established: 2007 (19 years ago)
- Course records: Men's: 2:26:18.1 (2015) (Switzerland) Fabian Kürt; Women's: 2:39:14.9 (2013) (Switzerland) Martina Strähl
- Website: Swiss City Marathon
- Participants: 1,151 finishers (2021); 1,064 finishers (2019); 1,020 finishers (2018)

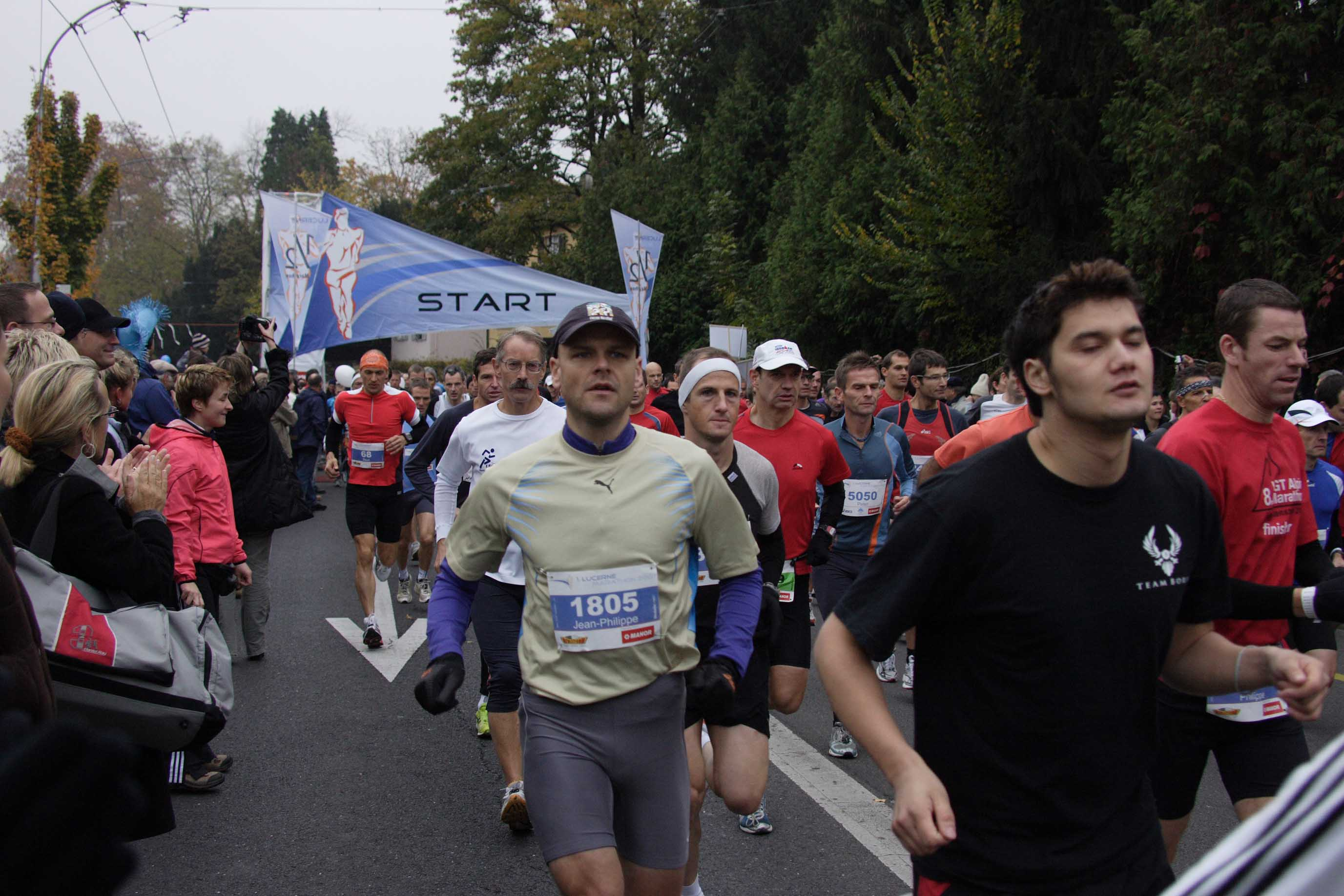
Start line at inaugural race in 2007

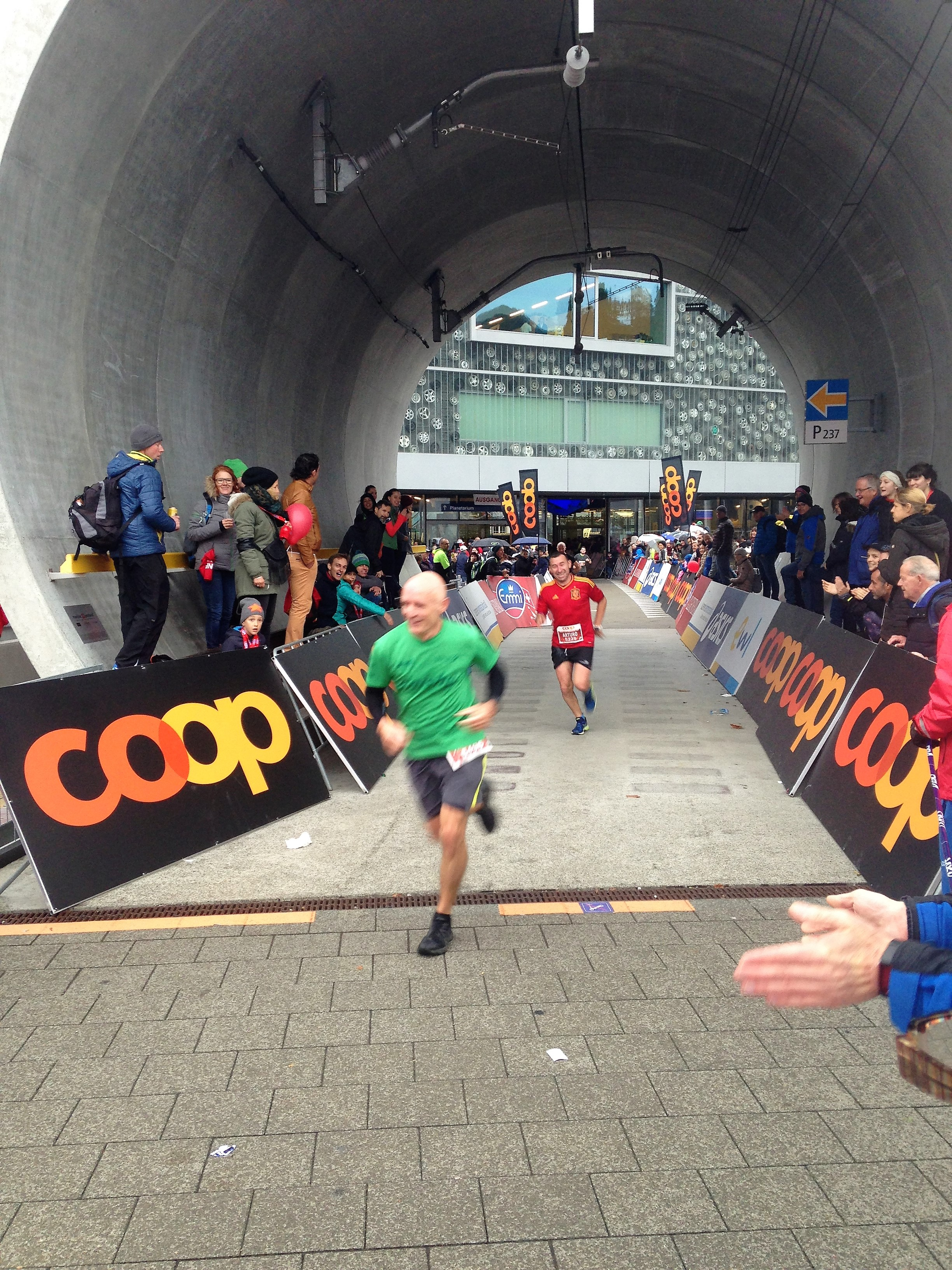
Approaching the finish line at the Swiss Museum of Transport in 2017

The Swiss City Marathon is a marathon in Lucerne, first held in 2007. A half marathon and a "try-out marathon" (Schnuppermarathon) of 13 km are also part of the programme.

== History ==
The marathon was held for the first time on 28 October 2007. With 5594 finishers, the premiere was the largest first edition of a running event in Switzerland and the Lucerne Marathon became at once the third largest Swiss marathon after the Zürich Marathon and Jungfrau Marathon.

The 2020 in-person edition of the race was cancelled due to the coronavirus pandemic, with all registrants given the option of registering for free for 2021, obtaining a voucher for the marathon valid until 2023 (minus a 10 CHF handling fee), or obtaining a refund (minus a 20 CHF handling fee).

== Course ==
The course is a circuit with the length of a half marathon, which starts and finishes at the Swiss Transport Museum. The track runs first along the "Haldenstrasse", passing by the chapel royal and the traditional luxury hotels of the city. Departing from "Schwanenplatz", the runners cross the pier from where they can see the famous chapel bridge and the water tower as well as the Old Town. On the other side of the lake, the track passes by the Lucerne Culture and Congress Centre built by Jean Nouvel, around the Horwer peninsula and along Lake Lucerne with a view of the impressive Alpine panorama of Central Switzerland. From Horw, where the finish line of the "try-out marathon" (Schnuppermarathon) is located; the course leads through the Allmend stadium back to the pier and to the Swiss Transport Museum.

== Management ==
It is organised by the Lucerne Marathon Association.

Viktor Röthlin, currently best Swiss marathon runner, has become the ambassador of the race.

== Winners ==
Key: Course record

Ed.	Year	Men's winner	Time	Women's winner	Time	Rf.
1	2007	Urs Christen (SUI) (Note: From Rotkreuz.)	2:33:02.5	Addis Gezahegne (SUI) (Note: From Kriens.)	2:53:27.9	
2	2008	Pius Hunold (SUI) (Note: From Benken, St. Gallen.)	2:31:35.2	Stefanie Schillig-Planzer (SUI) (Note: From Altdorf, Uri.)	3:00:10.5	
3	2009	René Hauser (SUI)	2:27:38.7	Helga Rauch (ITA)	2:56:56.1	
4	2010	Stefan Müller (SUI)	2:35:47.6	Julia Wagner (GER)	2:47:36.0	
5	2011	Woody Schoch (SUI)	2:32:08.6	~~Lauren Jeska (GBR)~~ (Note: All (Note: Although multiple sources state that "her racing results [had been] declared null and void", it is unclear which results had been invalidated, as the 2011 results of the Swiss City Marathon still list her as the winner, and World Athletics still lists many of her results.) Jeska's athletics results were declared null and void when she failed to produce samples of her testosterone levels.)	~~2:48:17.0~~	
6	2012	Patrick Jeanneret (SUI)	2:36:02.1	Lucia Mayer (SUI)	2:49:01.3	
7	2013	Bartosz Olszewski (POL)	2:31:15.2	Martina Strähl (SUI)	2:39:14.9	
8	2014	Reto Dietiker (SUI)	2:30:19.6	Franziska Inauen (SUI)	2:55:50.8	
9	2015	Fabian Kuert (SUI)	2:26:18.1	Conny Berchtold (SUI)	2:45:20.0	
10	2016	Stefan Trummer (SUI)	2:30:23.6	Susanne Rüegger (SUI)	2:40:23.9	
11	2017	Fabian Anrig (SUI)	2:27:22.8	Franziska Inauen (SUI)	2:52:49.0	
12	2018	Elias Gemperli (SUI)	2:27:52.9	Franziska Inauen (SUI)	2:51:07.1	
13	2019	Kay-Uwe Müller (GER)	2:27:04.4	Franziska Inauen (SUI)	2:55:03.5	
	2020	cancelled due to coronavirus pandemic				
14	2021	T-Roy Brown (USA)	2:29:21	Patrizia Morceli (SUI)	2:59:30	

== Statistic ==
=== 28 October 2007 ===
Fastest Runner Half Marathon

- Men: Daniel Renggli, Luzern, 1:11.30,3
- Women: Renata Bucher, Littau, 1:21.16,2

Finisher

- Marathon: 2713 (2136 men und 577 women)
- Half Marathon: 2263 (1403 men und 860 women)
- Try-out Marathon: 419 (190 men und 229 women)

=== 26 October 2008 ===
Fastest Runner Halbmarathon

- Men: Ueli Koch, Schwendibach, 1:07.48,7
- Women: Addis Gezahegne, Kriens, 1:18.54,6

Finisher

- Marathon:2303 (1837 men und 466 women)
- Half Marathon:3947 (2562 men und 1385 women)
- Try-out Marathon:385 (161 men und 224 women)

== See also ==
- List of marathon races in Europe
