= Chișinău Marathon =

Annual race in Moldova held since 2015

- Date: September or October
- Location: Chișinău, Moldova
- Event type: Road
- Distance: Marathon, Half marathon, 10k, 5k
- Primary sponsor: 999.md
- Established: 2015 (11 years ago)
- Course records: Men's: 2:16:39 (2018) (Kenya) Benjamin Serem; Women's: 2:48:35 (2017) (Moldova) Olesea Smovjenco
- Website: Official website
- Participants: 178 finishers (2021); 257 (2019)

The Chisinau International Marathon is an annual marathon and sport event hosted by the city of Chișinău, Moldova since 2015. It is usually held in the autumn.

== History ==
=== 2015 ===
The first Chisinau International Marathon was held on April 26, 2015; it became the first Chisinau Marathon race since 1986. It was organized by the public sports organization Sporter.md with the support of the Ministry of Youth and Sports of Moldova and the sponsorship of the oil and gas company - Petrom. The organizer and the sponsor provided in equal parts the competition budget: 1 billion MDL. The marathon preparation took about a year, and 300 volunteers participated in this process. Marathon competitions included 4 distanced: marathon (participation fee 200 MDL), half-marathon, 10 km (participation fee 100 MDL each) and 3 km (so-called Fun Run, free of charge). One day before the competition, a sports fair was organized in the center of Chișinău, as well as a 400 meters running competition for children, who were divided into three age categories: 5–6 years, 7–9 years and 10–12 years. In 2015, about 10,000 people participated, of whom almost 1,400 took the main three distances and 140 - the marathon. Citizens of Moldova and other countries - Austria, Belarus, Germany, India, USA, Russia, Ukraine and Sweden - could be seen among the runners. Journalists noticed among the participants the Mayor of Chișinău - Dorin Chirtoacă, the Head of Economic Department of EU Delegation to the Republic of Moldova - Wicher Slagter and the British Ambassador - Philip Batson.

=== 2016 ===
The second edition was held on April 17, 2016. It was organized by the public sports organization Sporter.md with the support of the Ministry of Youth and Sports of Moldova and the sponsorship of the oil and gas company - Petrom. Over 15,000 people gathered in the central square in Chisinau to run the marathon (42 km 195 m), half-marathon (21 km 0975 m), 10 km and the Fun Run (3 km). In the framework of the event, a sports fair was organized, which was attended by over 30 companies. The day before the official start of the Chisinau Marathon, a 200-meter children's race was organized for several age categories. About 400 volunteers helped the organizers in the preparation process and on the very day of the marathon. Guests from over 50 countries, politicians, professional athletes of various sports, as well as various commercial companies and charity organizations participated in the Chisinau Marathon.

=== 2017 ===
The third edition was held on October 1, 2017. On this day, the Moldovan capital became the center of attraction for all running enthusiasts and active lifestyle practitioners. The Chisinau Marathon became a new experience in the running career for both local and foreign athletes, who came from over 50 countries. The marathon was organized by the public sports organization Sporter.md with the sponsorship of Kaufland supermarket chain. This year, 17,000 people participated in the Chisinau Marathon. Participants were offered 5 distances to choose from: marathon (42 km 195 m), half-marathon (21 km 0975 m), 5 km, 10 km and the Fun Run (1.5 km). A day before, on September 30, as a part of Chisinau Marathon, was organized a 200-meter children's race for three age categories: 5–6 years, 7–9 years and 10–12 years. 400 children participated. For three days, a sports fair was opened in the center of Chisinau. Various sport brands, charity organizations and commercial companies took part in the fair.

=== 2018 ===
The fourth edition was held on September 30, 2018. According to established tradition, both professional sportsmen and beginners who had their first marathon challenge could participate in the event. The event was attended by the representatives of more than 50 countries. By organizers account, more than 2,000 foreign athletes took part in the Chisinau Marathon. This year, 18,000 people attended the Marathon. Participants were offered 5 distances to choose from: marathon (42 km 195 m), half-marathon (21 km 0975 m), 5 km, 10 km and the Fun Run (1.5 km). For the first time in the Chisinau Marathon history, a category for wheelchair athletes was open - “Marathon for All”. Kenyan runner, Benjamin Kiprop Serem, set the track record: he ran 42 km in 2 hours 16 minutes 38 seconds. Also, half-marathon records were set. A day earlier, on September 29, as a part of Chisinau Marathon, children's races were organized: 400 m, 800 m, 1 200 m, 2 000 m. 500 children participated in the event. Also on this day, famous travelers - Olga Rumyantseva and Vladimir Kotlyar, as well as marathon athletes - Yaroslav Mushinsky and Leonid Shvetsov, gave public lectures.

=== 2019 ===
In 2019, the Chisinau Marathon celebrated its fifth anniversary. This edition took place on September 29 under the slogan: “High five!”.

Traditionally, the races on the 5 distances of the Marathon – marathon (42 km 195 m), half marathon (21 km 0975 m), 10 and 5 km races, Fun Run (1.5 km) – took place on the central streets of the capital. The “Marathon for All” distance was also reopened for wheelchair athletes.

As in previous years, both experienced athletes and participants who have just started their passion for running were allowed to participate in the races. According to the organizers, in 2019, about 20,000 participants gathered in the Great National Assembly Square in Chisinau, including participants from other countries, such as Ukraine, Russia, Romania, Germany, etc.

The winners were the male and female participants who were the first to reach the finish line on the chosen course. In 2019, some competitors managed to outdo the previous records. Thus, in the half-marathon distance, Maxim Răilianu finished in 1:06:11.9 (previous record – 1:06:12.0), and Katerina Karmanenko set a record in the women's race – 1:20:16.3 (previous record – 1:20:43.0).

On September 28, the Kids Run Day children's races was held as part of the Chisinau Marathon. Children between 5 and 13 years old participated in the 400 m, 800 m, 1200 m and 2000 m races.

=== 2020 ===
Anyone could support the event and participate in the race online. To do so, the organizers suggested participants to wear a T-shirt from previous editions of the Chisinau Marathon, choose any of the distances: 1.5 km, 5 km, 10 km, 21 km or 42 km and take the start on 27 September at 9:00, anywhere in the city, in the country or in the world.

On this day, not only runners from Chisinau, but also from Ungheni, Balti, Soroca, various cities in Transnistria, as well as from the US, Italy, Romania, Greece and even India ran in support of the Chisinau Online 2020 International Marathon.

=== 2021 ===
In 2021, the sixth edition of the Chisinau International Marathon took place. It was the first major sporting event organized by Sporter after a year and a half of the COVID-19 pandemic.

The marathon was held on October 17, but under strict conditions. Only athletes who were able to present health certificates were accepted to participate. Free express coronavirus tests were performed for participants and supporters. For safety reasons, the number of slots in 2021 has been reduced to 2,000, and the Fun Run distance (1.5 km), which traditionally was attended by all those who wish to participate, has been canceled.

As in previous years, competitors had four basic distances they could choose from: marathon (42 km 195 m), half marathon (21 km 0975 m), 10 km and 5 km. For the first time, the 5-km route has been modified. In 2021, the already traditional distance for wheelchair athletes “Marathon for All” was also available, and there were 35 participants.

On October 16, the Kids Run Day children's race was held as part of the Chisinau Marathon.

=== 2022 ===
In 2022, the eighth edition of the Chisinau International Marathon took place. Paying tribute to kind-hearted and hospitable Moldovans, the organizers carried out large-scale rebranding, and now the race is called Chisinau Big Hearts Marathon.

The race was held on September 25. Altogether about 10,000 athletes from different countries participated.

The organizers have prepared 5 main distances for athletes: marathon (42 km 195 m), half marathon (21 km 0975 m), 10K, 5K and Fun Run (1.5K). Fun Run is a free race held for the first time after two years of COVID-19 pandemic restrictions. For the fourth year in a row, the Marathon for All was arranged for wheelchair athletes. On September 23, there was a Kids Run Day race for children in four age categories: 5–6 years old, 7–8 years old, 9–10 years old, and 11–13 years old.

On the occasion of the race, festive events such as fairs and contests have been held for three days in the center of the Moldavian capital. On the evening of September 23, before the big start, a traditional free Pasta Party was given for participants.

The organizers of the party were Sporter public organization and 999.md online classifieds, with the support of Chisinau City Hall. The event was supported by a team of 200 volunteers and about 30 partners.

=== 2023 ===
In 2023, the Chisinau Big Hearts Marathon kicked off for the ninth time. The country's main running event took place under the slogan "The marathon is more than just a race. It's proof that we are together."

The marathon-related events lasted two days: September 23 and 24. In total, more than 10,000 people from 46 countries participated in the races. Participants competed in four main distances: marathon (42 km 195 m), half-marathon (21 km 975 m), 10 km, and 5 km. Additionally, a free non-competitive race, Fun Run, for all those interested took place over a distance of 1.5 km. Marathon for All was organized for wheelchair athletes, and children had their starts as part of the Kids Run Day. Winners received prizes and gifts from sponsors, and all athletes who completed the chosen competitive distance within the set time limits were awarded finisher's medals.

The organizer of the Chisinau Big Hearts Marathon is the public sports organization Sporter, which has remained the sole organizer of marathon races in Moldova for over 10 years, as well as 999.md - the most popular online ad board in our country. In 2023, the marathon took place with the support of the City Hall of the Chisinau municipality and the General Direction of Education, Youth and Sport, as well as over 30 partner companies and organizations. The marathon's general partner was the VISA payment system.

=== 2024 ===
In 2024, the Chisinau Marathon took place in Chisinau. “We have been loving sport for 10 years” was the slogan of the event. The country's largest running event has been held for 10 years. During this time, it has included many local participants and international runners traveling to Moldova.

Athletes from 52 countries took part in the anniversary marathon, with more than 10,000 participants in total. In keeping with tradition, the races were held over two days.

On September 28, the Kids Marathon took place, with over 800 youngsters taking part. Boys and girls competed separately in age groups: 5-6 years, 7-8 years, 9-10 years and 11-13 years.

On September 29, the main adult races were held: 5 km, 10 km, half marathon (21,975 km) and marathon (42,195 km). Wheelchair athletes competed in the Marathon for All event. Chisinau Marathon also kicked off with Roller Run - roller races. There was also a free non-competitive Fun Run, a 1.5 km race for amateur runners.

All those who managed to finish the race within the time limit were awarded finisher's medals, specially created for the anniversary marathon. The winners were presented with gifts and prizes from sponsors.

The 10th Chisinau Marathon, 14-year-old Mihail Voloshin became the youngest runner ever to finish the 42,195 km Chisinau Marathon. Mihail first participated in the marathon at the age of 5 - the youngest age allowed for participation in the Chisinau Marathon. This time he managed to successfully run the main distance.

Another special moment took place at the finish line of the 10 km race, where Gabriel Cretu proposed to Ana Hariton. The two have been practicing sports for many years, participating in numerous marathons. Gabriel chose this anniversary marathon to propose to Ana, making the 10th Chisinau Marathon a memorable one for the couple.

The organizer of Chisinau Marathon is the public association Sports Club Sporter. The marathon was held with the support of the Chisinau City Hall and the General Directorate of Education, Youth and Sport of the Chisinau Municipality (DGETS), as well as the Ministry of Education and Research. The Police Inspectorate, Carabinieri and the Emergency Medical Assistance Service also contributed. The Sport for All Federation and the National Roller Sport Federation also supported the sporting event.

About 40 companies and organizations acted as sponsors and partners for Chisinau Marathon, and the general partner was 999.md.

=== 2025 ===
The Chisinau Marathon 2025 took place in Chișinău, Republic of Moldova, on 13–14 September 2025. It was the 11th edition of the competition. The event gathered more than 10,000 runners from 58 countries.

13 September

The first day featured children’s races (Kids Run Day) with more than 700 participants aged between 5 and 13. The race distances ranged from 400 m to 2000 m, depending on the age category.

In the afternoon, the organizers hosted the traditional Mămăligă Party, designed to provide participants with an extra supply of carbohydrates before the main races scheduled for the following day.

14 September

The second day included the main races: 42.195 km (marathon), 21.0975 km (half marathon), 10 km, and 5 km. An inclusive competition, Marathon for All (M4All), was also held, with more than 70 wheelchair athletes completing the distances of 5 km, 10 km, and 21 km. On the same day, the non-competitive Fun Run (1.5 km) also took place.

Results

At the 2025 edition, two course records were set on the 21 km distance:

Ivan Siuris — 1:05:30

Ecaterina Cernat — 1:17:41

Marathon (42 km)

Women: Natalia Zbîrnea, Anastasia Komleva, Anastasia Burunova

Men: Vitalie Gheorghiță, Bogdan Postolachi, Gabriel Crețu

Half Marathon (21 km)

Women: Ecaterina Cernat, Daria Stelmakh, Ludmila Șeremet

Men: Ivan Siuris, Gheorghe Buzulan, Tudor Cebotari

10 km

Women: Andreea Stăvilă, Rodica Sorici, Otilia Naftanailă

Men: Mihail Sprîncean, Nicolai Gorbușco, Adrian Șchiopu

5 km

Women: Mihaela Botnari, Iulia Pasa, Nicoleta Mocanu

Men: Vladislav Ivancenco, Vlad Tabacari, Andrei Pantelișin

Medal

The medal awarded to participants was part of a three-piece collection for 2025, alongside those from the Chisinau 10K Night Run and the Chisinau Half Marathon.

Organizers

The event was organized by the public association Sporter Sports Club, with the support of the Chișinău City Hall, the General Directorate of Education, Youth and Sports, as well as other public institutions. The event was also supported by the Police Inspectorate, the Carabinieri Troops, and the Emergency Medical Service.

== Course ==
External image
- Course map of full marathon in 2019

The marathon and half-marathon course: Great National Assembly Square (opposite the Triumphal Arch) - Stefan cel Mare Av. - Ciuflea St. - Dacia Av. (to Trandafirilor St.) - Dacia Av. - Ciuflea St. - Stefan cel Mare Av. (to Toma Ciorba St.) - Stefan cel Mare Av. - Great National Assembly Square (4 laps of 10.5 km for marathoners and 2 laps of 10.5 km for half-marathoners with time limit of 6 hours and 3 hours, respectively). 10 km course: Stefan cel Mare Av. - Ciuflea St. - Dacia Av. (to Trandafirilor St.) - Dacia Av. - Ciuflea St. - Stefan cel Mare Av. (to Toma Ciorba St.) - Stefan cel Mare Av. - Great National Assembly Square (with 1.5 hours time limit). 5 km course: Great National Assembly Square - turn at the intersection of Stefan cel Mare Av. and Ismail St. - Stefan cel Mare Av. - turn at the intersection of Stefan cel Mare Av. and Toma Ciorba St. - Stefan cel Mare Av. - Great National Assembly Square. Fun Run route: Great National Assembly Square - Vasile Alecsandri St. - Veronica Micle St. - Banulescu Bodoni St. - Finish in front of the Stefan cel Mare monument.

== Qualification ==
Runners over the age of 18 years are allowed to participate in the marathon and half-marathon, runners from 16 years old can participate in the 10 km race, but all need to be registered. The 1.5 km race is open for everybody and does not require registration.

== Other races ==
In addition to the marathon, the event includes a half marathon, a 10 km race, (Note: This race is marketed as a 10K, but is actually a quarter marathon, since runners in this race simply run the same loop that marathoners run, except they run it only once instead of four times.) and a 3 km fun run.

== Winners ==
Year	Male winner	Country	Time	Female winner	Country	Time
2015	Vitalie Gheorghiță	Moldova	2:42:08	Aleksandra Kirillova	Ukraine	3:33:43
2016	Vitalie Gheorghiţă	Moldova	2:27:53	Nadezhda Anfimova	Russia	3:21:40
2017	Nicolai Gorbuşco	Moldova	2:27:14	Olesea Smovjenco	Moldova	2:48:35
2018	Benjamin Serem	Kenya	2:16:39	Iryna Masnyk	Ukraine	2:53:55
2019	Andrei Bogaci	Moldova	2:32:21	Zinaida Săcară	Moldova	2:56:43
2020	postponed due to coronavirus pandemic					
2021	Ivan Siuris	Moldova	2:22:03	Zinaida Săcară	Moldova	3:02:54
2022	Vitalie Gheorghiţă	Moldova	2:30:08	Yuliya Tarasova	Ukraine	3:00:36
2023	Vitalie Gheorghiţă	Moldova	2:38:17	Zinaida Săcară	Moldova	3:13:22
2024	Nicolai Gorbuşco	Moldova	2:32:57	Yuliya Tarasova	Ukraine	2:58:13
2025	Vitalie Gheorghita	Moldova	2:29:40	Natalia Zbirnea	Moldova	3:09:26
