= Simpals =

Moldovan online services group

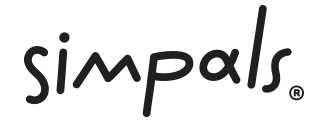
- Type: Public
- Founded: 1st of April 2002
- Founder: Dmitri Voloshin
- Headquarters: Chișinău
- Key people: Dmitry Voloshin (Chief Executive Officer); Roman Stirbu (Chief Executive Officer)
- Products: 999.md; point.md; stiri.md; sporter.md; mama.md; forum.md; marathon.md; afisha.md; play.md; tigan.md; garage.md; monsters.md
- Number of employees: 160 (2021)

Simpals (in English is spelled "sim-pals") is a group of Moldovan companies that provide online services. Simpals has a large animation studio.

Simpals is the leader of the online advertising market in Moldova. The Simpals portals reaches almost 75% of the Moldovan internet. Simpals made the first online video broadcast in Moldova and was the first company to sponsor a marathon in Moldova.

Today Simpals has about 200 employees. The Founder and CEO is Dmitri Voloshin and the CEO is Roman Shtirbu.

== Operations ==
=== Web portals ===
As of 2023, Simpals owned 33 portals and products. Simpals web platforms are visited by approximately 1.3 million unique visitors per month (over 70% of all internet users from Moldova).

=== Online advertising ===
In 2011, Simpals had 48% market share of online advertising.

=== Animation and computer graphics ===
The Simpals animation studio portfolio includes over 100 video ads and 6 short animations, one of which was designed in VR. In 2008, the company started work on the 3D animation film "The Gipsy". In 2010, Simpals opened a computer graphics and animation school: “The School of Monsters”.

=== Social activity ===
In 2014 Simpals launched an art project, called "Chișinău Is ME". In 2015, together with Sporter.md, Simpals organized the first Chișinău International Marathon. In 2017, Simpals created: Verde.md.

=== Venture investment; ===
In 2011, Simpals launches the first venture incubator – "Simpals Garage", but its development was dropped several years later. In 2022, another similar project is launched – "Simpals Factory" – a Venture Startup Studio with €1 000 000 equity capital.

=== Hardware ===
In 2016, Simpals created the first freediving weight system: Lobster Neck Weight. In 2019, Garage - Simpals startup project - initiated a new product: Sonr, which is an underwater walkie-talkie for swimmers and coaches.

The company's customers include Orange Moldova, Moldcell, Nestle, British American Tobacco-Moldova, Microsoft — Moldova, Moldtelecom, Efes Vitanta Moldova Brewery (EVMB), Lafarge, Kraft Foods, Хортица, Audi, Volkswagen, Finlandia Vodka, Procter & Gambel, President.

== History ==
=== 2002 ===
On April 1, 2002 Simpals was registered in Chișinău by Dmitri Voloshin. On November 14, 2002 Simpals moved into a new office. The company had 4 employees. The job market – Joblist.md was launched. As part of the MTV Music Awards 2002, Simpals received the award for best special effects in the music video created for "O-Zone" band.

=== 2003 ===
At the "WebTop 2003" contest, Simpals received 2 awards for economic development of the 999.md site. Due to the company's growth, Simpals moved into a new office. The staff included 9 employees. The automotive portal – Drive.md was launched.

=== 2004 ===
Simpals created a social networking platform Yes.md, which became some kind of symbiosis between online games and modern social networks. Forum.md became the Internet Project of the Year in Moldova and received the award with the same title during the International Youth Day, celebrated in Chişinău.

=== 2005 ===
On March 23, Simpals moved into a new office. The number of employees increased to 48 people. The daily chat was launched on Yes.md. As part of the (in Romanian) "Tineretul în acţiune" (Youth in action) program, Yes.md website received the title of the Internet project of the year in Moldova.

=== 2006 ===
On April 1, 2006 the company launched the Point.md platform – an information resource in Moldova. The portal was the official partner of Yandex Company in its regional program.

=== 2007 ===
Simpals launched Play.md – the first online television in Moldova. The portal broadcast both own news materials made by a team of professional journalists and alternative video versions of the events filmed and posted by the users of the portal. Simpals finalized the platform Colegi.md. The portal became a Moldovan social network.

=== 2008 ===
In 2008, Simpals began to work on the production of the first Moldovan 3D animated film (in Romanian) "Ţiganul" (The Gipsy). Simpals created the PointMessenger 2.0 software, which synchronized all services of the company’s interactive sites. The software was an analogue of ICQ. On December 21, 2008 Simpals moved into a new office. The number of employees reached 62 people.

=== 2009 ===
In 2009, Simpals launched the "999" online shop, which allowed Moldovan Internet users to shop online. The online map of Moldova point.md/Map was updated. The new map was created together with "INGEOCAD"- the State Institute of Geodesy, Engineering Research and Cadastre. Simpals added the dynamic map – point.md/Map to the Point.md portal, so that the internet users could freely access the most detailed map of Moldova. Simpals worked on the music video for the song (in Romanian) "Hora din Moldova" performed by Nelly Ciobanu, who represented Moldova at Eurovision – 2009. Simpals animation studio produced 3 short 3D animated films, two of them being dedicated to New Year, and the third one- – April Fool’s Day.

=== 2010 ===
Simpals moved into a new office. The number of employees reached 71 people. In 2010, Simpals opened "The School of Monsters" (MONSTERS.MD – the school of animation and computer graphics). Simpals opened a representative office of the International Mafia Game Club (MAFIA.MD).

=== 2011 ===
In 2011, Simpals launched the real estate agency – Imobil.md . Simpals launched the first venture incubator of startups in Moldova – "Simpals Garage". The "Simpals Garage" startup incubator became a co-organizer of the "Startup Weekend Moldova". Simpals launched Numbers.md – the first internet sales house in Moldova.

=== 2012 ===
Simpals launched a unified login system SimpalslD for all Simpals websites The social project "StopHam Moldova" began its activity. The company launched Point Money Mobile Currency Converter for IOS devices. Simpals launched a new section on the first Moldovan video-hosting site play.md - "Video Channels". 999.md won the gold award at the contest "Trademark of the Year" in the category "Favorite".

=== 2013 ===
In 2013, Simpals opened a sports portal and, under the auspices of the business incubator "Simpals Garage", the portal "marry.md". The animated film "Dji. Death fails" produced by Simpals Animation Studio won awards at various film festivals. The Point Money mobile application was adapted for Android operating system. 999.md won the silver award at the contest "Trademark of the Year" in the category "Favorite". The company launched Point Map mobile application for Android devices. Simpals launched the 999.md mobile app for IOS and Android devices.

=== 2015 ===
Simpals launched an online price comparison service 999 Market aimed at promoting Moldovan producers. Simpals launched Play Live, a mobile app for online streaming. The animated films "Dji. Death fails" and " Dji. Death sails" produced by Simpals Animation Studio " received awards at animation festivals and got more than 1 million views each on the popular video-hosting website youtube.com.

=== 2016 ===
999.md, expanded to Transnistria. Sporter.md launches the first online platform for manufacturers and sportswear, Sporter Market. Point Map cartographers have added detailed maps for all the district centers in the Republic of Moldova. Point.md portal launches the map navigation system.

=== 2017 ===
Simpals company launched a new project, in collaborative development with the government - Achizitii.md. This is an online platform for all tenders in the country, for commercial agents, both public and private.

Simpals company launched a new project - Verde.md, with the aim of restoring the green spaces that have suffered from the weather. With city residents' participation, in the first planting stage held in autumn, over 400 trees were planted in Chisinau.

1 July, Afisha project in cooperation with 999.md as well as other co-organizers in the person of MS-Prod and Media Show Grup, held the third edition of the electronic music festival in Moldova, FOSFOR, which set a new record in event attendance, having gathered 24,000 spectators.

Under the auspices of 999.md project, 999 Master is launched – a referral specialist service.

=== 2018 ===
Simpals company has become a resident of the first IT park in Moldova. Dmitrii Volosin is decorated with state distinction for contribution to the development of sport - the Civic Merit. In April sports organization Sporter organized for the first time the Music and Sport Festival Hai Haiduci! In September, the sports organization Sporter organizes for the first time in Moldova a marathon with a number of 18,000 participants. In November, Simpals is set up in a new office.

=== 2019 ===
Afisha.md project launched the tickets delivery system throughout the whole country. In May, Simpals SRL became one of the founders of the Association of Electronic Industry Companies (ACEM).Map.md project started adding 3D objects on the Moldova map.

In fall, Simpals launched a new project: Studii.md. It is an online system of students’ agendas and gradebooks. During the first few months, the project was implemented in 15 schools of Moldova.

In addition, Garage, the company's development department, announced the beginning of work on the new product: Sonr.pro - the smallest underwater communicator for coaches and divers, which aimed to improve the training sessions. This product was included in the list of 7 projects selected by the Starta Accelerator (Starta Ventures Group) (New York, USA).

The most popular Moldovan online ads board, 999.md, celebrated 20 years of working on the market. Monthly, over 2 millions of users find and offer products and services on 999.md.The 999 application for Android OS was ranked on the second place among the free Moldovan apps. Verde.md project planted over 2,000 trees and bushes during this year.

In December, Simpals was successfully certified to the ISO 9001: 2015 and 27001: 2008 standards.

=== 2020 ===
In January, ARIPI, the animated movie created by Simpals Studio, finished its festival period, and later was made available to the public.

In connection with the events associated with COVID-19 pandemic and the switching of schools of the Republic of Moldova to distance learning, the Studii.md project started expanding opportunities by transforming the platform of electronic diaries and grade books into a complete system for distance learning. As a result, Studii.md entered the list of platforms that are recommended for distance learning by the Ministry of Education, Culture and Research of the Republic of Moldova. By the end of 2020, 111 schools were connected to the platform.

Simpals joined the new advisory committee of the ATIC Association dedicated to discussing and resolving issues in the financial sector in Moldova.

During the quarantine period in Moldova, the 999.md project joined the national initiative #staiacasa and supported local producers and farmers by giving them the ability to post ads for free on the website. In addition, the project helped doctors find free housing next to work, and helped people exchange services for free in the "Mutual Aid in Quarantine" category. Together with Joblist, 999.md created a free urgent search service for employees during quarantine.

The Garage project helped the non-profit initiative group Visors produce visors (protective masks for doctors). The Sporter project, supported by volunteers, transformed snorkeling masks into protective masks for doctors.

In July, the Simpals company launched a service for the exchange and storage of electronic documents — ID.md.

With the support of UNICEF, USAID and WHO, the women’s forum mama.md and the non-governmental organization Forum released a broadcast in real time — "aLIVE", in which experts answer questions from the audience.

The Map.md and 999.md projects joined the national tourism relaunch campaign #Neampornit #Protejați. A new category appeared on the map, which includes the main tourist attractions in Moldova with an option to add new places to the map. A special subcategory was added to 999.md dedicated to the promotion of domestic tourism.

The Indoor Mapping feature appeared on the Map.md map. In September, Garage announced the launch of a new startup, Aheel — a device for runners that can teach them to run safely and without trauma. In September, Stiri.md became the most read news resource in Romanian, according to data provided by Gemius.

In 2020, the cartoon “Aripi” entered the Forbes TOP-50 VR debuts of 2019, participated in 28 festivals and won 9 awards. It also became the first Moldovan cartoon to be released on the Steam platform. Simpals Studio released a series of social sketches treating environmental issues — “The Ocean”, “The Harvest”, “The Flat”. “The Flat” participated in 36 festivals and won 2 awards. The Studio was also engaged in the production of a social video about children with Down syndrome.

== Projects ==
- 999.md
- pay.md
- point.md
- stiri.md
- map.md
- votum.md
- profi.md
- forum.md
- tigan.md
- simpals.studio
- monsters.md
- garage.md
- lobsterweight.com
- aheel.run
- sonr.pro
- numbers.md
- play.md
- drive.md
- mafia.md
- joblist.md
- colegi.md
- mama.md
- imobil.md
- sporter.md
- ftrm.md
- marathon.md
- seamile.md
- winerun.md
- criterium.md
- freediving.md
- craciun.md
- hellrun.md
- puzzleday.md
- glodiator.md
- haiduc.md
- rubicon.run
- triumph.md
- chisinau.me
- verde.md
- afisha.md
- fosfor.md
- price.md
- achizitii.md
- id.md
- joblist.md
- studii.md
- banzai.md
- gsm.md
- point IM
- 999 market
- smsmarket.md
- yes.md

== Filmography ==
2009

- Baro and Tagar
- Gypsy and Death

2010

- Santa and Death

2012

- Dji. Death fails

2014

- Dji. Death sails

2019

- ARIPI

2020

- The Ocean
- The Harvest
- The Flat

== Awards and distinctions ==
Year	Nominated work	Award	Category	Result
2013	Dji. Death fails	Budapest Short Film Festival	Animation	Won
2013	Dji. Death fails	Filmsshort	Online competition	Grand Winner
2013	Dji. Death fails	Shortini Film Festival	Film	Won
2013	Dji. Death fails	Opuzen Film Festival	Animated Film	Won
2013	Dji. Death fails	International Short Film Festival KOROCHE	Animated Film	Won
2013	Dji. Death fails	SHORTS Film Festival	Animation	Won
2013	Dji. Death fails	Thess International Short Film Festival	Cinematic Achievement Award	Won
2013	Dji. Death fails	FreeNetWorld International Film Fest	Audience Award	Won
2013	Dji. Death fails	Film Festival Cinema Under The Stars	Animation Film	Won
2013	Dji. Death fails	KROK International Animation Festival 2013	Tragicomedy in 3D	Diploma
2013	Dji. Death fails	Libelula Animation Festival	Animated Film	Special Mention
2013	Dji. Death fails	Nevada International Film Festival	Comedy	Won
2014	Dji. Death fails	Dieciminuti Film Festival	Animation	Won
2014	Dji. Death fails	ClujShorts	Animation	Won
2014	Dji. Death fails	Riverside Short Film & Video Festival	Audience Award	Won
2014	Dji. Death fails	Prokuplje Short Film Festival	Animation	Won
2014	Dji. Death fails	FIFES 2014	Animated Film	Won
2014	Dji. Death fails	Sorsi Corti International Short Film Festival	Animation	Won
2014	Dji. Death fails	MisCon International Short Film Festival	Fantasy Film	Fan Favorite
2014	Dji. Death fails	Neum Animated Film Festival	Music	Won
2014	Dji. Death fails	Festival du Film Merveilleux et Imaginaire	Animated Movie	Won
2014	Dji. Death fails	Tri-Cities International Fantastic Film Festival	Animation	Won
2014	Dji. Death fails	ON THE ROAD Online Film Festival	Animation	Won
2014	Dji. Death fails	Premio Cinematografico Palena	Animated Film	Special Mention
2014	Dji. Death fails	Corti a Ponte	Animated Film	Special Mention
2014	Dji. Death fails	VOTD.tv	Online competition	Video of the Day
2015	Dji.Death Sails	FIFES	Animated Film	Won
2015	Dji.Death Sails	New Horizon	Comedy	Won
2015	Dji.Death Sails	MisCon 29 International Short Film Festival	Fantasy Film	Won
2015	Dji.Death Sails	Bangalore Shorts Film Festival	Animated Film	Special Mention
2015	Dji.Death Sails	Neum Animated Film Festival	3D Animation	Won
2015	Dji.Death Sails	Best Shorts Competition	Award of Excellence	Won
2015	Dji.Death Sails	Short of the Year- Spring 2015	Animated Film	Special Mention
2015	Dji.Death Sails	Koroche	Foreign Film	Won
2015	Dji.Death Sails	ASI Viewer's Choice Awards	Independent Professional Films category	Won
2015	Dji.Death Sails	Modix Festival	Animated Film	Special Mention
2015	Dji.Death Sails	Linoleum Film Festival	Animated Film	Special Jury Mention
2015	Dji.Death Sails	Animaevka	3D Animation	Won
2015	Dji.Death Sails	ANIMA2015 – VIII Córdoba International Animation Festival	ANIMATION FOR CHILDREN	Won
2015	Dji.Death Sails	Firenze Short Film Festival	Animation	Won
2015	Dji.Death Sails	Videnie	Animation	Won
2015	Dji.Death Sails	Tofuzi	Film for Children	Won
2015	Dji.Death Sails	Atlanta Shorts Fest	Animated Short	Won
2015	Dji.Death Sails	Videomedeja	Animated Film	Special Mention
2016	Dji.Death Sails	ШОРТЫ	Animation	Won
2015	Dji.Death Sails	Nevada International Film Festival	Animation	Won
2015	Dji.Death Sails	FAAF	Animated Film	Audience Award
2016	Dji.Death Sails	International Animday Awards	Animated Film	Jury's Choice
2016	Dji.Death Sails	Love Your Shorts Film Festival	Animation	Won
2016	Dji.Death Sails	Cinema Under the Stars	Animation category	1st Place
2016	Dji.Death Sails	Monstra Animated Film Festival	Family Program category	Audience Award
2016	Dji.Death Sails	Ciné-Jeune de l'Aisne	Short Animated Film	Won
2016	Dji.Death Sails	Golden Orchid International Animation Festival	Animated Short Film	Won
2016	Dji.Death Sails	Festival International UN Pays UN Film	Animated Film	Public Award
2016	Dji.Death Sails	Reel Shorts Film Festival in Grande Prairie	Animated Film	The Youth Audience Choice Award
2019	ARIPI	Best Shorts Competition	Animated Film	The Award of Exсellence
2019	ARIPI	Neum Animated Film Festival	Animation	Grand Prix
2019	ARIPI	Neum Animated Film Festival	Animation	Best 3D Animation
2019	ARIPI	Festival du Film Merveilleux et Imaginaire	Animation	Best Animation
2019	ARIPI	International Independent Film Awards	Animated Film	Platinum Winner
2019	ARIPI	Vancouver International Film Festival	VR	Veer Audience Award
2019	ARIPI	RAVAC International Film Festival	Animated Film	Audience Award
2019	ARIPI	RAVAC International Film Festival	Animated Film	Best Music
2019	ARIPI	RAVAC International Film Festival	Animated Film	Best Sound
2019	ARIPI	LUSCA Fantastic Film Fest	VR	Best VR Project
2019	ARIPI	Delhi Shorts International Film Festival	Animated Film	Certificate of Exсellence
2019	ARIPI	Baltimore Next Media Web Fest	VR	Best VR Project
2019	ARIPI	Austin Indie Fest	VR	Best VR Project
2019	ARIPI	VR AWARDS	VR	Finalist
2019	ARIPI	Palm Beach International Mini Movie and Film Festival	VR	Best Animated VR Project
2020	ARIPI	Gala Cineaștilor 2020	Animated Film	Best Soundtrack/Best Original Music
2020	ARIPI	Canterbury film festival	Animated Film	Best International Film
2020	ARIPI	Canterbury film festival	Animated Film	Best Animation
2020	ARIPI	Short Sweet Film Fest	VR	Outstanding Virtual Reality Film
2020	ARIPI	Lichter VR Storytelling Award	VR	Best VR Animation
2020	ARIPI	Rofife Film Festival	Animation	2nd Prize
2020	ARIPI	Gassli Film Festival	VR	Innovative Storytelling Award
2020	ARIPI	Khem Animation Film Festival	Animation	Best 3D Film
2020	ARIPI	Kyiv International Film Festival	Animation	Best Animated Film
2020	The Flat	Florida Animation Festival	Animation Category	1st Place
2020	The Flat	Artkino	Animated Film	Honorable Diploma

== Social activities ==
- (in Russian)"Мальчикам и девочкам посвящается" (Dedicated to the boys and girls) – a social project developed by Simpals to help orphans from Moldovan orphanages. (2006, 2007, 2011).
- (in Russian)"Wерни Wетеранам Wеру " (Give Faith to Veterans) – a social project for veterans developed by Simpals in partnership with (in Russian)Forum.md portal. The projects exists since 2005.
- The social project "StopHam Moldova" in partnership with forum.md exists since 2012 with the consent from the organizers of the Russian StopXam movement.
- * Chisinau Is Me project aims to transform turban architecture into independent urban art.
- Verde.md project aims to renew the green spaces of Chisinau and Moldova.

== Educational activities ==
- "School of Monsters" – the school of animation and computer graphics. (MONSTERS.MD).
