= Kyiv Marathon =

Annual race in Ukraine held since 2010

- Kyiv Marathon logo
- Date: October
- Location: Kyiv, Ukraine
- Event type: Road
- Distance: Marathon, Half marathon, 10K run, 5K run
- Primary sponsor: Wizz Air
- Established: 2010 (16 years ago)
- Organizer: Run Ukraine Running League
- Course records: Men's: 2:19:17 (2013) (Ukraine) Andriy Naumov; Women's: 2:44:41 (2013) (Ukraine) Tetiana Rybalchenko
- Website: Kyiv Marathon
- Participants: 1,232 finishers (2021); 1,905 finishers (2019)

The Kyiv Marathon or Wizz Air Kyiv City Marathon is an annual road running event over the marathon distance which is held in October on the streets of Kyiv, Ukraine since 2010. The race is certified by AIMS, and is part of the Run Ukraine Running League, an annual series of races held in Ukrainian cities.

== History ==
In 2010 Kyiv joined the list of cities that hold their own annual marathon. October 16, 2010 Kyiv held its first marathon, attended by 546 participants from 13 countries – 144 athletes volunteered to go to the start of the classic marathon, which is 42 km 195 m. Volodymyr Horban from Kyiv and Liudmyla Shelest from Sumy became the winners.

The second marathon in 2011 was attended by more than 1,000 runners. 1,693 participants registered in 2013, and in the spring of 2014, nearly 3,500 athletes from 32 countries started. In 2015 3,800 participants from 38 countries came to the starting line. The marathon route became the special feature of this race since it was mapped as one lap through the city. More than 6600 athletes and amateurs from 50 countries started in 2016.

In 2017, a man died from participating in the event.

The 2020 in-person edition of the race was canceled due to the coronavirus pandemic, with all registrants given the option of transferring their entry to 2021 or 2022, or receiving credit of equivalent value for other races.

On 3 March 2022, a week after Russia invaded Ukraine with help from Belarus, Run Ukraine banned Russian and Belarusian runners from all its events, and stated that the runners' registration fees would be used to restore Ukraine. On 19 July, about five months into the invasion, Run Ukraine announced that the marathon was postponed indefinitely.

== Course ==
External images
- Course map of full marathon in 2018
- Course map of full marathon in 2019

The marathon runs on a loop course that begins and ends on Volodymyrs'kyi Passage near the Bohdan Khmelnytsky Monument and Sofia Square.

The course first heads south on Volodymyrska Street and turns west on Taras Shevchenko Boulevard to arrive at Victory Square. Runners then head southeast to the Olimpiyskiy National Sports Complex and then north up Khreshchatyk Street to Maidan Nezalezhnosti. The marathon then heads southeast to the Motherland Monument and crosses the Paton Bridge into the Dniprovskyi District before turning around at Yevhen Sverstyuk Street and returning across the bridge to arrive at the halfway point.

Runners then run northwest along the Dnipro River and cross the pedestrian Park Bridge into Trukhaniv Island. The course runs northward through the greenery, and then leaves the island via Pivnichnyi Bridge. The marathon then runs along the Dnipro through Rybalskyi Peninsula via Naberezhno-Rybalska Street before crossing the Harbour Bridge. Runners then run through the Podil neighbourhood and climb up Hlybochytska and Sichovykh Striltsiv Streets before returning to Volodymyrs'kyi Passage for the finish.

== Winners ==
Key: Course record

=== Marathon ===
Ed.	Year	Men's winner	Time	Women's winner	Time	Ref.
	2022	Cancelled due to the Russian invasion of Ukraine				
11	2021	Artem Piddubnyi (UKR)	2:30:43	Tatiana Vilisova (RUS)	2:48:24	
	2020	Cancelled due to the COVID-19 pandemic				
10	2019	Oleksandr Babarynka (UKR)	2:28:57	Nataliia Semenovych (UKR)	2:51:38	
9	2018	Artem Piddubnyi (UKR)	2:28:29	Yuliia Tarasova (UKR)	2:48:09	
8	2017	Artem Piddubnyi (UKR)	2:24:17	Iryna Masnyk (UKR)	2:48:09	
7	2016	Oleh Leshchyshyn (UKR)	2:31:10	Yuliia Bairamova (UKR)	3:01:11	
6	2015	Yevhen Hlyva (UKR)	2:32:39	Yana Kulykova (UKR)	3:33:27	
5	2014	Dmytro Pozhevilov (UKR)	2:30:21	Olha Dehtiarenko (UKR)	3:00:00	
4	2013	Andriy Naumov (UKR)	2:19:17	Tetiana Rybalchenko (UKR)	2:44:41	
3	2012	Viktor Starodubtsev (UKR)	2:25:27	Liudmyla Shelest (UKR)	3:15:34	
2	2011	Volodymyr Horban (UKR)	2:27:26	Tetiana Ivanova (UKR)	2:46:39	
1	2010	Volodymyr Horban (UKR)	2:26:36	Liudmyla Shelest (UKR)	3:09:16	

=== Half marathon ===
Ed.	Year	Men's winner	Time	Women's winner	Time	Rf.
11	2021	Ihor Russ (UKR)	1:10:14	Liliia Baranovska (UKR)	1:27:58	
	2020	cancelled due to coronavirus pandemic				
10	2019	Oleksandr Sitkovskyi (UKR)	1:05:38	Kateryna Karmanenko (UKR)	1:25:36	
9	2018	Serhii Marchuk (UKR)	1:11:32	Yuliia Tarasevich (BLR)	1:21:50	
8	2017	Vitalii Ivakh (UKR)	1:11:37	Yuliya Tarasevich (BLR)	1:26:04	
7	2016	Serhii Marchuk (UKR)	1:14:30	Olha Dehtiarenko (UKR)	1:31:54	

=== 10 km ===
Ed.	Year	Men's winner	Time	Women's winner	Time	Rf.
11	2021	Ivan Ivanov (UKR)	34:16	Marianna Shevchenko (UKR)	41:40	
	2020	cancelled due to coronavirus pandemic				
10	2019	Ivan Strebkov (UKR)	30:10	Tetiana Solianyk (UKR)	40:05	
9	2018	Mykhailo Bohdanov (UKR)	33:03	Olha Mykuliak (UKR)	47:47	
8	2017	Oleksandr Karpenko (UKR)	32:39	Liudmyla Danylyna (UKR)	36:16	
7	2016	Oleksandr Voloshchuk (UKR)	37:03	Snizhana Rybak (UKR)	40:58	
6	2015	Mykola Nyzhnyk (UKR)	31:44	Yuliia Moroz (UKR)	39:34	
