= Ghent Marathon =

Road running event in Ghent, Belgium

- Date: March
- Location: Ghent
- Event type: Road
- Distance: Marathon, Half marathon
- Primary sponsor: Sofico
- Established: 2017
- Website: Sofico Ghent Marathon
- Participants: 5,650 (2026)

The Ghent Marathon ('Sofico Gent Marathon' for sponsorship reasons) is an annual marathon in the city of Ghent, Belgium, organised since 2017 and held in March.

The 2026 edition saw 5,650 runners signing up for the marathon, making it the marathon with the second highest number of participants in Belgium, after the 2025 Brussels-Leuven European Championships marathon.

== Track ==
The start of the 42.195 km is at the rowing race course (Watersportbaan) of Ghent, while the finish is inside the Flanders Sports Arena.

== Distances ==
Apart from the marathon, a half marathon is also organised on the same day.

== Size ==
In total 18,000 runners participated in the 2026 edition, of which 5,650 ran the marathon.

== Past winners ==
Year	Winner (men)	Country	Time	Winner (women)	Country	Time
29 March 2026	Steven Verschuere	Belgium	2:19:46	Laurine Lepoutre	France	2:53:54

== See also ==
- List of marathon races in Europe
