= Helsingborg Marathon =

Marathon in Sweden

- Date: 5 September 2026
- Location: Helsingborg, Sweden
- Event type: road
- Distance: Marathon
- Established: 2014
- Website: www.helsingborgmarathon.se

The Helsingborg Marathon is planned to be an annual long-distance running event through much of Helsingborg. With a maximum limit of 2000 participants, the marathon race is expected to become the second largest marathon in Sweden, second to Stockholm Marathon, both in number of participants and number of elite runners. The start is at Sundstorget in the central city and the finish is at Gröningen, not far north of the start.

== History ==
The promoters, Andreas Gartmyr and Simon Wikstrand, started planning the race in 2012.

== General ==
The contestants must pass the midway control three hours after the start. The maximum time limit for Helsingborg Marathon is six hours. The participants (four in each team) run in the relay, alongside the marathon runners. The first relay runner will start one hour after the marathon runners. The minimum age for the marathon distance is 18, while age 15 is enough for the relay. Water stations are located regularly along the path. Some of these also offer energy drinks, bananas and oranges. Timing is done with an electronic disposable chip that is built into the bib number. The timer records the runner's net time, which means that the timing starts when the participant cross the starting line, and stops when the participant crosses the finish line. Sprinters who choose to abort the race are offered free taxi ride down to the finish area.

== The course ==
The course was born out of the idea of showing the fantastic views and spots in the beautiful city of Helsingborg. The race consists of one counter-clockwise lap around Helsingborg and spans 42,195 meters of winding roads, mostly asphalt. The starting area is located at Sundstorget, near Dunkers Cultural center in the heart of Helsingborg. The finish line is found about 500 meters north of the start, on Gröningen. But before that, the runners must pass three controls, where they may run through a portal in order to register their middle times. They also function as switching areas for the relay. They are located near Ättekulla Nature Reserve, Olympia Park and Pålsjö forest.

The first seven kilometers takes the runners along the sea and the harbor, overlooking Denmark on the right side. Once at the track's southernmost point, Råå minor harbor, the river Råån is crossed, before reaching the Ättekulla Nature Reserve, where the hiking path Landborgspromenaden begins. Fourteen kilometers into the race, the athletes reach Ramlösa brunnspark and shortly thereafter the natural area Jordbodalen. Halfway through the marathon, the participants continue through Fredriksdal Museums and Gardens. They then pass the football stadium Olympia, and then run through the Helsingborg arena. Thus, Helsingborg Marathon is the first marathon in Europe that goes indoors. A while later, the high fortress Kärnan appears. The next significant stop is Pålsjö castle, followed by a passage through Sofiero Castle gardens. The final five kilometers stretch along the road Strandvägen, past the beach Fria bad and finally along the boardwalk, parallel to Gröningen.

== Winners ==
Edition	Year	Men's winner	Time (h:m:s)	Women's winner	Time (h:m:s)
3rd	2016	Anders Dahlman (SWE)	2:34:21	Malin Holmberg (SWE)	3:03:29
2nd	2015	Henrik Orre (SWE)	2:33:13	Anna Bjurman (SWE)	3:10:10
1st	2014	Henrik Orre (SWE)	2:33:48	Karin Axelsson (SWE)	3:04:23
