= Växjö Marathon =

Annual race held in Växjö, Sweden

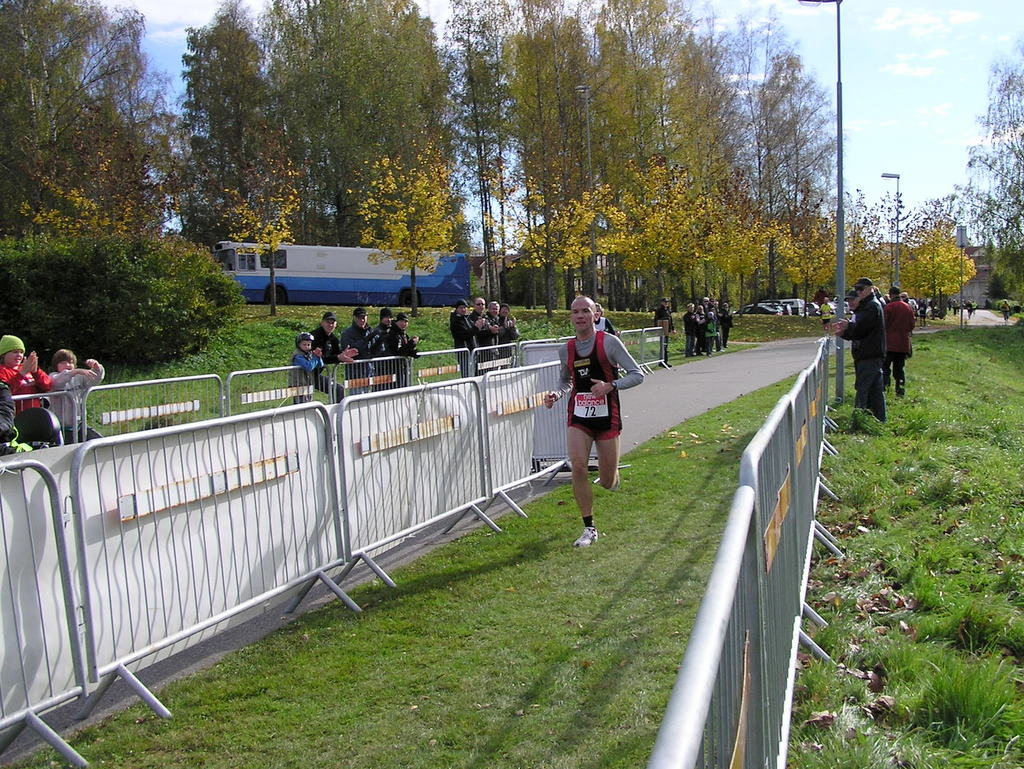
- Henrik Olsson wins the men's 2007 edition
- Status: active
- Genre: sporting event
- Date: October
- Frequency: annual
- Location: various
- Country: Sweden
- Inaugurated: 1994

Växjö Marathon is an annual marathon running competition in Växjö, Sweden, organized by the local athletics club Växjö Löparklubb. The race was first held in 1994.

The race is currently the second largest marathon in Sweden with 303 starting runners 2008. Eight laps is run around the Växjö Lake on a flat course with 85% asphalt and 15% dirt road. Thanks to the cool temperature in October when it takes place and the easy course, the race is considered fast. The current race records are 2:27:59, set in 1999, and 2:50:36, set in 2008, for men and women respectively.
