= Gran Canaria Marathon =

- Date: Third Sunday in January
- Location: Las Palmas de Gran Canaria
- Event type: Road running
- Distance: Marathon
- Primary sponsor: Cajasiete
- Course records: Men: 2:12:08 (Kenya) Julius Kiprono Tarus (2019); Women: 2:33:00 (Kenya) Shelmith Nyawira (2019)
- Website: Gran Canaria Maratón
- Participants: 879 (2019)

The Gran Canaria Maratón is an annual marathon and half-marathon running competition in Las Palmas de Gran Canaria, the largest city in Canary Islands (Spain), organized by the local Cabildo de (government of) Gran Canaria.

The race was first held in 2010, but the half marathon distance had been disputed eight times before.

The race takes place in January, with average temperatures of 20 °C (68 °F). The start and finish is in the same point. The course goes all over the city. The half marathoners run one lap, while the marathon race consists of two. The course is flat.

== List of winners ==
Edition	Year	Men's winner	Time (m:s)	Women's winner	Time (m:s)
1st	2010	James Kipkosgei (KEN)	2:17:40	Chatumoha Ture (ETH)	2:40:31
2nd	2011	Abraham Amare (ETH)	2:21:23	Eleni Gebremedhin (ETH)	2:40:30
3rd	2012	Daniel Wilkinson (USA)	2:28:18	Aroa Merino (ESP)	3:00:43
4th	2013	Doroteo Martínez (ESP)	2:35:32	Aroa Merino (ESP)	2:59:51
5th	2014	Eoin Flynn (IRE)	2:29:15	Philippa Taylor (GBR)	2:54:31
6th	2015	Pharis Kimani (KEN)	2:14:39	Shasho Insermu (ETH)	2:34:56
7th	2016	Julius Korir (KEN)	2:14:47	Elina Junnila (FIN)	2:57:48
8th	2017	Mathew Kipsaat (KEN)	2:13:19	Aroa Merino (ESP)	2:46:21
9th	2018	Moses Mbugua (KEN)	2:13:26	Betty Chepleting (KEN)	2:36:52
10th	2019	Julius Kiprono Tarus (KEN)	2:12:08	Shelmith Nyawira (KEN)	2:33:00

== Gallery ==
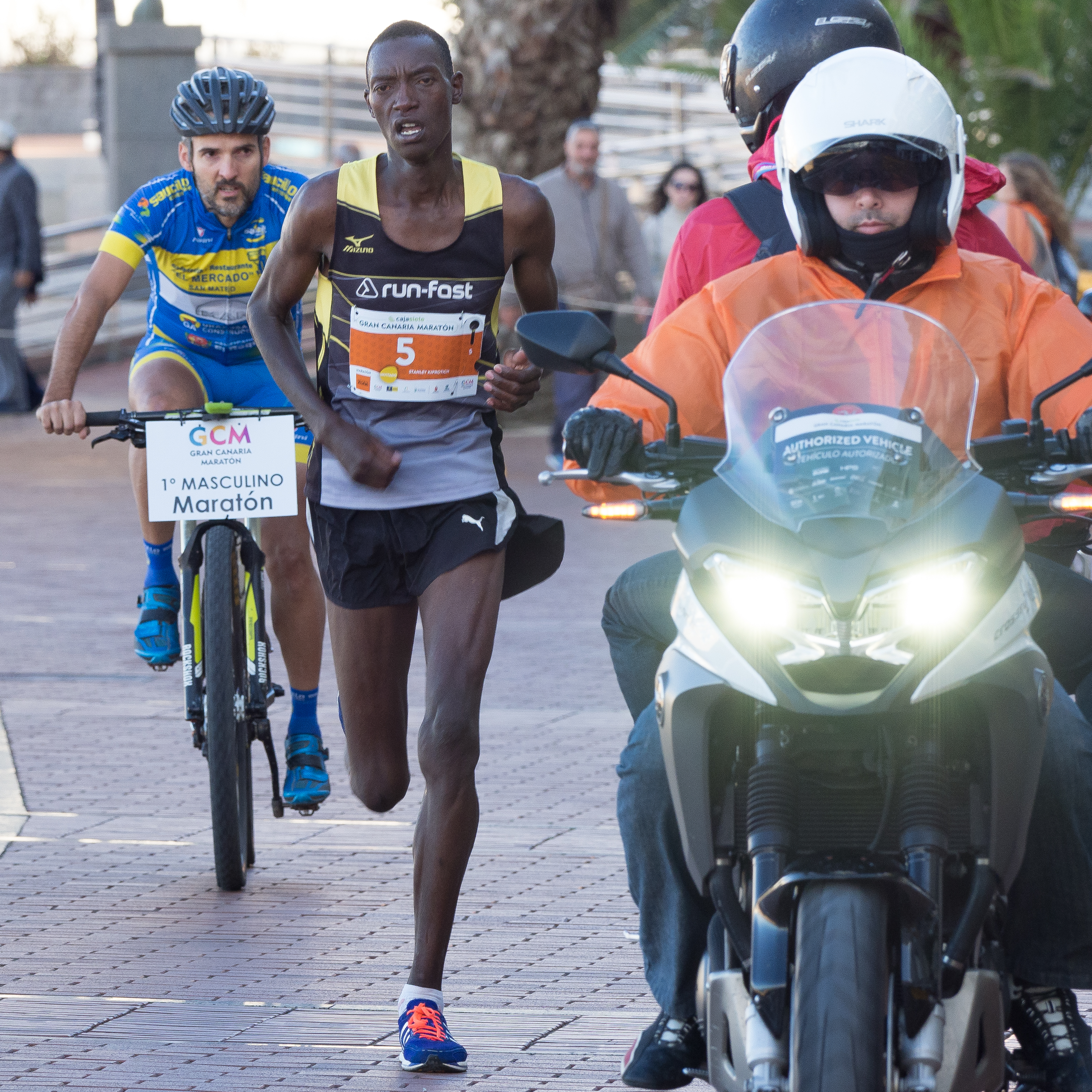
Gran Canaria Maraton 2017

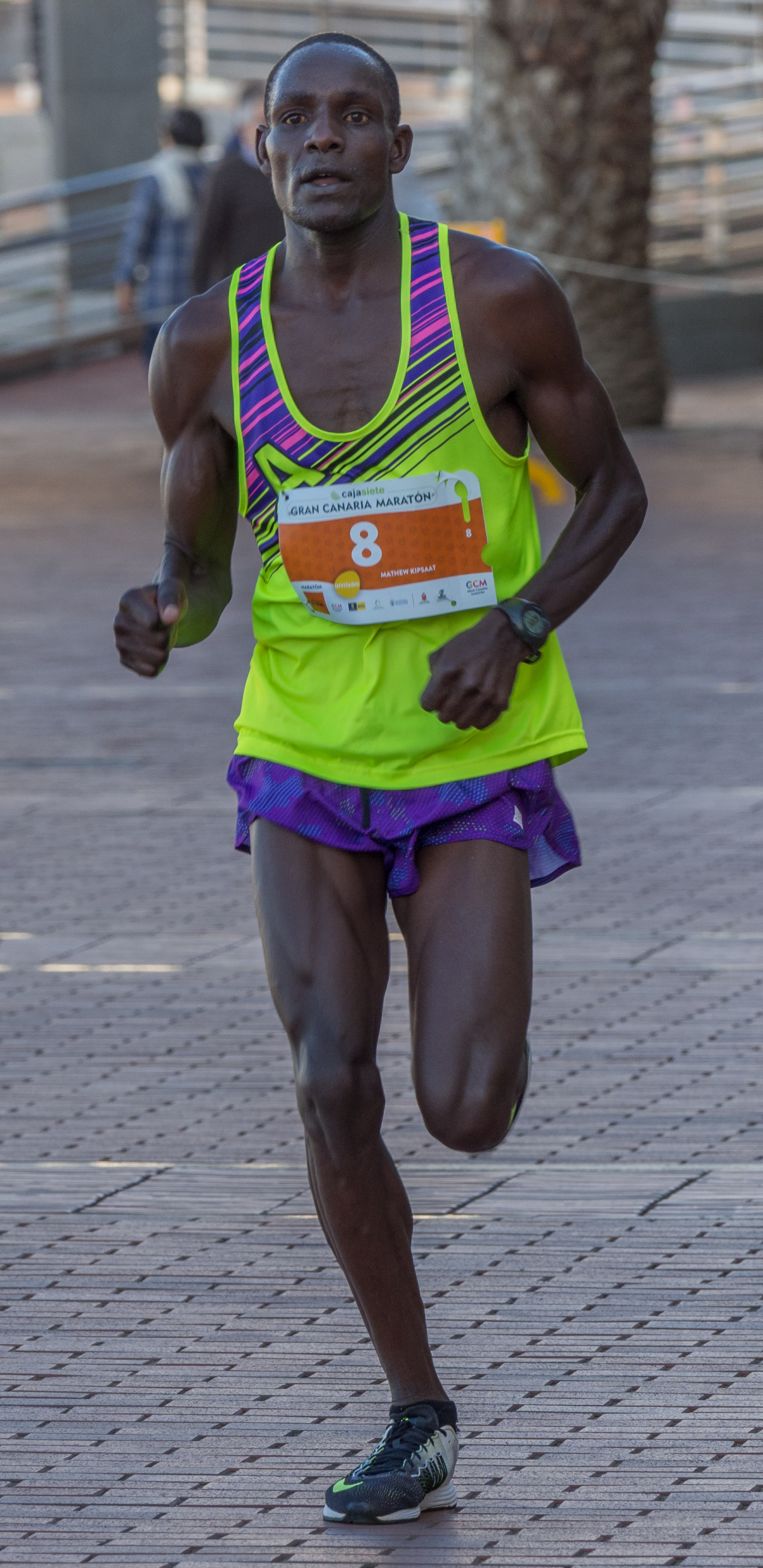
Gran Canaria Maraton 2017

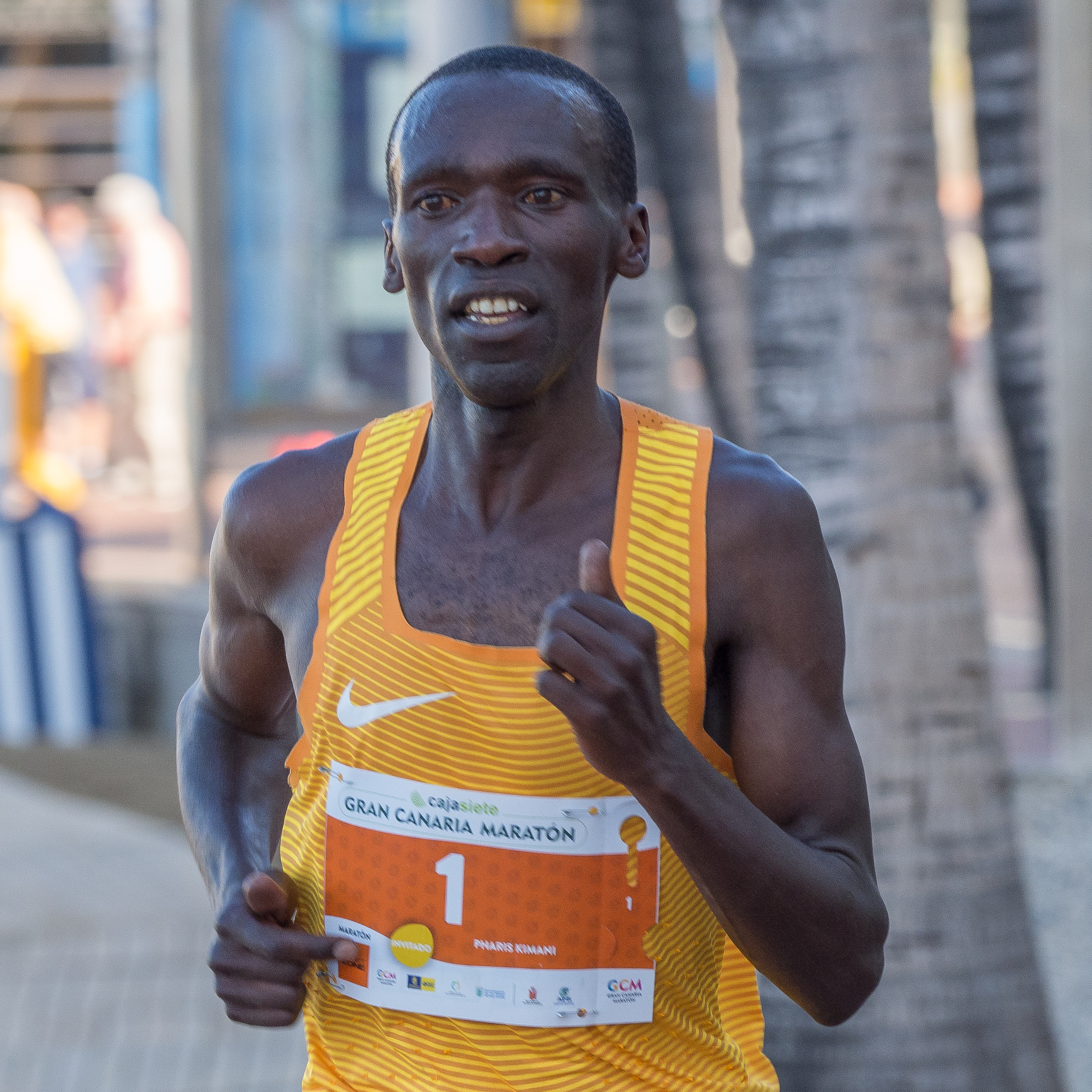
Gran Canaria Maraton 2017

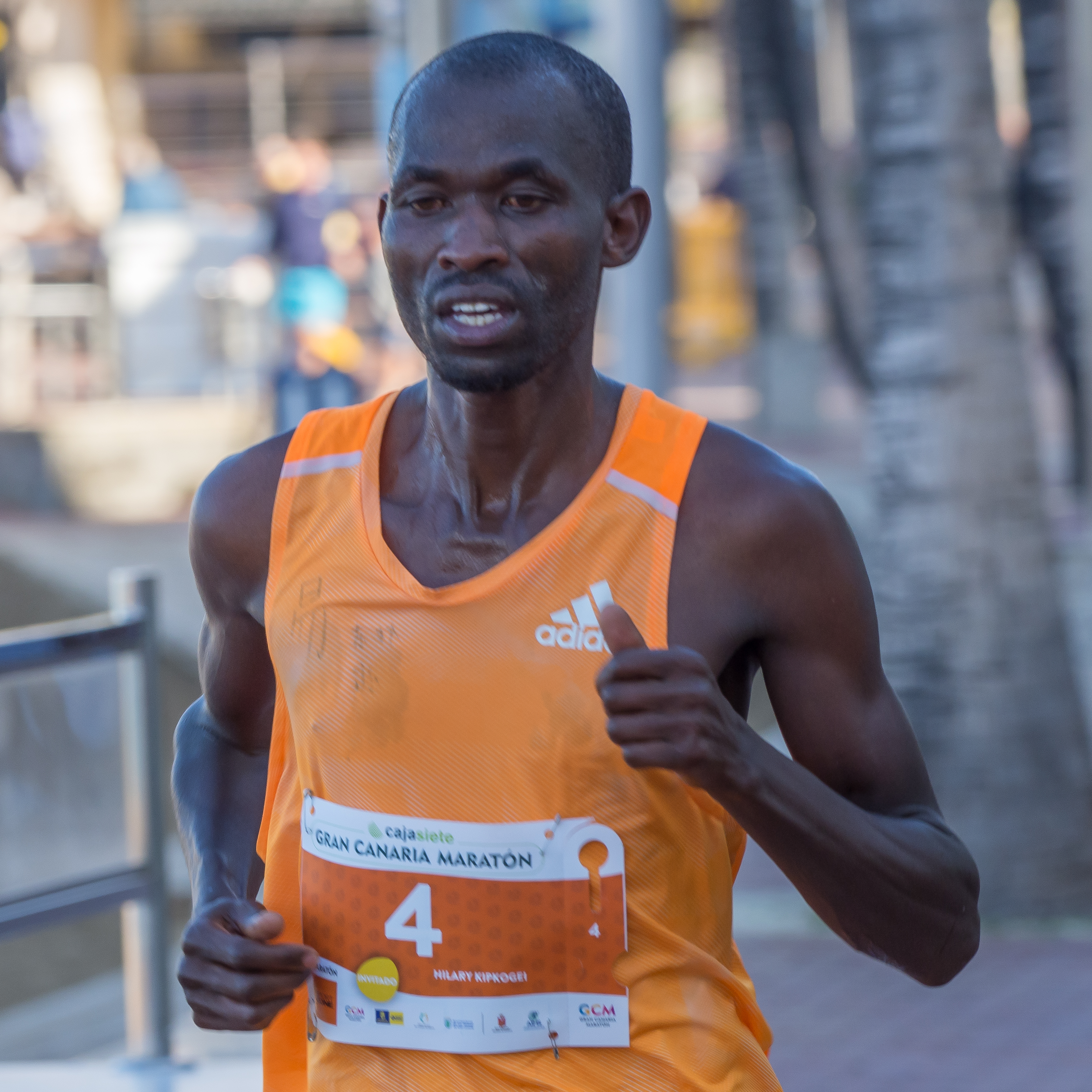
Gran Canaria Maraton 2017

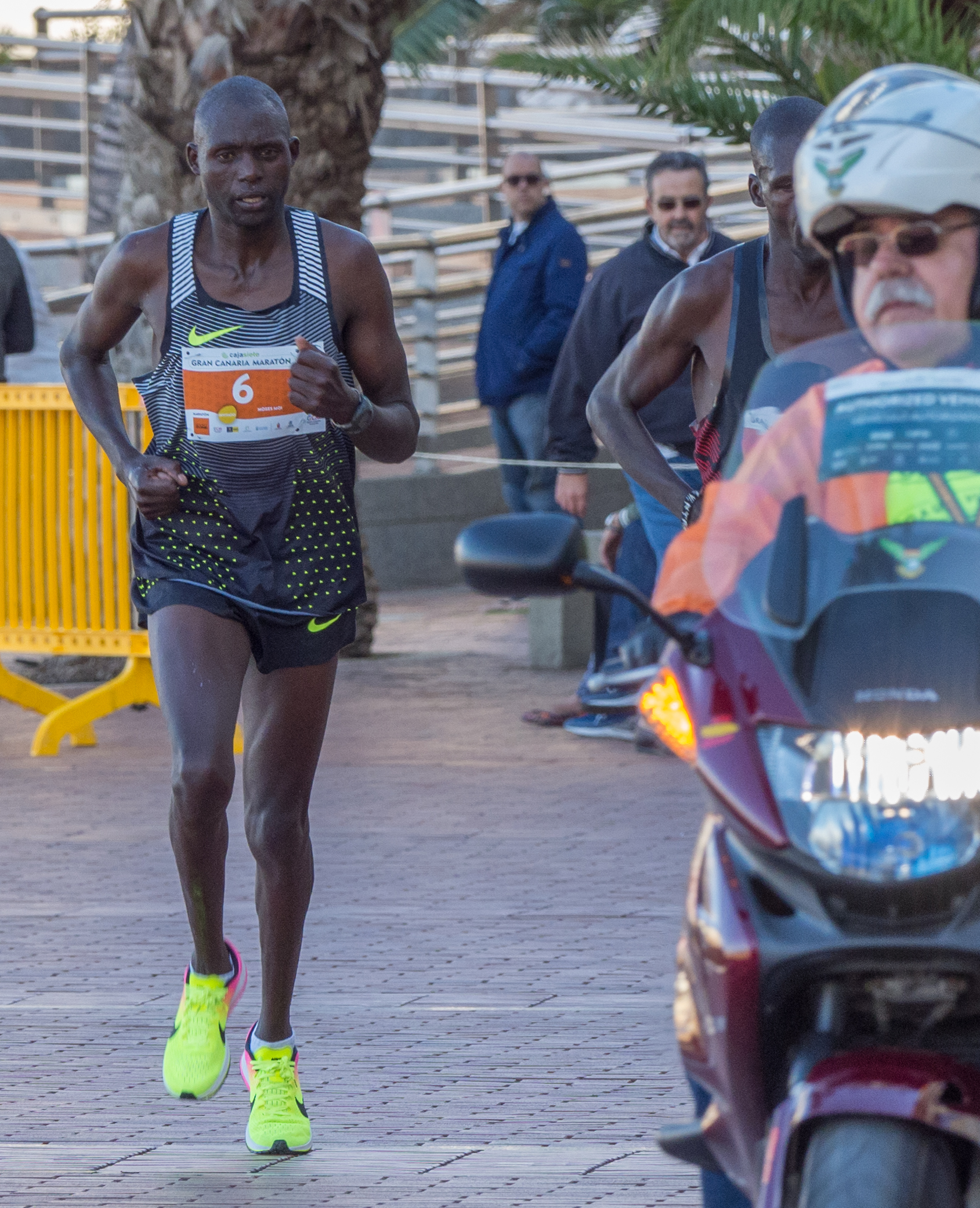
Gran Canaria Maraton 2017

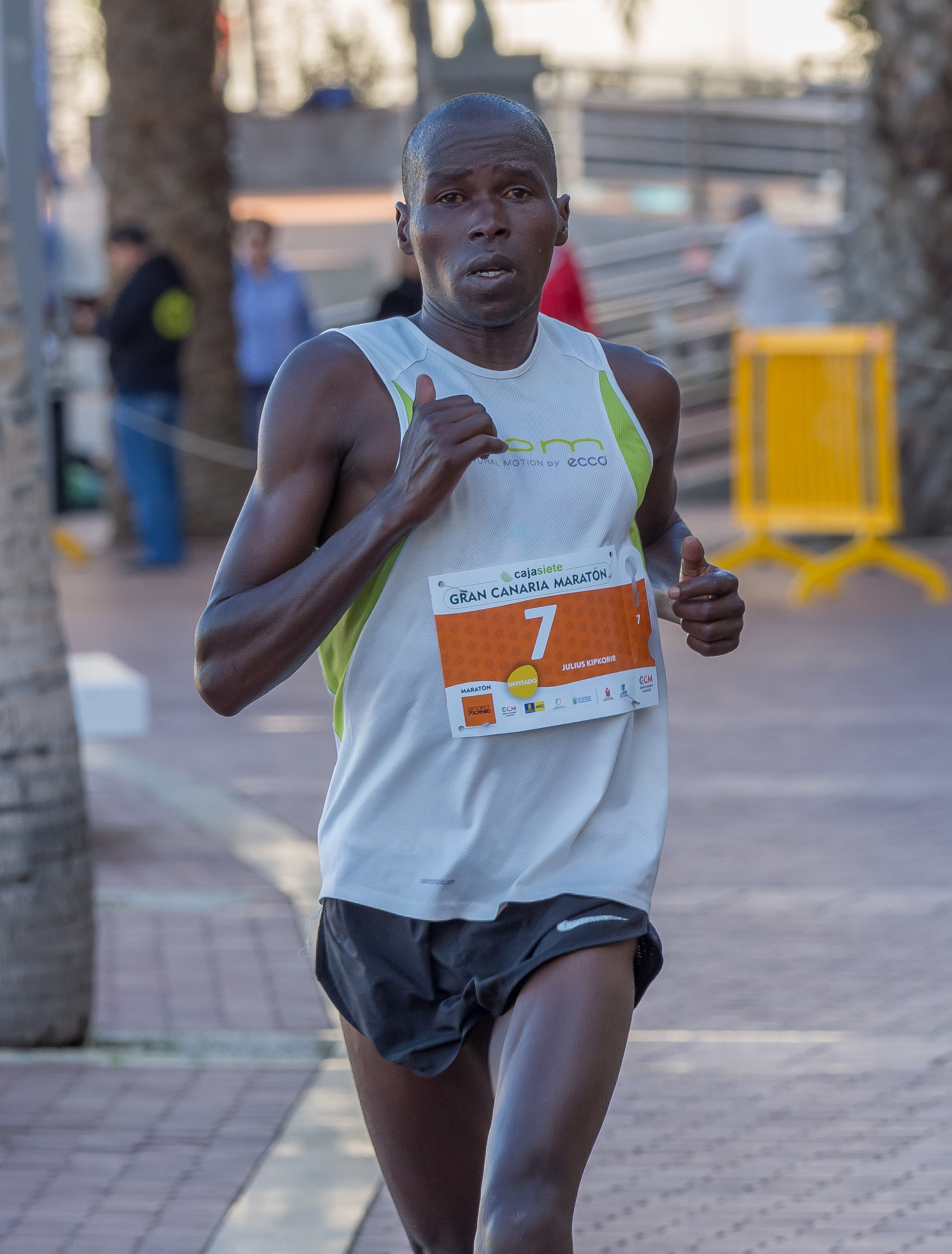
Gran Canaria Maraton 2017

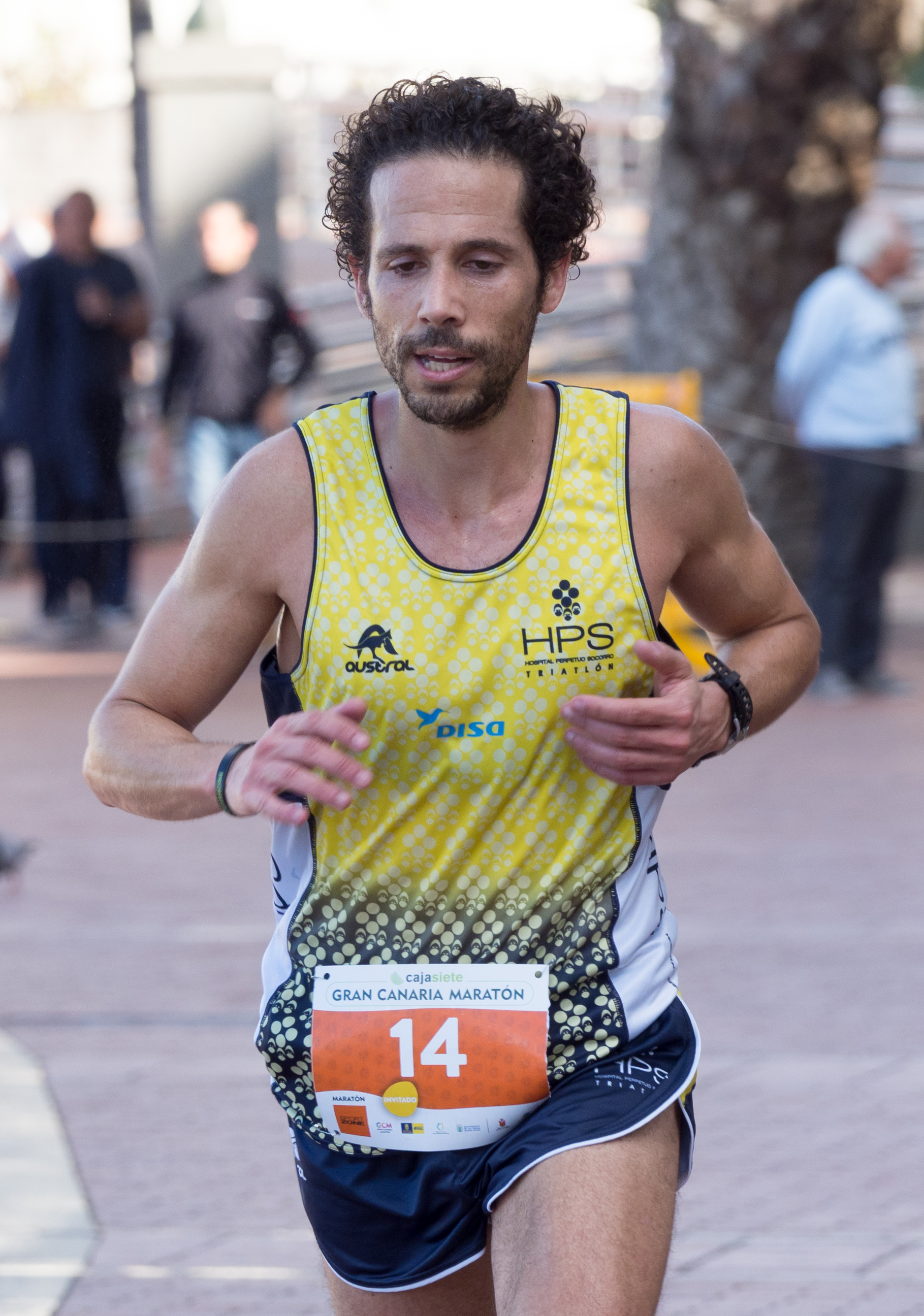
Gran Canaria Maraton 2017

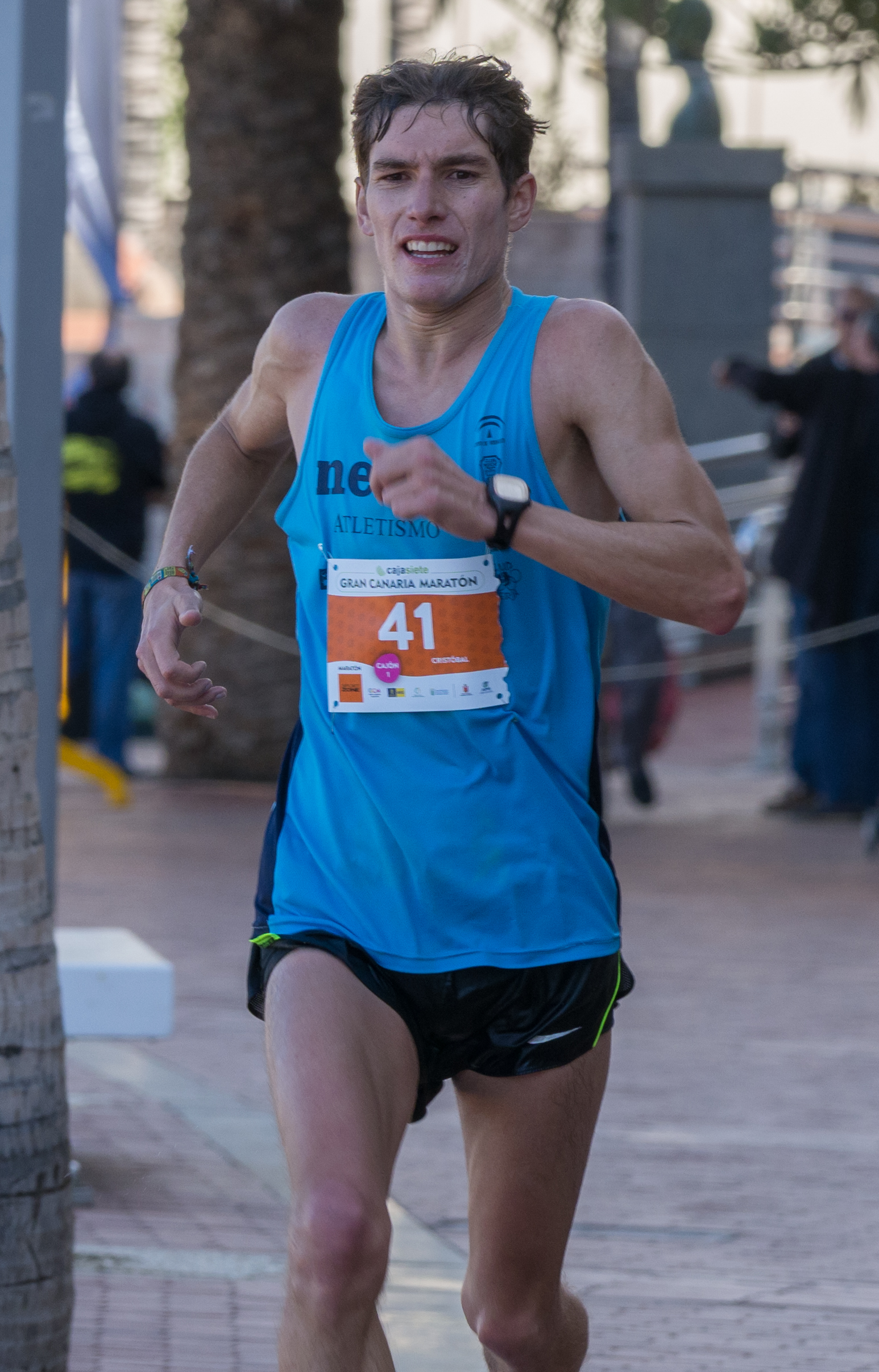
Gran Canaria Maraton 2017

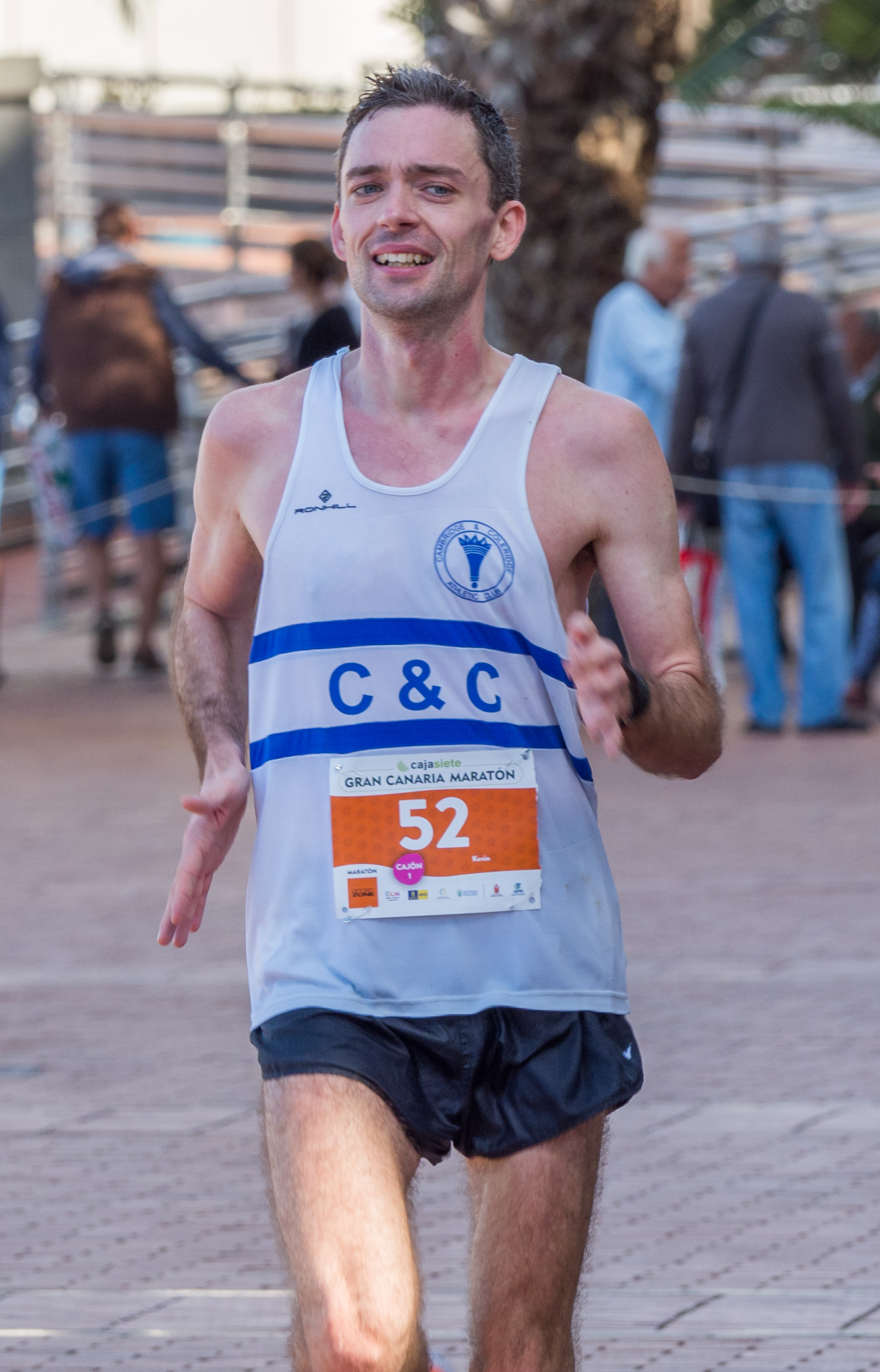
Gran Canaria Maraton 2017

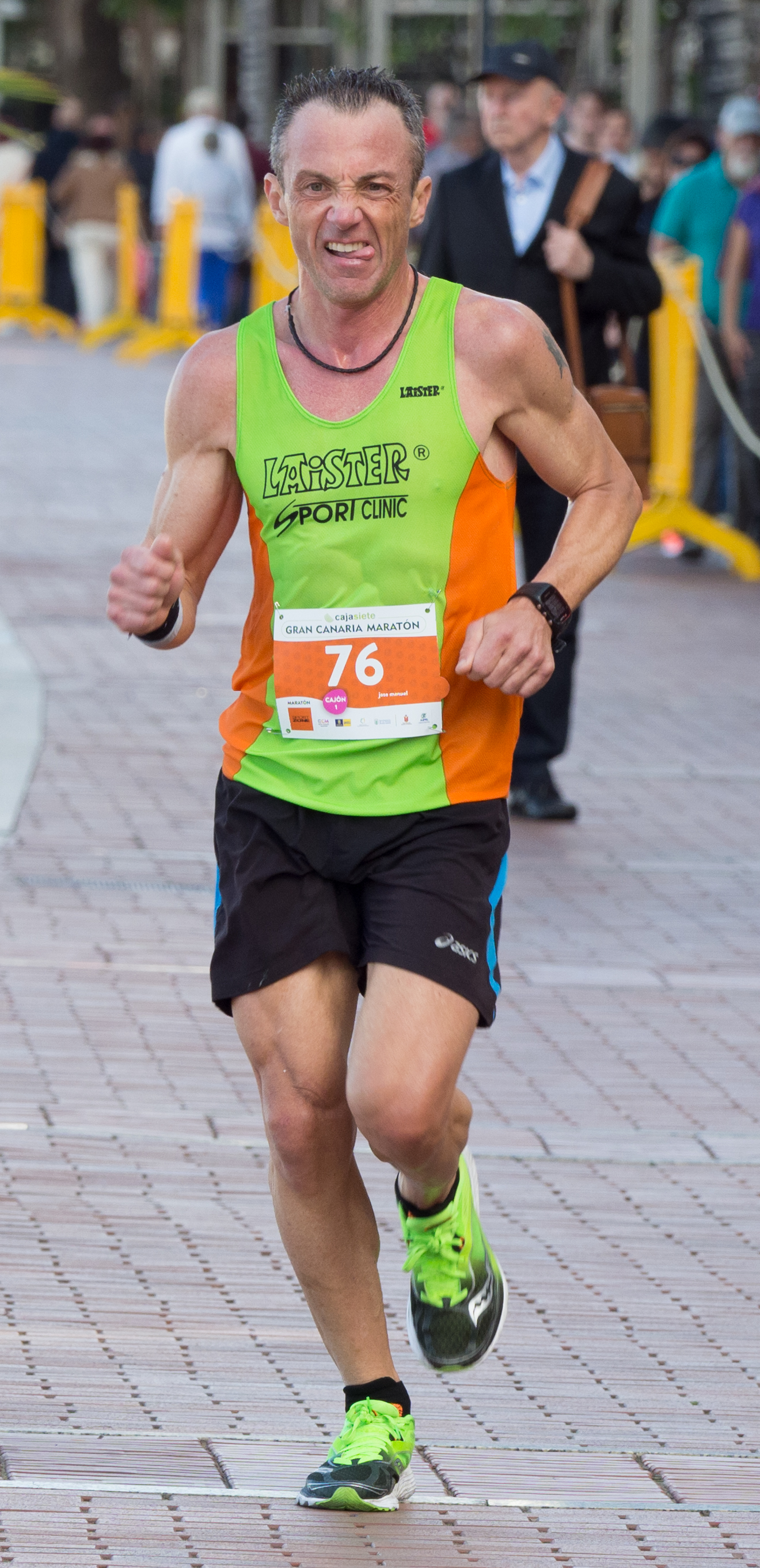
Gran Canaria Maraton 2017
