= Oleksandr Babarynka =

Ukrainian long-distance runner (born 1984)

Personal information
- Born: 22 May 1984 (age 42)

Sport
- Country: Ukraine
- Sport: Track and field
- Event: long-distance running
- Updated on 29 August 2015

Oleksandr Babarynka (born 2 May 1984) is a male Ukrainian long-distance runner. He competed in the marathon event at the 2015 World Championships in Athletics in Beijing, China, but did not finish. In 2012 he won the Utrecht Marathon in the Netherlands. He set his P.R. at the Dębno Marathon in Poland in 2015 in 2:14:39 where he finished in second place.

== See also ==
- Ukraine at the 2015 World Championships in Athletics
