= Quarter marathon =

Road running event

Quarter marathon (QM) refers to either an exact race of a quarter of a marathon (that is, 10.54875 kilometres or 6.55475 miles), or running for 10–15 kilometers (approx. 6.5–9 miles) without a rest. The former is held in many places around the world.

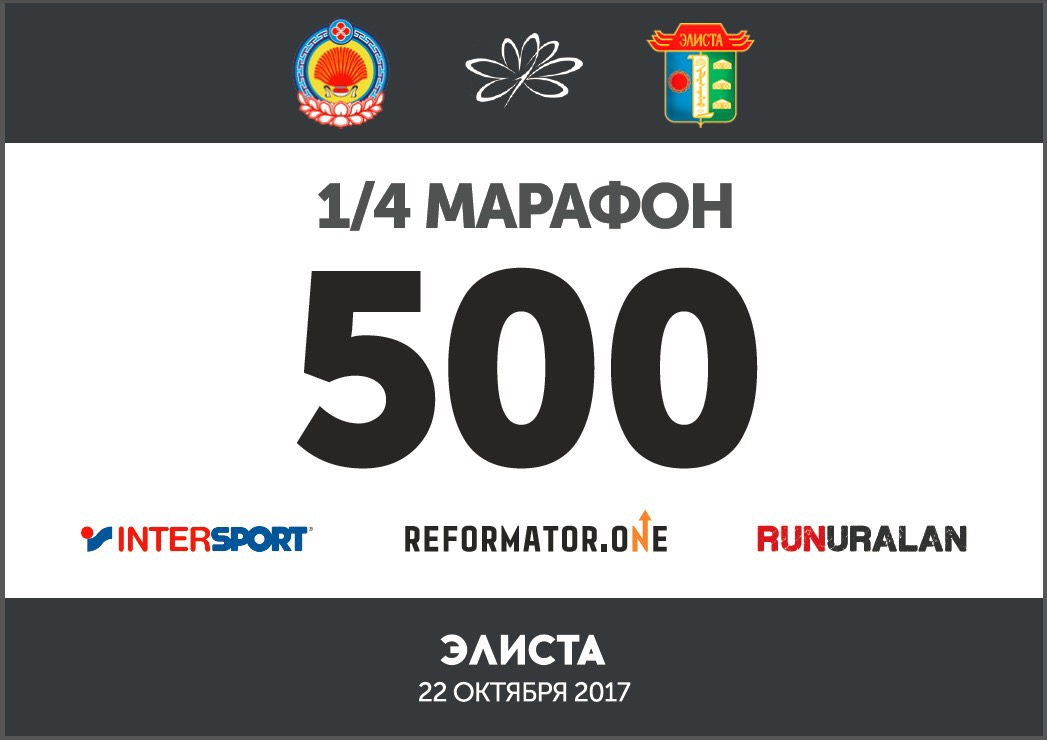
1/4 marathon race number at the RunUralan Kalmykia-2017 that took place on October 22, 2017 in Elista, Kalmyk republic, Russia

Sisaket, a north-eastern province in Thailand, holds quarter marathons on the third Sunday of December every year. Bushey, a town in East England also holds quarter marathons every July.

The Congleton Quarter Marathon was set up by the Congleton Lions; it afforded participants the opportunity to run alongside the half marathon runners. The Congleton Lions decided to stop organising the race in 2011, but the Congleton Harriers decided to save the race (with the support of the Congleton Lions, the Congleton Boalloy running club, the Cheshire Marshals, the Sandbach Scouts, the Army Cadets, the Air Training Corps and other local organisations). The Harriers did not include the quarter marathon in 2011 but decided to re-introduce it in 2012.

A quarter marathon is held alongside the Berlin Half Marathon each year as part of the Generalprobe, a “rehearsal” that occurs four weeks before the main Berlin Marathon event.

There is also a yearly Quarter Marathon event held in Bredon, Worcestershire since September 2012 organised by local race organisers.
