= Polar Circle Marathon =

Annual race held in Greenland

- Date: October
- Location: Kangerlussuaq, Greenland
- Event type: Ice, snow, gravel road
- Distance: Marathon
- Established: 2001
- Organizer: Albatros Adventure Marathons
- Course records: Men's: 2:53:45 (2018) (Greenland) Martin Møller; Women's: 3:34:34 (2019) (Italy) Birgit Klammer
- Website: Polar Circle Marathon
- Participants: 94 finishers (2021); 168 (2019); 122 (2018); 135 (2017)

The Polar Circle Marathon in Kangerlussuaq, Greenland is an annual marathon (42.195 km or 26.219 mi) that has the distinction of being situated on 66 degrees northern latitude, also known as the Polar Circle.

The Polar Circle Marathon is organized by Albatross Adventures. The race is far more demanding than usual marathons due to the cold weather and slippery surfaces on portions of the race that go over the actual ice cap. The temperatures generally hover around -10 to -15 degrees Celsius in October when the yearly race is held. The marathon course takes the runners over the permanent, 3 km thick ice cap and through tundras, moraine landscapes, glaciers, among other outstanding nature sceneries. Marathoners often encounter musk oxen, reindeer and other animals inhabiting the arctic desert.

== History ==
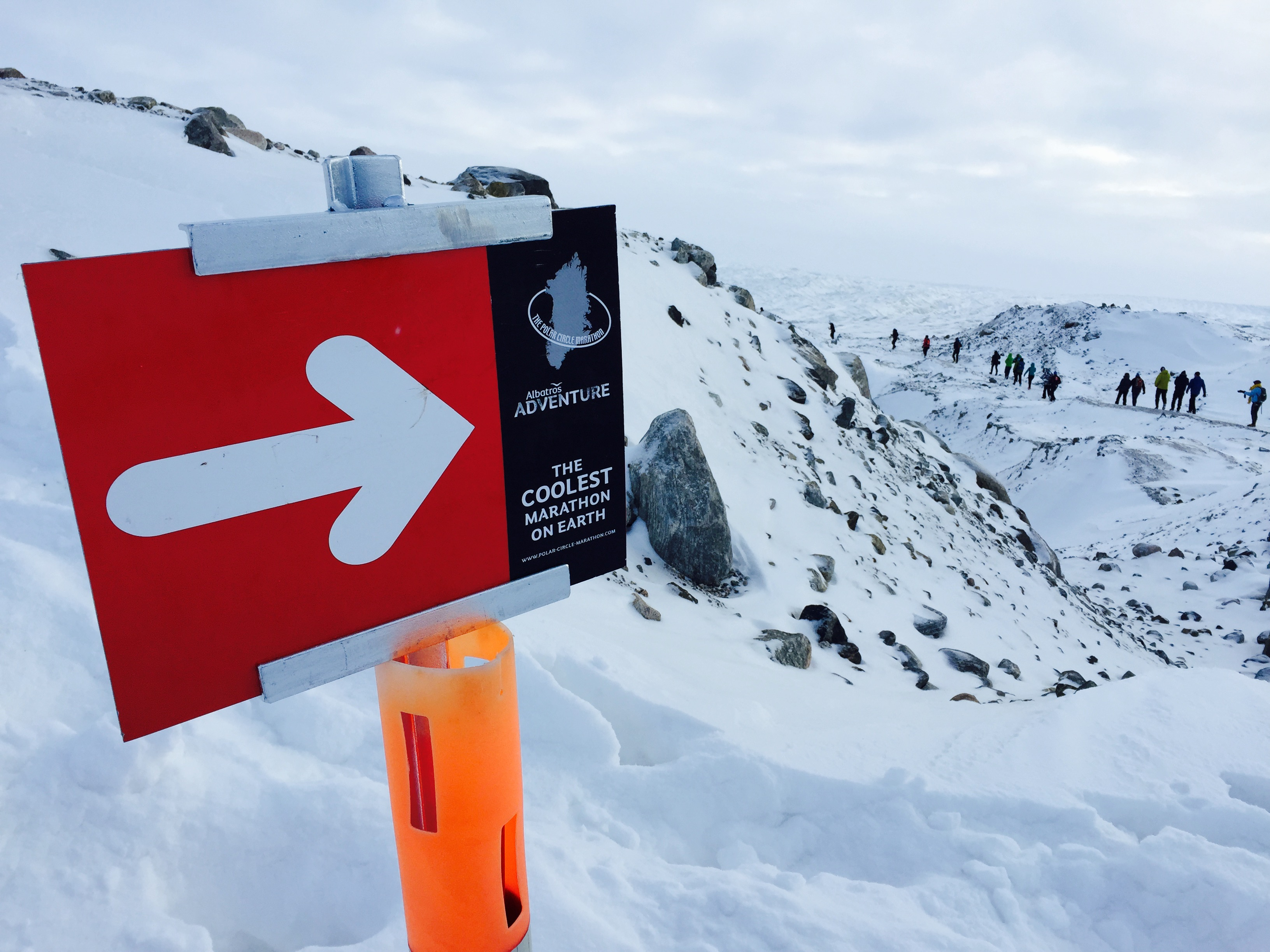
Polar Circle Marathon Greenland

The first Polar Circle Marathon was held in 2001 and has been held every year since in the month of October. It has been dubbed one of the most difficult and beautiful races on earth by a variety of magazines and blogs, including being ranked #3 in "Top 10 Insanely Hard Marathons" by TopTenz; the 2nd "Coolest Marathons in the World" by Healthy Living; and one of the "Coolest Marathon's You've Ever Heard of" by Men's Fitness.

== Course ==
A part of the route takes place on the ice sheet itself, but the main part of the course is run on the gravel road (often snow-covered) that connects the ice sheet with the small township of Kangerlussuaq, just north of the Polar Circle. The ice sheet can be very slippery and the danger of falls during this section is high. Due to the enormous powers of nature and the general retraction of the ice sheet, the exact distance on the ice will only be found a couple of days before the race, but a 3 km loop is aimed for. Because of the danger of falling into a crevasse, runners are strictly forbidden to leave the marked route on the ice sheet. Coming back up from the ice and passing the starting point, there is 32 km left to the finish line, which is in Kangerlussuaq. Running these remaining kilometers takes runners past enormous glacier tongues and moraine plains and goes through tundra and arctic desert. The terrain is hilly all the way with the steepest ascents being the climb coming off the ice sheet and the approximately 75m-high climb 5 km before the finish line. From the ice sheet to the finish line, however, the route has an overall descent of approximately 500m. The marathon finish line is located in front of Polar Lodge in the northern part of Kangerlussuaq.

The half marathon finish line is located at Long Lake, just before Sanddrift Valley. The exact route description is subject to change according to the forces of nature.

== Results ==
Key: Course record

Edition	Year	Men's winner	Time (h:m:s)	Women's winner	Time (h:m:s)
1st	2001	Torben Nielsen (DEN)	3:16:38	Elisa Laura Aqtagkât (GRO)	3:58:13
2nd	2002	Christian Isak (DEN)	3:09:10	Sarah Linnet (DEN)	3:57:47
—	2003	Was not held			
—	2004	Was not held			
3rd	2005	Andrew Shaw (GBR)	2:57:19	Elisa Laura Aqtagkât (GRO)	4:07:26
4th	2006	Bjarne Jensen (DEN)	4:03:23	Anna van Hees (NED)	4:45:43
—	2007	Was not held			
5th	2008	Eduardo Rodríguez (ESP)	3:15:25	Britt Folkerman (DEN)	4:08:15
6th	2009	Francisco Sánchez (ESP)	3:14:05	Marianne Delcomyn (DEN)	3:41:37
7th	2010	Jesper Rygård (DEN)	3:17:35	Maja Boe (DEN)	3:52:59
8th	2011	Torben Dahl (DEN)	3:02:57	Leah Glass (GBR)	4:18:57
9th	2012	Mark Nielsen (DEN)	3:28:25	Inge Seiding (DEN)	4:17:03
10th	2013	Ricardo Galo (POR)	3:15:04	Filipa Rosa (POR)	3:54:47
11th	2014	Norbert Zeppitz (AUT)	3:30:08	Debby Urkens (BEL)	4:11:26
12th	2015	Neill Weir (IRE)	3:17:47	Sinead Wearen (IRE)	4:28:30
13th	2016	Benedict Osborne (GBR)	3:38:43	Charlotte Olavsgård (DEN)	4:25:51
14th	2017	Felix Allen (GBR)	3:22:36	Inez-Anne Haagen (NED)	3:46:06
15th	2018	Martin Møller (GRL)	2:53:45	Louise Petersen (GRL)	4:14:51
16th	2019	Christian Stuffer (ITA)	2:59:35	Birgit Klammer (ITA)	3:34:34
—	2020	Was not held			
17th	2021	Henrik Fredelund (DEN)	3:35:32	Lisanne Vels (NED)	4:01:28
