= Utrecht Marathon =

Annual race in Utrecht, the Netherlands

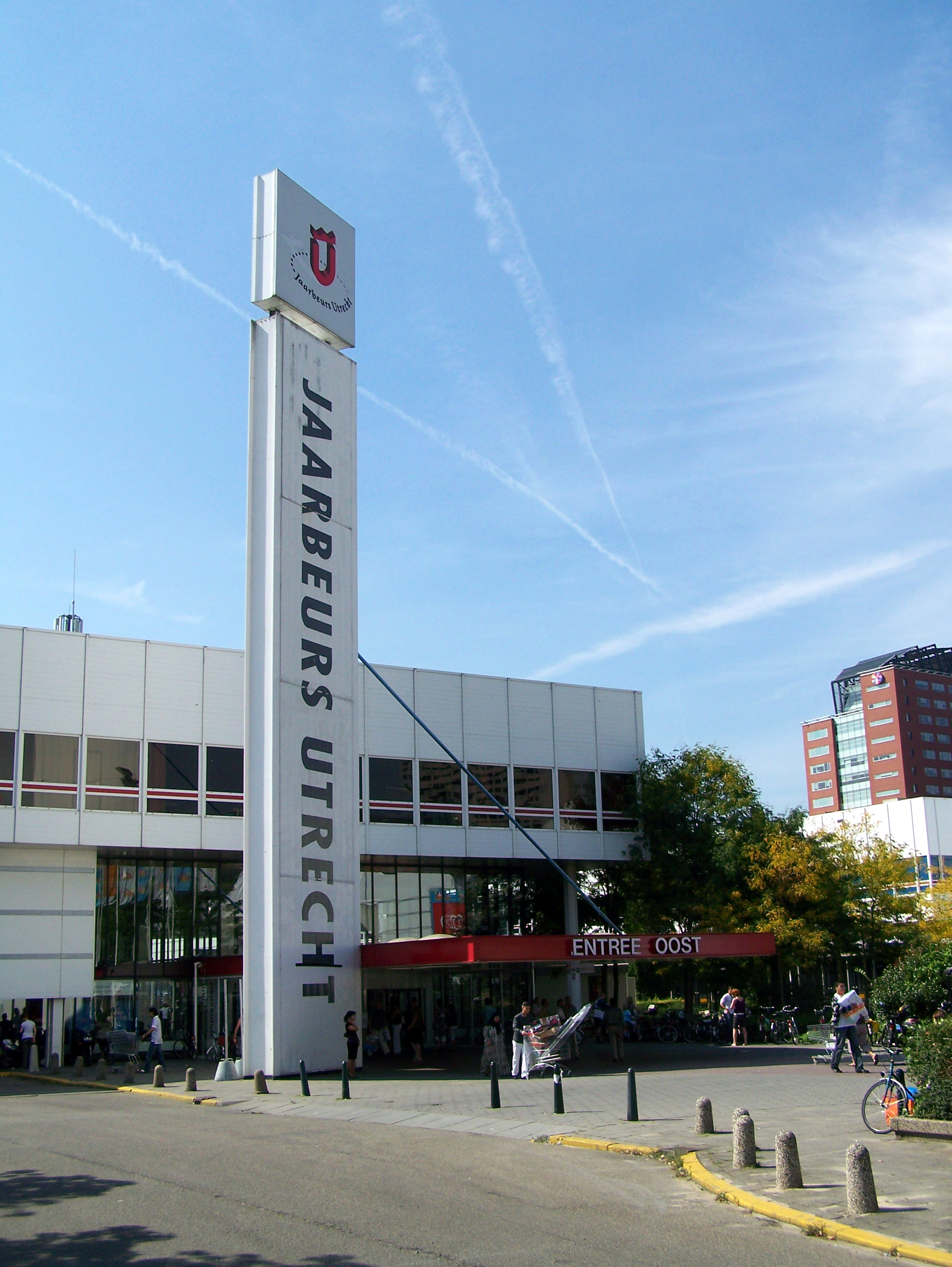
- The entrance of the Jaarbeurs Utrecht, near the start and finish point
- Date: April
- Location: Utrecht, Netherlands
- Event type: Road
- Distance: Marathon
- Established: 1978
- Website: Jaarbeurs Utrecht Marathon

The Utrecht Marathon is an annual marathon competition which takes place in Utrecht, the Netherlands, usually in April. It was first held in 1978. In addition to the main marathon competition, the day's events include a half marathon, 10 km, and 1.5 km races.

The marathon race records are 2:09:41 for men (set by William Kipchumba Kwambai in 2009) and 2:33:40 for women (set by Anne van Schuppen at the 1992 edition).

== History ==
First held in 1978 as the U N Marathon, the event featured a 42.195 km (26.22 mi) full marathon competition and also a 21.0975 km (13.11 mi) half marathon race. It attracted a largely domestic field of runners in its first decade and began to attract other European runners in the 1990s. The marathon race was removed from the programme of events between 1999 and 2004, and the city of Utrecht hosted just the half marathon during this period. Another organisation had created the Leidsche Rijn Marathon in 2000, whose course ran through the local area from Vleuten to De Meern. The race organiser groups combined their efforts in 2005, forming the Utrecht Marathon, and the city of Utrecht once again hosted annual marathon and half marathon races.

The race was formerly named the Jaarbeurs Utrecht Marathon for sponsorship reasons.

The 2013 race was cancelled due to a lack of sponsorship.

The Utrecht Marathon has had a restart under the name of Utrecht Science Park Marathon. Named after the University and Business centre in the east of the city, where the marathon starts and finishes.

The 2020 edition of the race was postponed to 2021 due to the coronavirus pandemic, with registrants having the option of transferring their entry to another runner.

== Course ==
The current marathon course is within the city and has a clock-wise looped format. The race starts and ends on Croeselaan, which is near Jaarbeurs Utrecht (a large building complex for events and trade fairs). The half marathon follows a shorter version of the marathon course while the 10 km and 5 km events follow a looped route close to the streets of the city centre.

== Prize money incentives ==
In response to the increasing dominance of Kenyan runners in Dutch marathons, Utrecht race organiser Louran van Keulen revised the prize money scheme for the 2011 edition of the event. He offered 100 € as the prize for first place, but a Dutch winner would receive up to 10,000 € in bonus prizes. Utrecht City Council, which subsidised the event, sought a review of whether the move was discriminatory towards foreign athletes and the council's executive for sport remarked that it "does not make the city look great". Van Keulen defended his position by arguing that he wanted to invest in grassroots sport and improve local facilities, with a long-term plan to see Dutch runners challenge Africans at the top level. He had specially selected twenty of the best Dutch male runners to participate in a "Dutch Battle" in Utrecht.

A Nairobi-based businessman, Gert-Jan van Wijk, disapproved of the prize scheme and offered to personally make up the difference for foreign athletes, saying: "I think the Netherlands is afraid of competition, afraid of the unknown, afraid of different cultures. Holland is turning inside herself, instead of becoming stronger by taking up the competition". A combination of the time needed to acquire a visa and lack of foreign invitations to the event meant that the regular Kenyan contingent, including 2008 winner Sammy Chumba, was absent that year. Young Dutchman Michel Butter was the 2011 winner, breaking a four-year Kenyan winning streak. Kenyan John Mutai Kipkorir, having entered the race among the fun runners and led in the latter stages, was the runner-up and received a one-off 4950 € payout from van Wijk for his performance.

== Past winners ==
=== Marathon ===
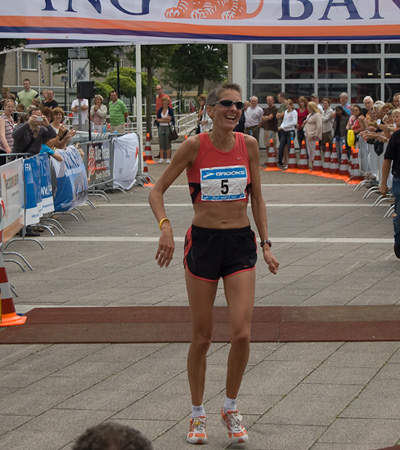
Dutchwoman Anne van Schuppen set the race record in 1992.

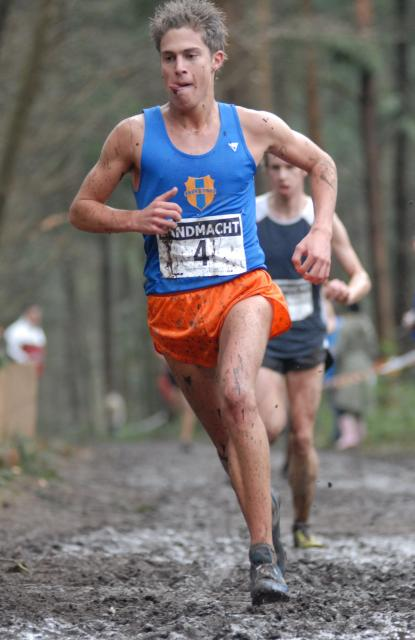
Michel Butter won the 2011 race.

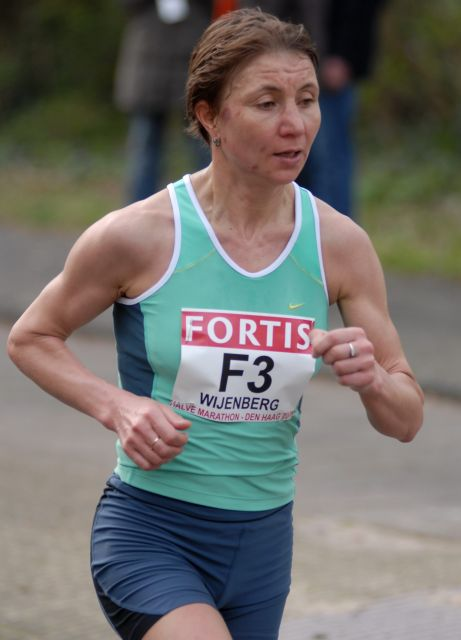
Nadezhda Wijenberg has won both the marathon and half marathon events.

Key: Course record Vleuten to De Meern course

Edition	Year	Men's winner	Time (h:m:s)	Women's winner	Time (h:m:s)
1st	1978	Cees Verhoef (NED)	2:25:07	?	?
2nd	1979	Bertus de Haan (NED)	2:29:42.2	?	?
3rd	1980	Cor Vriend (NED)	2:20:35	Lila Kalweit (FRG)	3:30:46
4th	1981	Jan Honcoop (NED)	2:28:11	Marian Hogerhoud (NED)	3:04:47
5th	1982	Stephen Glenn Forster (GBR)	2:17:59	Trijnie Smeenge (NED)	2:54:41
6th	1983	Rob Strik (NED)	2:21:11	?	?
7th	1984	Dick Bakker (NED)	2:25:32	Hanna Helsloot (NED)	3:09:49
8th	1985	Goof Schep (NED)	2:30:14	J Hendriks (NED)	3:10:28
9th	1986	Jacques Fiers (NED)	2:25:19	Joke Streefkerk (NED)	3:19:57
10th	1987	Wim Liefers (NED)	2:29:45	Anne Rindt (NED)	2:56:58
11th	1988	Wim van Weerdt (NED)	2:26:00	Marianne Knapen (NED)	2:54:11
12th	1989	Wim van Gemert (NED)	2:25:56	Els Raap (NED)	3:03:32
13th	1990	Wim van Gemert (NED)	2:26:58	Hennie Pot (NED)	3:03:00
14th	1991	Anthony Graham (GBR)	2:21:46	Annie van Stiphout (NED)	2:44:55
15th	1992	Cor Saelmans (BEL)	2:18:53	Anne van Schuppen (NED)	2:33:40
16th	1993	Philippe Steelandt (BEL)	2:23:11	Christel Rogiers (BEL)	3:04:18
17th	1994	Viktor Kharitonov (RUS)	2:25:20	Fiona Fjaberg (NED)	3:09:41
18th	1995	Christopher Penny (GBR)	2:20:39	Inge Guyt (NED)	3:03:28
19th	1996	Miroslaw Bugaj (POL)	2:25:38	Czeslawa Mentlewicz (POL)	2:55:36
20th	1997	Patrick Kooymans (BEL)	2:32:23	Antoinette Molegraaf (BEL)	3:32:50
21st	1998	Rachid Mohammadi (NED)	2:28:17	Lieve van Lint (NED)	3:06:56
—	1999	—	—	—	—
22nd	2000	Andrey Romaschenko (RUS)	2:18:43	Tatyana Perepyolkina (RUS)	2:42:59
—	2001	—	—	—	—
23rd	2002	Ronny Ligneel (BEL)	2:16:39	Jolanda de Klerk (NED)	3:09:33
24th	2003	Luc Krotwaar (NED)	2:13:41	Mounia Aboulahcen (BEL)	2:43:09
25th	2004	Ronny Ligneel (BEL)	2:18:28	Tatyana Perepyolkina (RUS)	2:43:15
26th	2005	Giorgio Calcaterra (ITA)	2:19:37	Tatyana Perepyolkina (RUS)	2:40:51
27th	2006	Gino van Geyte (BEL)	2:17:35	Nadezhda Wijenberg (NED)	2:45:00
28th	2007	Mariko Kiplagat (KEN)	2:11:16	Joanna Gront (POL)	2:47:11
29th	2008	Sammy Chumba (KEN)	2:12:07	Irene Cherop Loritareng (KEN)	2:41:44
30th	2009	William Kwambai Kipchumba (KEN)	2:09:41	Lydia Kurgat (KEN)	2:34:28
31st	2010	William Kwambai Kipchumba (KEN)	2:12:01	Olena Biloshchuk (UKR)	2:39:43
32nd	2011	Michel Butter (NED)	2:17:36	Pauline Claessen (NED)	2:56:22
33rd	2012	Aleksandr Babaryka (UKR)	2:19:10	Sharon Tavengwa (ZIM)	2:35:26

- Note: No marathon was held in Utrecht in 1999 and the 2001 event was cancelled due to an outbreak of foot-and-mouth disease.

=== Half marathon ===
Year	Men's winner	Time (h:m:s)	Women's winner	Time (h:m:s)
2012	Jorit van Malsen (NED)	1:06:57	Mariska Dute (NED)	1:21:15
2011	Stijn Fincioen (BEL)	1:06.52	Nadezhda Wijenberg (NED)	1:20.11
2010	Stefan Van Den Broek (BEL)	1:05.17	Naomi Jepkosgei (KEN)	1:15.31
2009	Hugo van den Broek (NED)	1:05.44	Sarah Jeriwoi (KEN)	1:17.14
2008	El Hassane Ben Lkhainouch (FRA)	1:04.08	Filomena Chepchirchir (KEN)	1:15.56
2007	Al Mustafa Riyadh (BHR)	1:02.59	Filomena Chepchirchir (KEN)	1:10.44
2006	Aart Stigter (NED)	1:09.47	Kristijna Loonen (NED)	1:20.14
2005	Rik Ceulemans (BEL)	1:04.15	Kristijna Loonen (NED)	1:14.53
