= Nuuk Marathon =

Marathon race in Nuuk, Greenland

- Status: active
- Genre: sports competition
- Date: August
- Frequency: Annual
- Country: Greenland
- Inaugurated: 1990

Nuuk Marathon is a marathon event held annually in the Greenlandic capital of Nuuk. It has been held since 1990 and attracts around 350 competitors.

== Route ==
The Nuuk Marathon's route is 21,097.5 metres (13 miles 192.5 yards) doubled. The route passes Old Nuuk and the old houses at the colonial harbour, and moves through the suburb of Nuussuaq, past Nuuk Airport and the new district of Qinngorput and across some demanding inclines framed by the mountains before returning to Nuuk.
