= Cross de l'Acier =

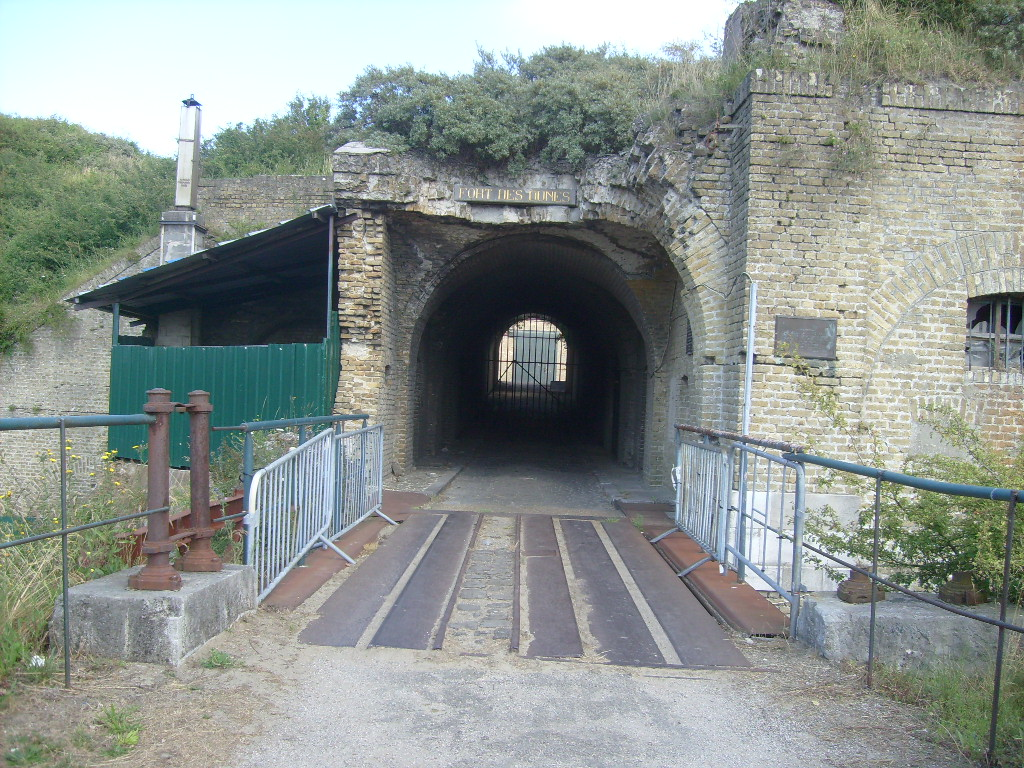
- The Fort des Dunes, an old military fortification, is the race venue
- Date: Late November
- Location: Leffrinckoucke, France
- Event type: Cross country
- Distance: 9.95 km for men 6.55 km for women
- Established: 1990
- Website: Cross de l'Acier
- Participants: 135 (2019)

The Cross de l'Acier (English: Cross of Steel) was an annual cross country running competition held in late November in Leffrinckoucke, France. First held in 1990, it was one of the foremost competitions of its type in France. Ten races were held at the event for athletes of varying abilities. Around 2200 runners took part in the day's event in 2010. Due to the COVID-19 pandemic and disagreements with the National Athletics League, it was announced that the race would be discontinued in 2022 after two years absence.

The course of the competition was held around the Fort des Dunes – part of a set of military fortifications used in the First World War known as the Séré de Rivières system. The men's international elite race covered 9.95 km while the women's race took place over 6.55 km. These races were often used by French athletes to gain selection for the national team at the European Cross Country Championships, which is held a month after the event. The elite competition held permit status from European Athletics.

Over its history, the cross attracted elite runners of the highest calibre and former winners include multiple world record breaker Haile Gebrselassie, World Cross Country champions Zola Budd and Joseph Ebuya, and track world champions Fernanda Ribeiro and Linet Masai. Although many of the competition's most successful runners hail from East Africa, the race also features prominent European runners: Paulo Guerra and Mo Farah both won the European Championships after winning in Leffrinckoucke a month previously.

== Past senior race winners ==
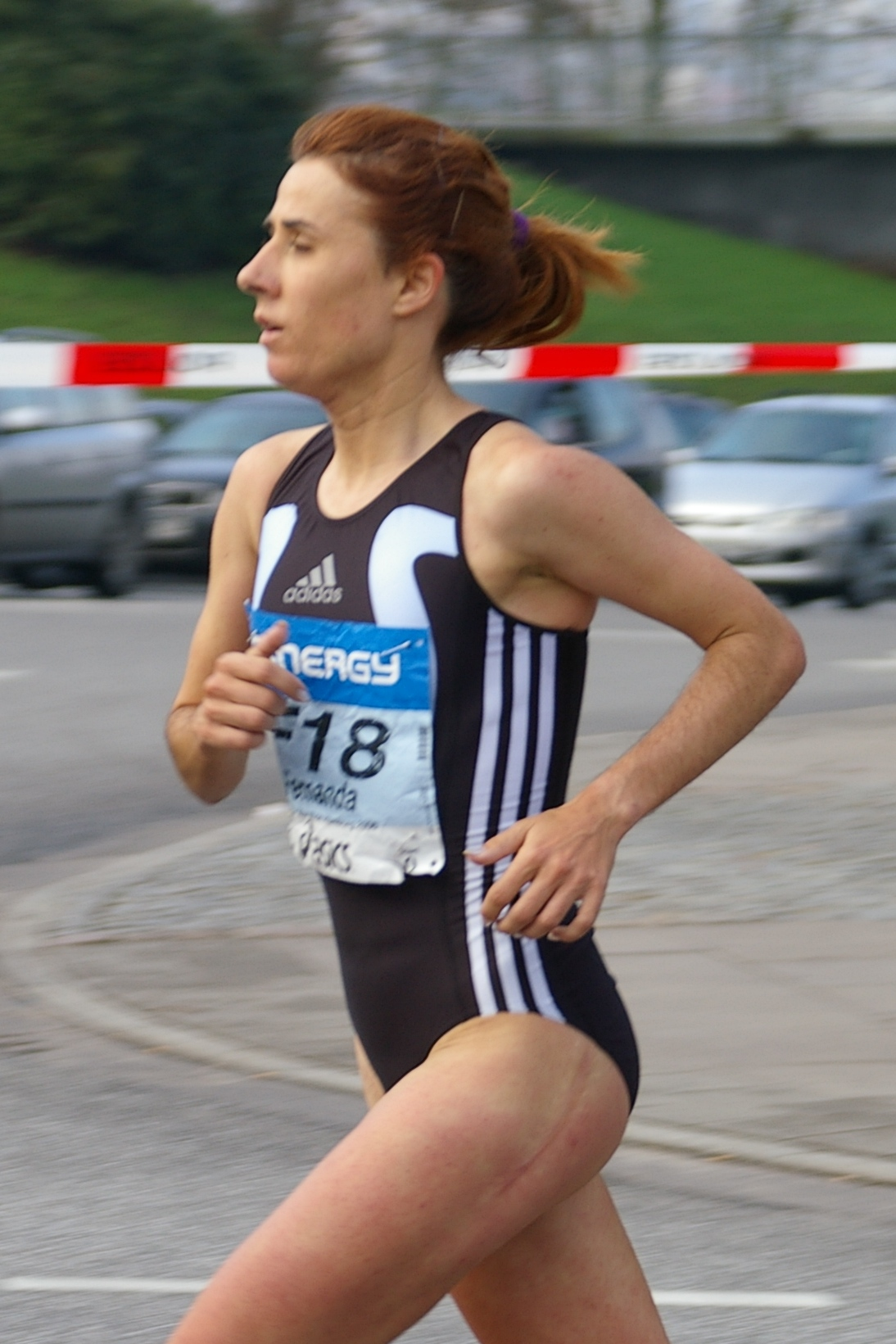
Olympic champion Fernanda Ribeiro took the women's title in 1995.

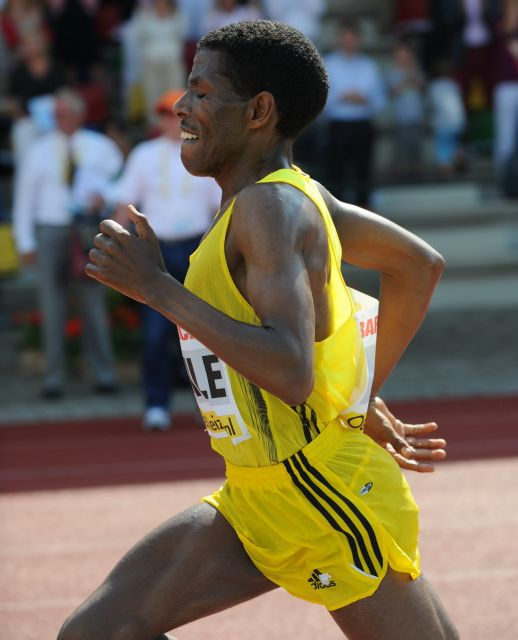
Haile Gebrselassie won the men's race in 2001.

| Edition | Year | Men's winner | Time (m:s) | Women's winner | Time (m:s) |
|---|---|---|---|---|---|
| 1st | 1990 | Bruno Levant (FRA) | | Nancy Pattee (BEL) | |
| 2nd | 1991 | Thierry Pantel (FRA) | | Albertina Dias (POR) | |
| 3rd | 1992 | Wilson Omwoyo (KEN) | | Albertina Dias (POR) | |
| 4th | 1993 | Vincent Rousseau (BEL) | | Zola Budd (RSA) | |
| 5th | 1994 | Paulo Guerra (POR) | | Fatuma Roba (ETH) | |
| 6th | 1995 | Worku Bikila (ETH) | | Fernanda Ribeiro (POR) | |
| 7th | 1996 | Tom Nyariki (KEN) | | Margarita Marusova (RUS) | |
| 8th | 1997 | Tom Nyariki (KEN) | | Jackline Maranga (KEN) | |
| 9th | 1998 | Hailu Mekonnen (ETH) | | Jackline Maranga (KEN) | |
| 10th | 1999 | Hailu Mekonnen (ETH) | | Naomi Mugo (KEN) | |
| 11th | 2000 | Luke Kipkosgei (KEN) | | Ayelech Worku (ETH) | |
| 12th | 2001 | Haile Gebrselassie (ETH) | | Tereza Yohannes (ETH) | |
| 13th | 2002 | Hailu Mekonnen (ETH) | | Mestawet Tufa (ETH) | |
| 14th | 2003 | John Yuda (TAN) | | Gelete Burka (ETH) | |
| 15th | 2004 | Tibebu Yenew (ETH) | | Isabella Ochichi (KEN) | |
| 16th | 2005 | Dennis Ndiso (KEN) | | Teyba Erkesso (ETH) | |
| 17th | 2006 | Mohammed Farah (GBR) | | Dorcus Inzikuru (KEN) | |
| 18th | 2007 | Imane Merga (ETH) | | Linet Masai (KEN) | |
| 19th | 2008 | Imane Merga (ETH) | 28:15 | Abebu Gelan (ETH) | 18:20 |
| 20th | 2009 | Imane Merga (ETH) | | Vivian Cheruiyot (KEN) | |
| 21st | 2010 | Joseph Ebuya (KEN) | 28:08 | Linet Masai (KEN) | 21:40 |
| 22nd | 2011 | Joseph Ebuya (KEN) | 28:10 | Feyse Tadese (ETH) | 21:09 |
| 23rd | 2012 | Cornelius Kangogo (KEN) | 28:14 | Waganesh Mekasha (ETH) | 21:23 |
| 24th | 2013 | Cornelius Kangogo (KEN) | 28:07 | Hiwot Ayalew (ETH) | 22:30 |
| 25th | 2014 | Birhan Nebebew (ETH) | 28:58 | Senbere Teferi (ETH) | 23:33 |
| 26th | 2015 | Alfred Ngeno (KEN) | 30:06 | Dera Dida (ETH) | 24:13 |
| 27th | 2016 | Selemon Barega (ETH) | 26:12 | Beyenu Degefa (ETH) | 21:48 |
| 28th | 2017 | Birhanu Balew (BHR) | 30:53 | Margaret Chelimo (KEN) | 23:38 |
| 29th | 2018 | Solomon Berihu (ETH) | 30:41 | Letesenbet Gidey (ETH) | 25:25 |
| 30th | 2019 | Berihu Aregawi (ETH) | 30:04 | Aberash Belay (ETH) | 25:01 |
