= Gloria Kite =

Kenyan long-distance runner (born 1998)

Gloriah Kite
Personal information
- Full name: Gloria Kite Chebiwott; Gloria Chebiwatt Kite
- Nationality: Kenya
- Born: 10 January 1998 (age 28) Moiben, Uasin Gishu County, Kenya
- Agent: Gianni Demadonna
- Residence: Iten, Kenya

Sport
- Sport: Athletics
- Events: 3000 metres, 5000 metres, 10K run
- Coached by: Joseph Cheromei

Achievements and titles
- World finals: 2022 Eugene; • 5000 m: 10th, 15:01.22
- National finals: 2014 Kenyan U20 XC; • 6 km, 9th; 2016 Kenyan U20s; • 1500m, 5th; 2017 Kenyan U20 XC; • 6 km, 22nd; 2017 Kenyan Champs; • 1500m, 6th
- Personal bests: 3000m: 8:29.91 (2019); 5000m: 14:49.22 (2019); 10K: 30:26 (2019)
Medal record
Women's athletics
Representing Kenya
African Cross Country Championships
Silver medal – second place	2016 Yaoundé	Junior race
Gold medal – first place	2016 Yaoundé	Team race
East Africa Junior Championships
Silver medal – second place	2016 Dar es Salaam	1500 m

Gloria Kite Chebiwott (born 10 January 1998), also spelled Gloriah Kite, is a Kenyan long-distance runner. She finished 9th in the 5000 metres at the 2022 World Athletics Championships, but was subsequently suspended for doping until August 2024, due to a positive test in May 2022 that was determined to be unintentional.

== Biography ==
Kite is from Iten, Kenya where she attended Saint Patrick's High School and was trained early on by famed coach Brother Colm O'Connell. Kite's first international race was at the 2016 African Cross Country Championships, where she won the individual silver medal in the U20 race and helped carry Kenya to the U20 team title.

Later that year, Kite won a silver medal at the 2016 East and Central Africa Junior Athletics Championships in the 1500 metres.

In 2018, Kite won the Cross Internacional de Soria cross-country race in a time of 28:47. She won despite miscounting her laps, turning towards the finish too early and having to double back and run extra course loops.

In 2022, Kite finished just 8th at the Kenyan trials for 5000 m but nonetheless was selected to represent at Kenya at the 2022 World Athletics Championships, along with Trials second-placer Beatrice Chebet and third-placer Margaret Kipkemboi. At the World Championships, Kite finished 6th in her heat to advance by time, and she finished 9th in the final behind both of her compatriots.

Kite also ran as a pacemaker at some long-distance races.

== Doping ban ==
On 6 February 2023, it was announced that Kite was banned from professional athletics competition for two years, beginning back-dated to 12 August 2022.

The ban was due to the presence of anabolic androgenic steroids in a sample taken on 14 May 2022. Kite claimed that she wasn't feeling well and went to see a doctor, who prescribed her vitamin B complex tablets not knowing that she was a professional athlete. As part of the investigation, the vitamin B tablets were tested and found to contain the prohibited substance. She was able to provide the doctor's note proving her visit, leading to a reduced sentence of 2 years instead of 4 years. Kite did not ask for her 'B' sample to be tested.

== Statistics ==
=== Personal bests ===
Event	Mark	Competition	Venue	Date
3000 metres	8:29.91	Doha Diamond League	Doha, Qatar	3 May 2019
5000 metres	14:49.22	London Diamond League	London, United Kingdom	21 July 2019
10K run	30:26	Valencia Ibercaja 10K	Valencia, Spain	13 January 2019
