= 2016 East and Central Africa Junior Athletics Championships =

- Dates: 28–29 April
- Host city: Dar es Salaam, Tanzania

The 2nd East and Central Africa Junior Athletics Championships was held in Dar es Salaam, Tanzania from 28 to 29 April 2016.

At the championships, Kenyan athletes won 13 gold medals to defend their team title.

== Medal summary ==
=== Men ===
Chronology: 2013 | 2016

Event	Gold		Silver		Bronze	
100 metres	Gulam Khamis; Zanzibar	10.27	Moffat Ngari; Kenya	10.57	Maohaed Mohamed; Sudan	10.79
200 metres	Gulam Khamis; Zanzibar	20.97	Geofrey Kiprotich Rono; Kenya	21.27	Moffat Ngari; Kenya	21.61
400 metres	Kelvin Tanui; Kenya	46.26	Ronald Afya; Kenya	47.51	Samuel Oweka; Uganda	49.08
800 metres	Wickliffe Kanyamal; Kenya	1:50.17	Mekonen Ayele; Ethiopia	1:50.43	Abdi Fatah Awlet; Djibouti	1:51.73
1500 metres	Boaz Kiprugut; Kenya	3:39.46	Mmaru Berete Mekonen; Ethiopia	3:39.86	Anthony Kiptoo; Kenya	3:40.33
5000 metres	Peter Langat; Kenya	13:43.86	Wesley Ladema; Kenya	13:48.95	Selemon Barega; Ethiopia	13:49.53
4 × 100 metres relay	Kenya (KEN); Ronald Afya; Kevin Tanui; Geofrey Kiprotich Rono; Moffat Ngari	41.71	Tanzania (TAN); Benjamin Michael; Adnan Haruna; Kenneth Maluba; Imani James	42.58	Zanzibar (ZAN); Gulam Hamisi; Ali Hassan Khamis; Hassan Omar Khatib; Omar Rashid Said	43.00
4 × 400 metres relay	Kenya (KEN); Kelvin Tanui; Geofrey Kiprotich Rono; Moffat Ngari; Markson Paima	3:11.04	Sudan (SUD); Al Had Hamid Adam; Mohamed Mohamed; Yasili Ahmed Abuh; Adam Abdul Wahab	3:17.83	Tanzania (TAN); Hafidhi Khalfan; Adinani Haruna; Francis Propser; John Silima	3:30.05
Long jump	Lagat Kibet; Kenya	7.47 m	Yasir Elsid; Sudan	6.72 m	Benjamin Michael; Tanzania	6.17 m
Javelin throw	Moses Oceng; Uganda	59.18 m	Sabas Daniel; Tanzania	56.33 m	William Magok; South Sudan	54.94 m
Discus throw	Odong Baya; Uganda	43.02 m	Sabas Daniel; Tanzania	39.21 m	Hafidh Ali Hamad; Zanzibar	35.30 m
Shot put	Odong Baya; Uganda	14.77 m	Hamad Ali; Zanzibar	13.62 m	Sabas Daniel; Tanzania	13.20 m
Triple jump	Lagat Kibet; Kenya	15.16 m	Yasir Ahmed Abo; Sudan	13.83 m	Hussein Yusuph; Zanzibar	12.25 m

=== Women ===
Chronology: 2013 | 2016

Event	Gold		Silver		Bronze	
100 metres	Safa Abdekarim; Sudan	12.10	Venice Mukonyo; Kenya	12.69	Clare Byato; Uganda	12.72
200 metres	Maureen Ngatichi; Kenya	24.25	Eunice Makonyo; Kenya	25.35	Safa Abdelkarim; Sudan	25.65
400 metres	Maureen Nyatich; Kenya	54.14	Jane Njoki; Kenya	56.03	Abebe Firke; Sudan	56.85
800 metres	Tebo Kotema; Ethiopia	2:04.89	Honorine Irbigiza; Rwanda	2:07.65	Josephine Cheregat; Kenya	2:08.56
1500 metres	Feyisa Anbesa; Ethiopia	4:16.12	Gloria Kite; Kenya	4:17.50	Beata Nishmwe; Rwanda	4:18.02
5000 metres	Sandrafelis Tuei; Kenya	16:15.80	Imaculata Chepkurui; Kenya	16:26.97	Macyelene Chelangat; Uganda	16:29.56
4 × 100 metres relay	Kenya (KEN); Maureen Ngatich; Eunice Mukonyo; Damaris Akoth; Jane Njoki	48.93	Uganda (UGA); Clare Bayto; Agnes Apio; Rosemary Acen; Mary Auma	49.61	Zanzibar (ZAN); Himidia Omary Ally; Saraya Ulimjwengu; Kazija Hassan Simai; Asha Ali Othman	50.44
4 × 400 metres relay	Kenya (KEN); Maureen Ngatich; Jane Njoki; Eunice Mukonyo; Damaris Okoth	3:53.28	Uganda (UGA); Clare Byato; Rosemary Acen; Mary Auma; Janeth Chemusto	4:02.40	Tanzania (TAN); Jane Maige; Bitrina Michael; Rose Seif; Regina Deogratius	4:04.90
Long jump	Rose Seif; Tanzania	5.31 m	Awid Victoria; Uganda	4.62 m	Clare Bayton; Uganda	4.43 m
Javelin throw	Josephine Lalam; Uganda	44.95 m	Victoria Awidi; Uganda	43.19 m	Mwanaamina Hassani; Tanzania	38.93 m

== Medal table ==
* Host nation (Tanzania)

Rank	Nation	Gold	Silver	Bronze	Total
1	Kenya (KEN)	13	8	4	25
2	Uganda (UGA)	4	5	3	12
3	Ethiopia (ETH)	2	2	2	6
4	Zanzibar (ZAN)	2	1	4	7
5	Tanzania (TAN)*	1	3	5	9
6	Sudan (SUD)	1	3	3	7
7	Rwanda (RWA)	0	1	1	2
8	Djibouti (DJI)	0	0	1	1
8	South Sudan (SSD)	0	0	1	1
10	Somalia (SOM)	0	0	0	0
Totals (10 entries)		23	23	24	70
