= Gebrehiwot =

Gebrehiwot is both a surname and a given name. Notable people with the name include:

- Eleni Gebrehiwot (born 1984), German long-distance runner
- Mulugeta Gebrehiwot, peace researcher, founder of the Institute for Peace and Security Studies in 2007
- Gebrehiwot Baykedagn (1886–1919), Ethiopian doctor, economist, and intellectual
