= 2016 African Cross Country Championships =

IV Africa Cross Country Championships
- Organisers: CAA
- Edition: 4th
- Date: 12 March 2016
- Host city: Yaoundé, Cameroon
- Events: 4
- Participation: 151 athletes from 16 nations

The 2016 African Cross Country Championships was the fourth edition of the international cross country running competition for African athletes organised by the Confederation of African Athletics. It was held on 12 March at the Yaounde Golf Club in Yaoundé, Cameroon – the first time a West African nation had hosted the event since its re-launch in 2011. There were four races on the program: 10 km for senior men, 8 km for senior women, 7 km for junior men and 5.5 km for junior women.

For a fourth successive time, Kenya dominated the event, led by men's winner James Gitahi Rungaru and women's winner Alice Aprot Nawowuna. The country also provided the junior winners (Miriam Cherop and Isaac Kipsang) and topped the team podium in all four races. Only two non-Kenyans won an individual medal: Phillip Kipyeko of Uganda was the men's runner-up and Eritrea's Aron Kifle took third in the men's junior race. Kenya swept the medals on the women's side, including a perfect score of ten in the junior race.

There were 151 racers in all, including 46 men who finished the senior race, 43 men who finished the junior race, 29 women who finished the senior race, and 33 women who finished the junior race. The competition had reduced international participation, with only 16 nations sending athletes – eight fewer than had done so in 2014.

== Medallists ==
=== Individual ===
Event	Gold		Silver		Bronze	
Senior men's 10 km	James Gitahi Rungaru (KEN)	26:34	Phillip Kipyeko (UGA)	26:35	Charles Yosei Muneria (KEN)	26:46
Senior women's 8 km	Alice Aprot Nawowuna (KEN)	29:52	Sheila Chepkirui (KEN)	30:44	Beatrice Mutai (KEN)	31:08
Junior men's 7 km	Isaac Kipsang (KEN)	21:33	Ronald Kiprotich (KEN)	21:44	Aron Kifle (ERI)	21:48
Junior women's 5.5 km	Miriam Cherop (KEN)	18:31	Gloria Kite (KEN)	18:39	Winfredah Mbithe (KEN)	18:40

=== Team ===
Event	Gold		Silver		Bronze	
Senior men's 10 km	Kenya (KEN); Rungaru; Muneria; Cleophas Ngetich; Geoffrey Koech	13	Uganda (UGA); Kipyeko; Abdallah Mande; Daniel Rotich; Moses Kurong	30	Ethiopia (ETH); Getaneh Tamire; Birhan Nebebew; Mogos Tuemay; Yihunilign Adane	41
Senior women's 8 km	Kenya (KEN); Nawowuna; Chepkirui; Mutai; Daisy Jepkemei	11	Ethiopia (ETH); Dera Yami; Kidsan Alema; Alamerew Tirusew; Fotyen Tesfay	33	South Africa (RSA); Dina Lebo Phalula; Lebogang Phalula; Andrea Steyn; Murhendwa Dhavanha	65
Junior men's 7 km	Kenya (KEN); Kipsang; Kiprotich; Anthony Kiptoo; Andrew Lorot	12	Ethiopia (ETH); Tefera Mosisa; Solomon Berihum; Gurmessa Nega; Biyazen Alehegn	38	South Africa (RSA); Ikageng Gaorekwe; Kabelo Melamu; Rowhaldo Ratz; Kabelo Seboko	81
Junior women's 5.5 km	Kenya (KEN); Cherop; Kite; Mbithe; Lucy Cheruiyot	10	Ethiopia (ETH); Muliye Dekebo; Tersit Desalgn; Zerfie Limeneh; Tiblet Getaneth	26	Morocco (MAR); Hanane Bouaggad; Imane Bouhali; Rahima Tahiri; Meryam Kamali	82

== Participation ==
- Algeria
- Benin
- Botswana
- Cameroon
- Eritrea
- Ethiopia
- Kenya
- Malawi
- Morocco
- Namibia
- Nigeria
- South Africa
- Senegal
- Sudan
- Uganda
- Zimbabwe

== See also ==
- 2016 Asian Cross Country Championships
- 2016 European Cross Country Championships
