= Wyclife Kinyamal =

Kenyan middle-distance runner

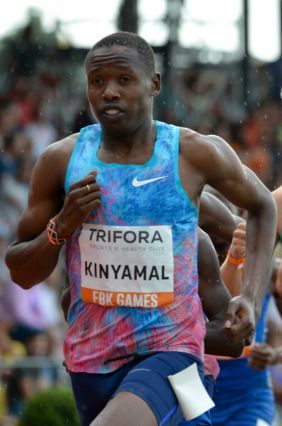

Personal information
- Full name: Wyclife Kinyamal Kisasy
- Born: 2 July 1997 (age 29) Trans Mara District, Kenya
- Height: 1.85 m (6 ft 1 in)
- Weight: 69 kg (152 lb)

Sport
- Sport: Athletics
- Event: 800 metres

Achievements and titles
- Personal best: 800 m: 1:42.08 (Paris 2024)
Medal record
Men's athletics
Representing Kenya
Commonwealth Games
Gold medal – first place	2018 Gold Coast	800 m
Gold medal – first place	2022 Birmingham	800 m
Bronze medal – third place	2026 Glasgow	800 m

Wyclife Kinyamal Kisasy (born 2 July 1997) is a Kenyan male middle-distance runner who competes in the 800 metres. He won a gold medal at the 2018 Commonwealth Games and holds a personal best of 1:42.08 minutes.

== Career ==
Born in Trans Mara District, he made his first impact regionally at the 2016 East and Central Africa Junior Athletics Championships, winning the 800 m. He placed third at the Kenyan World Junior trials later that year, thus was not picked for the national team. He had initially just focused on the high jump and took up running when he had completed high school at Mogonga Secondary School.

Kinyamal established himself as an elite level runner in the 2017 season with performances on the European track circuit. At the FBK Games he set a personal best of 1:45.65 minutes to place second behind Thijmen Kupers, then won the Palio Città della Quercia in a meeting record of 1:43.94 minutes. The latter performance ranked him seventh in the world on time for that season.

The following year he set an indoor best of 1:46.54 minutes as runner-up at the PSD Bank Meeting. With a second-place finish at the Kenyan Commonwealth Games trials, he earned his first senior international selection. At the 2018 Commonwealth Games he defeated defending champion Nijel Amos in the final to become the Commonwealth champion. This was Kenya's first gold medal of the tournament that year, as his compatriots had thus far failed to win any of the distance events in which the country is traditionally strong. In July he improved his PB to 1:43.12 taking third at the Diamond League meeting at London.

== International competitions ==
Year	Competition	Venue	Position	Event	Notes
2016	East African Junior Championships	Dar es Salaam, Tanzania	1st	800 m	1:50.17
2018	Commonwealth Games	Gold Coast, Australia	1st	800 m	1:45.11
2022	World Championships	Eugene, United States	8th	800 m	1:47.07
2023	World Championships	Budapest, Hungary	13th (h)	4 × 400 m relay	3:01.41
2024	Olympic Games	Paris, France	11th (sf)	800 m	1:45.29
2026	Commonwealth Games	Glasgow, United Kingdom	3rd	800 m	1:46.12
