= 2016 African Championships in Athletics – Women's 5000 metres =

The women's 5000 metres event at the 2016 African Championships in Athletics was held on 23 June in Kings Park Stadium.

== Results ==
Rank	Athlete	Nationality	Time	Notes
1st place, gold medalist(s)	Sheila Chepkirui	Kenya	15:05.45	CR
2nd place, silver medalist(s)	Margaret Chelimo	Kenya	15:07.56	
3rd place, bronze medalist(s)	Dera Dida	Ethiopia	15:15.26	
4	Meskerem Mamo	Ethiopia	15:18.06	
5	Kidas Alema	Ethiopia	15:39.27	
6	Cavaline Nahimana	Burundi	15:47.90	NR
7	Rachael Zena Chebet	Uganda	15:53.50	
8	Nebyat Abraham	Eritrea	15:55.47	
9	Kokob Tesfagabr	Eritrea	15:57.54	
10	Ndeshimona Ekandjo	Namibia	16:28.90	
11	Mercy Malembo	Malawi	16:48.31	
12	Bibiro Ali Taher	Chad	17:32.71	NR
13	Falicia Oyo	South Sudan	18:27.53	NR
	Beatrice Kamulhanga	Democratic Republic of the Congo	DNS	
	Olivia Chitate	Zimbabwe	DNS	
	Warda Dugessa	Sudan	DNS	
