= Sheila Chepkirui =

Kenyan middle- and long-distance runner

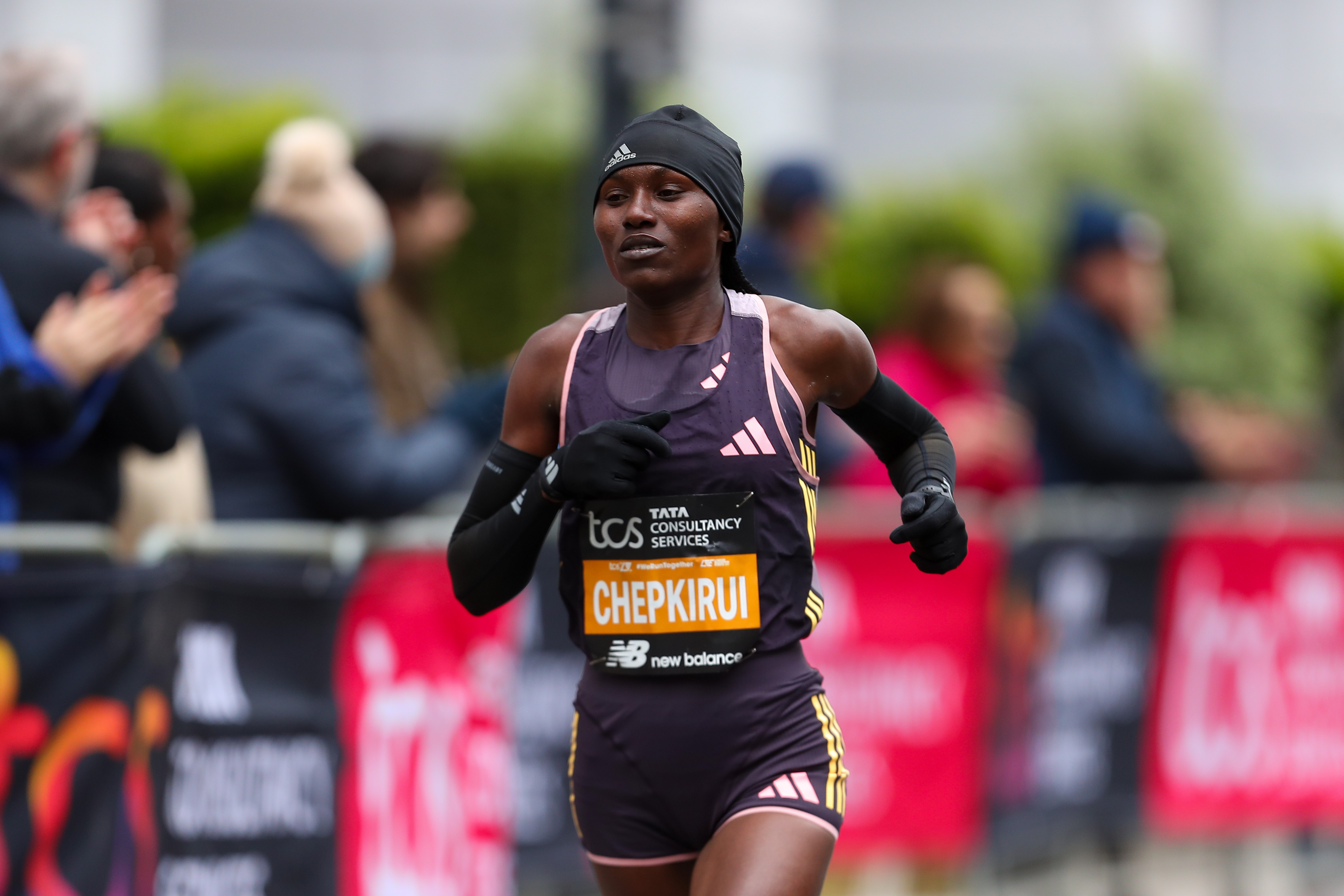
- Chepkirui at the 2024 London Marathon

Personal information
- Full name: Sheila Chepkirui Kiprotich
- Nationality: Kenyan
- Born: 27 December 1990 (age 35)

Sport
- Country: Kenya
- Sport: Track and field
- Events: Middle-, Long-distance running

Achievements and titles
- Personal bests: 1500 m: 4:12.29 (Marrakesh 2005); 3000 m: 8:45.94 (Somerville 2017); 5000 m: 14:54.05 (London 2017); 10,000 m: 30:45.81 (Stockholm 2021); Road; 10 km: 29:46 (Valencia 2020); Half marathon: 1:04:36 (Ras Al Khaimah 2022); Marathon: 2:17:29 (Valencia 2022)
Medal record
Women's athletics
Representing Kenya
World Marathon Majors
Gold medal – first place	2024 New York	Marathon
Gold medal – first place	2026 New York	Marathon
Silver medal – second place	2023 Berlin	Marathon
Bronze medal – third place	2025 New York	Marathon
Commonwealth Games
Bronze medal – third place	2022 Birmingham	10,000 m
African Championships
Gold medal – first place	2016 Durban	5000 m
World Youth Championships
Gold medal – first place	2005 Marrakesh	1500 m
Bronze medal – third place	2007 Ostrava	1500 m
African Cross Country Championships
Silver medal – second place	2016 Yaoundé	Senior race

Sheila Chepkirui Kiprotich (born 27 December 1990) is a Kenyan middle- and long-distance runner who competed at first in the 1500 metres and 5000 metres. She won the New York City Marathon in 2024 and 2026, and the bronze medal in the 10,000 metres at the 2022 Commonwealth Games. Chepkirui was the 5000 m 2016 African champion, setting the championship record.

In September 2022, she was fourth in the 10 km road race on the world all-time list.

== Career ==
In her youth, Sheila Chepkirui competed in age category competitions. She defeated Yuriko Kobayashi over 1500 m at the 2005 World Youth Championships in Athletics to claim her first international gold medal. Her finishing time of in a 4:12.29 minutes was a championship record. She returned to defend her title two years later, but ended up as bronze medallist at the 2007 event. She failed to improve at the 2008 World Junior Championships in Athletics and did not get past the heats. She dropped out of the sport after that year.

Chepkirui joined up with Kenya Defence Forces and began competing at their track competitions again around 2012. She returned to top-level competition in late 2015. Good performances at national cross country running meets culminated in her finishing third at the Kenyan Cross Country Championships. She was chosen for the 2016 African Cross Country Championships and in her senior debut she took the silver medal as part of a Kenyan podium sweep with Alice Aprot and Beatrice Mutai. Later that year she won the 5000 m at the Kenyan Athletics Championships, and won her first senior title competing in the event at the 2016 African Championships in Athletics, setting a championship record of 15:05.45 minutes.

In September 2022, she came close to the women-only 10 kilometres world record at the Brașov Running Festival in Brașov, Romania. With her time of 30:07 Chepkirui, who set her 29:46 personal best in a mixed race in Valencia in 2020, broke the Romanian all-comers's record by more than two minutes, and was only six seconds off the women-only world record.

In November 2024, Chepkirui won the New York City Marathon's women's race, securing her first major marathon title with a time of 2:24:35. She won that race again in November 2026, with a time of 2:24.36.

== International competitions ==
Representing Kenya
Year	Competition	Venue	Position	Event	Notes
2005	World Youth Championships	Marrakesh, Morocco	1st	1500 m	4:12.29
2007	World Youth Championships	Ostrava, Czech Republic	3rd	1500 m	4:19.26
2008	World Junior Championships	Bydgoszcz, Poland	15th (h)	1500 m	4:24.21
2016	African Cross Country Championships	Yaoundé, Cameroon	2nd	Senior race	30:44
2016	African Cross Country Championships	Yaoundé, Cameroon	1st	Senior team	11 pts
2016	African Championships	Durban, South Africa	1st	5000 m	15:05.45 CR
2017	World Championships	London, United Kingdom	7th	5000 m	14:54.05
2022	World Championships	Eugene, United States	–	10,000 m	DNS
2022	Commonwealth Games	Birmingham, United Kingdom	3rd	10,000 m	31:09.46
2023	London Marathon	London, United Kingdom	4th	Marathon	2:18:51
2023	Berlin Marathon	Berlin, Germany	2nd	Marathon	2:17:49
2024	London Marathon	London, United Kingdom	6th	Marathon	2:19:31
2024	New York City Marathon	New York City, United States	1st	Marathon	2:24:35
2025	New York City Marathon	New York City, United States	3rd	Marathon	2:20:24
2026	New York City Marathon	New York City, United States	1st	Marathon	2:24.36

== National titles ==
- Kenyan Athletics Championships
  - 5000 metres: 2016, 2019
