= Charles Yosei Muneria =

Kenyan long-distance runner

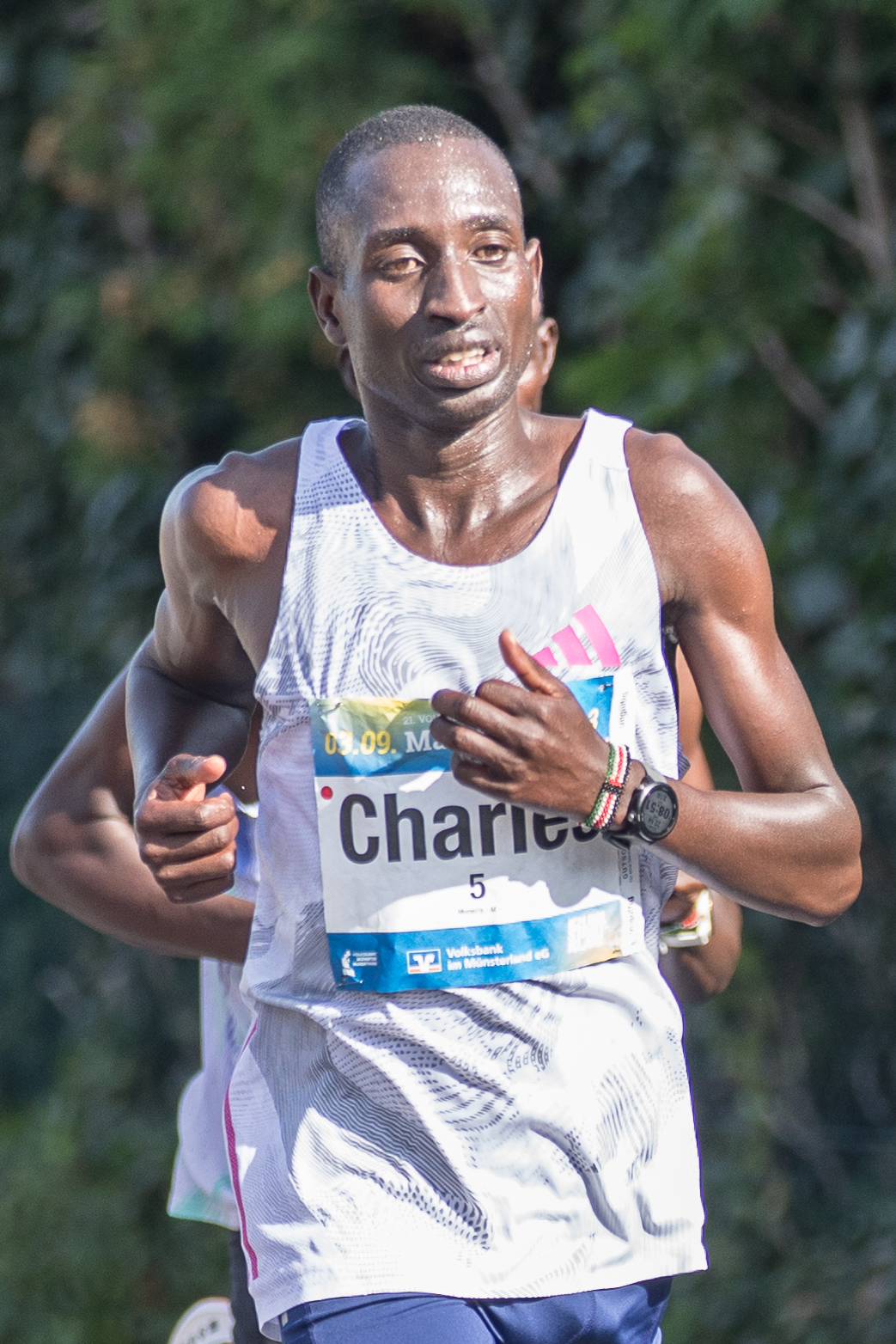
- Charles Yosei Muneria at the 21st Münster Marathon on 3 September 2023

Personal information
- Nationality: Kenyan
- Born: February 10, 1996 (age 30)
- Height: 1.67 m (5 ft 5 1/2 in)
- Weight: 55 kg (121 lb)

Sport
- Sport: Men's athletics
- Events: 5000 metres, 10,000 metres

Achievements and titles
- Personal bests: 5000 m: 13:23.79 min (2016); 10,000 m: 27:54.6 min (2016)
Medal record
Representing Kenya
African Cross Country Championships
Bronze medal – third place	2016 Yaoundé	Senior race
Gold medal – first place	2016 Yaoundé	Senior team
African Beach Games
Silver medal – second place	2019 Sal	Men's Half Marathon

Charles Yosei Muneria (born 10 February 1996) is a Kenyan long-distance runner who competes in track and cross country running events. He represented his country at the 2016 Summer Olympics. He was an individual and team medallist at the African Cross Country Championships in 2016.

Muneria made his first high level forays in running at Moroccan road races, taking eighth at the 2014 Marrakesh 10K and the 2015 Rabat Half Marathon. A breakthrough over 10,000 metres followed at the Kenyan Athletics Championships in 2015, where he was runner-up in 27:54.6 minutes, though he was slower at the World Championships trials. He gained his first national selection after a fourth-place finish at the Kenyan Cross Country Championships. At the 2016 African Cross Country Championships he finished with a bronze medal, helping Kenya to the team gold medals alongside the winner James Gitahi Rungaru. He surprised with a runner-up finish in the 10,000 m at the 2016 Athletics Kenya Olympic Trials behind Paul Tanui. In an unusual selection decision, he was listed in the initial 10,000 m team, but was then entered in the shorter 5000 m race.

At the 2016 Rio Olympics he was one of three Kenyans, alongside Caleb Ndiku and Isiah Koech, who failed to progress to the Olympic 5000 metres final. This was the first time this had happened in Kenya's Olympic history since 1956. Former athletes were highly critical: 1988 Olympic champion John Ngugi said preparation was inadequate and the runners were not mentally prepared, while former world champion Benjamin Limo singled out Muneria's selection for the shorter track distance as a poor choice, saying Muneria "looked tactless".

On 3 September 2023, Muneria set a new track record at the 42.195 km Münster Marathon, finishing first after 02:09:06 h.

== Personal bests ==
- 5000 metres – 13:23.79 min (2016)
- 10,000 metres – 27:57.07 min (2016)

All information from All-Athletics profile.

== International competitions ==
Year	Competition	Venue	Position	Event	Notes
2016	African Cross Country Championships	Yaoundé, Cameroon	3rd	Senior race	26:46
2016	African Cross Country Championships	Yaoundé, Cameroon	1st	Senior team	8pts
2016	Olympic Games	Rio de Janeiro, Brazil	27th (h)	5000 m	13:30.95
2019	African Games	Rabat, Morocco	–	10,000 m	DNF
2023	Münster Marathon	Münster, NRW	1st	Marathon (42.195 km)	02:09:06
