= Münster Marathon =

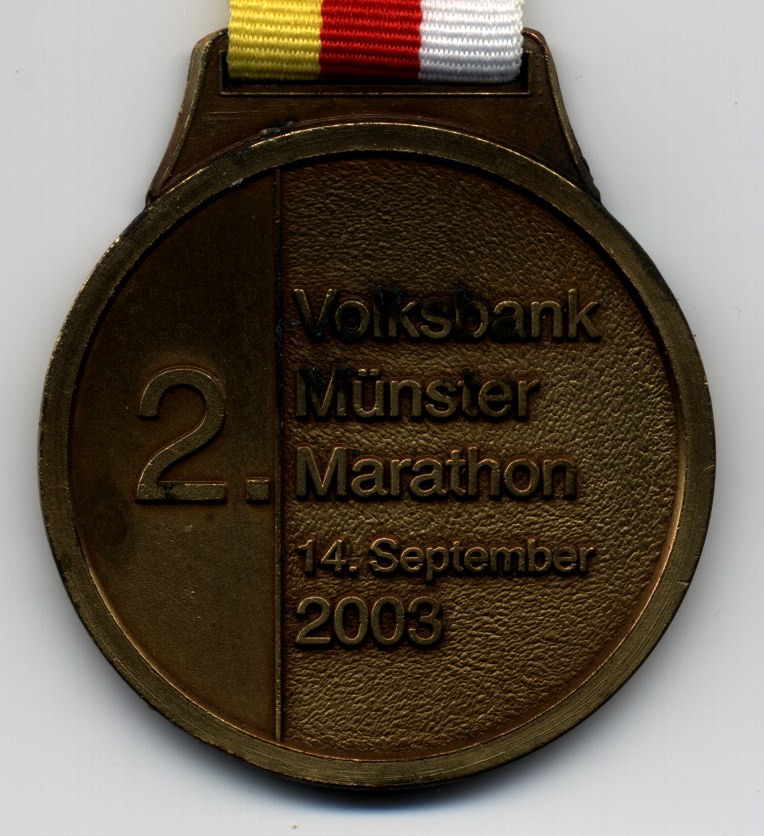
- Date: September
- Location: Münster, Germany
- Event type: Road
- Distance: Marathon
- Primary sponsor: Volksbank Münsterland Nord
- Established: 2002
- Course records: Men's: 2:09:07 (2023) (Kenya) Charles Muneria; Women's: 2:27:39 (2022) (Kenya) Lilian Jelagat
- Website: Official website
- Participants: 1,772 finishers (2023); 1,728 (2019)

The Münster Marathon is an annual marathon road running event which takes place in September in the city of Münster, Germany.

== Past winners ==
Key: Course record Country's championship race

| Edition | Date | Men's winner | Time (h:m:s) | Women's winner | Time (h:m:s) |
|---|---|---|---|---|---|
| 1st | 8 September 2002 | Janusz Sarnicki (POL) | 2:25:08 | Janina Malska (POL) | 2:50:54 |
| 2nd | 14 September 2003 | Tomasz Chawawko (POL) | 2:27:50 | Janina Malska (POL) | 2:46:19 |
| 3rd | 5 September 2004 | Simon Lopuyet (KEN) | 2:18:40 | Ewa Fliegert (POL) | 2:51:34 |
| 4th | 11 September 2005 | Francis Kiprop (KEN) | 2:14:17 | Romina Sedoni (ITA) | 2:38:53 |
| 5th | 10 September 2006 | Shadrack Maru (KEN) | 2:17:37 | Olena Shurkhno (UKR) | 2:37:50 |
| 6th | 9 September 2007 | Francis Kiprop (KEN) | 2:15:54 | Krystyna Kuta (POL) | 2:41:19 |
| 7th | 14 September 2008 | Richard Ngolepus (KEN) | 2:14:21 | Joanna Chmiel (POL) | 2:45:48 |
| 8th | 13 September 2009 | Richard Chepkwony (KEN) | 2:12:02 | Ecler Loywapet (KEN) | 2:37:06 |
| 9th | 12 September 2010 | Patrick Muriuki (KEN) | 2:10:25 | Volha Salevich (BLR) | 2:34:58 |
| 10th | 11 September 2011 | Elijah Yator (KEN) | 2:13:10 | Sviatlana Kouhan (BLR) | 2:35:35 |
| 11th | 9 September 2012 | Nasef Ahmed (MAR) | 2:12:22 | Joan Rotich (KEN) | 2:38.13 |
| 12th | 8 September 2013 | Evans Taiget (KEN) | 2:15:56 | Eleni Gebrehiwot (GER) | 2:29:12 |
| 13th | 14 September 2014 | Josphat Kiprono (KEN) | 2:10:40 | Yemealem Ayano (ETH) | 2:40:40 |
| 14th | 6 September 2015 | Josphat Kiprono (KEN) | 2:12:16 | Nancy Koech (KEN) | 2:30:23 |
| 15th | 11 September 2016 | Duncan Koech (KEN) | 2:12:59 | Elizabeth Rumokol (KEN) | 2:33:01 |
| 16th | 10 September 2017 | Paul Maina (KEN) | 2:11:22 | Rose Maru (KEN) | 2:33:05 |
| 17th | 9 September 2018 | Justus Kiprotich (KEN) | 2:09:28 | Sheila Rono (KEN) | 2:45:46 |
| 18th | 8 September 2019 | James Barmasai (KEN) | 2:11:40 | Chaltu Negasa (ETH) | 2:30:59 |
| 19th | 12 September 2021 | Samuel Lomoi (KEN) | 2:12:14 | Monica Cheruto (KEN) | 2:35:17 |
| 20th | 11 September 2022 | Workneh Fikire (ETH) | 2:10:11 | Lilian Jelagat (KEN) | 2:27:39 |
| 21st | 3 September 2023 | Charles Muneria (KEN) | 2:09:07 | Rebecca Jeruto (KEN) | 2:29:13 |
| 22nd | 8 September 2024 | Collins Kemboi (KEN) | 2:10:52 | Rebecca Jeruto (KEN) | 2:32:25 |
