= Simon Lopuyet =

Kenyan marathon runner

Simon Lopuyet (born 24 December 1972) is a Kenyan marathon runner.

He has won several European races, such as the 1994 and 1995 Tilburg Ten Miles, the 1995 Lisbon Half Marathon, 2001 Cologne Marathon, the 2004 Münster Marathon and the 2005 Hannover Marathon.

His personal best times are 1:00:26 hours in the half marathon, achieved at the 1995 Lisbon Half Marathon; and 2:08:19 hours in the marathon, achieved when finishing fourth at the 1997 Rotterdam Marathon.
