= Battle of Dunkirk =

1940 battle between the Allies and Germany in France

- Part of the Battle of France in the Second World War
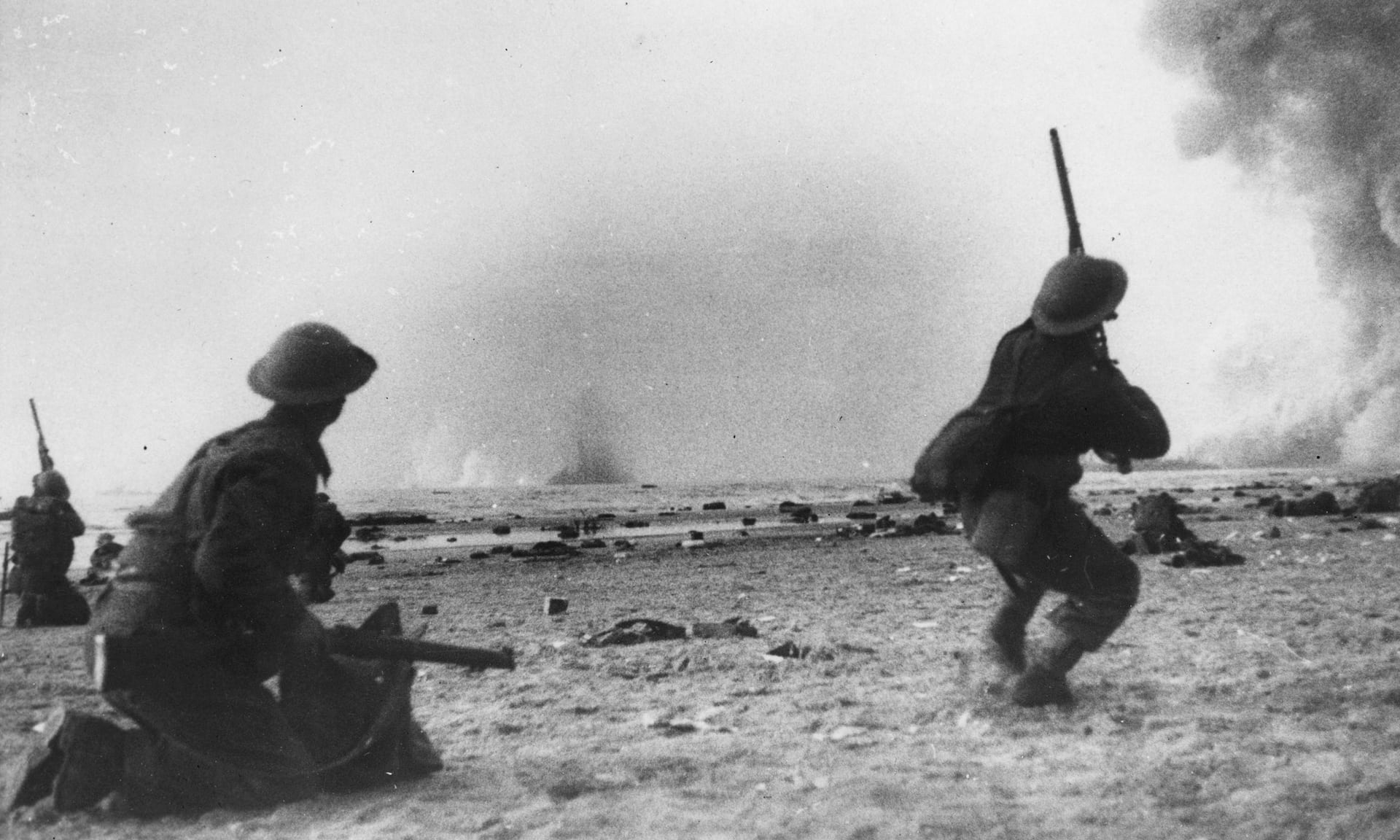
- "Soldiers from the British Expeditionary Force fire at low flying German aircraft during the Dunkirk evacuation" – Soldiers were strafed and bombed by German aircraft
Date	26 May – 4 June 1940
Location	Dunkirk, France 51°02′54″N 2°22′51″E
Result	See aftermath

Belligerents
United Kingdom; France; Belgium; Netherlands	Germany

Commanders and leaders
(French Third Republic) Maxime Weygand; (French Third Republic) Georges Blanchard; (French Third Republic) René Prioux; (French Third Republic) J.M. Charles Abrial; (United Kingdom) Lord Gort; (United Kingdom) Bertram Ramsay; (United Kingdom) Alan Brooke; (United Kingdom) Ronald Adam; (United Kingdom) William Tenant	(Nazi Germany) Walther v. Brauchitsch; (Nazi Germany) Hermann Göring; (Nazi Germany) Gerd von Rundstedt; (Nazi Germany) Ewald von Kleist; (Nazi Germany) Günther von Kluge; (Nazi Germany) Fedor von Bock; (Nazi Germany) Georg von Küchler

Strength
approx. 400,000; 338,226 evacuated	approx. 800,000

Casualties and losses
Estimated total casualties 61,774 killed, wounded, or captured; (France) French; 18,000 killed; 40,000 prisoners; 3 destroyers; (United Kingdom) British; c. 68,111 killed; c. 41,000 prisoners; 63,879 vehicles including tanks and motorcycles; 2,472 field guns; 6 destroyers; 23 destroyers damaged; 89 transport ships; 177 aircraft destroyed or damaged in total; 127 belonged to RAF Fighter Command.	(Nazi Germany) Estimated total casualties 20,000 killed or wounded; 100 tanks; 240 aircraft in theatre; 156 aircraft on Dunkirk front
- Civilian casualties: 2,000 (1,000 killed in air raids, at least 1,000 lost on the HMT Lancastria)

The Battle of Dunkirk (French: Bataille de Dunkerque) was fought around the French port of Dunkirk (Dunkerque) during the Second World War, between the Allies and Nazi Germany. As the Allies were losing the Battle of France on the Western Front, the Battle of Dunkirk was the defence and evacuation of British and other Allied forces to Britain from 26 May to 4 June 1940.

After the Phoney War, the Battle of France began on 10 May 1940. To the east, the German Army Group B invaded the Netherlands and advanced westward. In response, the Supreme Allied Commander, French General Maurice Gamelin, initiated "Plan D" and British and French troops entered Belgium to engage the Germans in the Netherlands. French planning for war relied on the Maginot Line fortifications along the German–French border protecting the region of Lorraine but the line did not cover the Belgian border. German forces had already crossed most of the Netherlands before the French forces had arrived. Gamelin instead committed the forces under his command – three mechanized forces, the French First and Seventh Armies and the British Expeditionary Force (BEF) – to the River Dyle. On 14 May, German Army Group A burst through the Ardennes and advanced rapidly westward toward Sedan, turning northward to the English Channel, using Generalfeldmarschall Erich von Manstein's plan Sichelschnitt (under the German strategy Fall Gelb), effectively flanking the Allied forces.

A series of Allied counter-attacks, including the Battle of Arras, failed to sever the German spearhead, which reached the coast on 20 May, separating the BEF near Armentières, the French First Army, and the Belgian Army further to the north from the majority of French troops south of the German penetration. After reaching the Channel, the German forces swung north along the coast, threatening to capture the ports and trap the British and French forces.

In one of the most debated decisions of the war, the Germans halted their advance on Dunkirk. What became known as the "Halt Order" did not originate with Adolf Hitler. Generaloberst (Colonel-General) Gerd von Rundstedt and Generaloberst Günther von Kluge suggested that the German forces around the Dunkirk pocket should cease their advance on the port and consolidate to avoid an Allied breakout. Hitler sanctioned the order on 24 May with the support of the Oberkommando der Wehrmacht (German Armed Forces High Command). The army halted for three days, which gave the Allies time to organise the Dunkirk evacuation and build a defensive line. More than 330,000 Allied troops were evacuated through Dunkirk, but the British and French forces sustained heavy casualties and lost nearly all their equipment. Around 16,000 French and 1,000 British soldiers were killed during the evacuation. The British Expeditionary Force lost approximately 68,111 soldiers during the French campaign.

== Prelude ==
On 10 May 1940, Winston Churchill became Prime Minister of the United Kingdom. By 26 May, the BEF and the French 1st Army were bottled up in a corridor to the sea, about 60 miles (97 km) deep and 15 miles (24 km) wide. Most of the British forces were still around Lille, over 40 miles (64 km) from Dunkirk, with the French farther south. Two massive German armies flanked them. General Fedor von Bock's Army Group B was to the east, and General Gerd von Rundstedt's Army Group A to the west. Both officers were later promoted to field marshal.

== Halt order ==
During the following days... it became known that Hitler's decision was mainly influenced by Goering. To the dictator the rapid movement of the Army, whose risks and prospects of success he did not understand because of his lack of military schooling, became almost sinister. He was constantly oppressed by a feeling of anxiety that a reversal loomed...

— Halder, in a letter of July 1957

The day's entry concludes with the remark: "The task of Army Group A can be considered to have been completed in the main"—a view which further explains Rundstedt's reluctance to employ his armoured divisions in the final clearing-up stage of this first phase of the campaign.

— Major L. F. Ellis

Brauchitsch is angry ... The pocket would have been closed at the coast if only our armour had not been held back. The bad weather has grounded the Luftwaffe and we must now stand and watch countless thousands of the enemy get away to England right under our noses.

— Franz Halder, written in his diary on 30 May

General Hans Jeschonnek overheard Hitler explaining his halt before Dunkirk: "The Führer wants to spare the British a humiliating defeat." Hitler later explained to a close friend, "The blood of every single Englishman is too valuable to shed. Our two peoples belong together racially and traditionally. That is and always has been my aim, even if our generals can't grasp it."

— Kilzer, Louis C., Hitler's Traitor: Martin Bormann and the Defeat of the Reich

On 24 May, Hitler visited General von Rundstedt's headquarters at Charleville. The terrain around Dunkirk was thought unsuitable for armour. Von Rundstedt advised him the infantry should attack the British forces at Arras, where the British had proved capable of significant action, while Kleist's armour held the line west and south of Dunkirk to pounce on the Allied forces retreating before Army Group B. Hitler, who was familiar with Flanders' marshes from the First World War, agreed. This order allowed the Germans to consolidate their gains and prepare for a southward advance against the remaining French forces.

Luftwaffe commander Hermann Göring asked for the chance to destroy the forces in Dunkirk. The Allied forces' destruction was thus initially assigned to the air force while the German infantry organised in Army Group B. Von Rundstedt later called this "one of the great turning points of the war".

The true reason for the decision to halt the German armour on 24 May is still debated. One theory is that Von Rundstedt and Hitler agreed to conserve the armour for Fall Rot ("Case Red"), an operation to the south. It is possible that the Luftwaffe's closer ties than the army's to the Nazi Party contributed to Hitler's approval of Göring's request. Another theory—which few historians have given credence—is that Hitler was still trying to establish diplomatic peace with Britain before Operation Barbarossa (the invasion of the Soviet Union). Although von Rundstedt after the war stated his suspicions that Hitler wanted "to help the British", based on alleged praise of the British Empire during a visit to his headquarters, little evidence that Hitler wanted to let the Allies escape exists apart from a self-exculpatory statement by Hitler himself in 1945. The historian Brian Bond wrote:

Few historians now accept the view that Hitler's behaviour was influenced by the desire to let the British off lightly in [the] hope that they would then accept a compromise peace. True, in his political testament dated 26 February 1945 Hitler lamented that Churchill was "quite unable to appreciate the sporting spirit" in which he had refrained from annihilating [the] British Expeditionary Force, at Dunkirk, but this hardly squares with the contemporary record. Directive No. 13, issued by the Supreme Headquarters on 24 May called specifically for the annihilation of the French, English and Belgian forces in the pocket, while the Luftwaffe was ordered to prevent the escape of the English forces across the channel.

Whatever the reasons for Hitler's decision, the Germans confidently believed the Allied troops were doomed. American journalist William Shirer reported on 25 May, "German military circles here tonight put it flatly. They said the fate of the great Allied army bottled up in Flanders is sealed." BEF commander General Lord Gort, commander-in-chief (C-in-C) of the BEF, agreed, writing to Anthony Eden, "I must not conceal from you that a great part of the BEF and its equipment will inevitably be lost in the best of circumstances".

Hitler did not rescind the Halt Order until the evening of 26 May. The three days thus gained gave a vital breathing space to the Royal Navy to arrange the evacuation of the British and Allied troops. About 338,000 men were rescued in about 11 days. Of these some 215,000 were British and 123,000 were French, of whom 102,250 escaped in British ships.

== Battle ==
=== "Fight back to the west" ===
Map of the battle

On 26 May, Anthony Eden told Gort that he might need to "fight back to the west", and ordered him to prepare plans for the evacuation, but without telling the French or the Belgians. Gort had foreseen the order and preliminary plans were already in hand. The first such plan, for a defence along the Lys Canal, could not be carried out because of German advances on 26 May, with the 2nd and 50th Divisions pinned down, and the 1st, 5th and 48th Divisions under heavy attack. The 2nd Division took heavy casualties trying to keep a corridor open, being reduced to brigade strength, but they succeeded; the 1st, 3rd, 4th and 42nd Divisions escaped along the corridor that day, as did about one-third of the French First Army. As the Allies fell back, they disabled their artillery and vehicles and destroyed their stores.

On 27 May, the British fought back to the Dunkirk perimeter line. The Le Paradis massacre took place that day, when the 3rd SS Division Totenkopf machine-gunned 97 British and French prisoners near the La Bassée Canal. The British prisoners were from the 2nd Battalion, Royal Norfolk Regiment, part of the 4th Brigade of the 2nd Division. The SS men lined them up against the wall of a barn and shot them all; only two survived. Meanwhile, the Luftwaffe dropped bombs and leaflets on the Allied armies. The leaflets showed a map of the situation. They read, in English and French: "British soldiers! Look at the map: it gives your true situation! Your troops are entirely surrounded—stop fighting! Put down your arms!" To the land- and air-minded Germans, the sea seemed an impassable barrier, so they believed the Allies were surrounded; but the British saw the sea as a route to safety.

Besides the Luftwaffe's bombs, German heavy artillery (which had just come within range) also fired high-explosive shells into Dunkirk. By this time, over 1,000 civilians in the town had been killed. This bombardment continued until the evacuation was over.

=== Battle of Wytschaete ===
Gort had sent Lieutenant General Ronald Adam, commanding III Corps, ahead to build the defensive perimeter around Dunkirk; his corps command passed to Lieutenant General Sydney Rigby Wason from the GHQ staff. Lieutenant General Alan Brooke, commanding II Corps, was to conduct a holding action with the 3rd, 4th, 5th, and 50th Divisions along the Ypres-Comines canal as far as Yser, while the rest of the BEF fell back. The battle of Wytschaete, over the border in Belgium, was the toughest action Brooke faced in this role.

On 26 May, the Germans made a reconnaissance in force against the British position. At mid-day on 27 May, they launched a full-scale attack with three divisions south of Ypres. A confused battle followed, where visibility was low because of forested or urban terrain and communications were poor because the British at that time used no radios below battalion level and the telephone wires had been cut. The Germans used infiltration tactics to get among the British, who were beaten back.

The heaviest fighting was in the 5th Division's sector. Still on 27 May, Brooke ordered the 3rd Division commander, Major-General Bernard Montgomery, to extend his division's line to the left, thereby freeing the 10th and 11th Brigades, both of the 4th Division, to join the 5th Division at Messines Ridge. The 10th Brigade arrived first, to find the enemy had advanced so far they were closing on the British field artillery. Between them, the 10th and 11th Brigades cleared the ridge of Germans, and by 28 May they were securely dug in east of Wytschaete.

That day, Brooke ordered a counterattack. This was to be spearheaded by two battalions, the 3rd Grenadier Guards and 2nd North Staffordshire Regiment, both of Major-General Harold Alexander's 1st Division. The North Staffords advanced as far as the Leie River, while the Grenadiers reached the canal itself, but could not hold it. The counterattack disrupted the Germans, holding them back a little longer while the BEF retreated.

=== Action at Poperinge ===
The route back from Brooke's position to Dunkirk passed through the town of Poperinge (known to most British sources as "Poperinghe"), where there was a bottleneck at a bridge over the Yser canal. Most of the main roads in the area converged on that bridge. On 27 May, the Luftwaffe bombed the resulting traffic jam thoroughly for two hours, destroying or immobilising about 80 percent of the vehicles. Another Luftwaffe raid, on the night of 28–29 May, was illuminated by flares as well as the light from burning vehicles. The British 44th Division in particular had to abandon many guns and lorries, losing almost all of them between Poperinge and the Mont.

The German 6th Panzer Division could probably have destroyed the 44th Division at Poperinge on 29 May, thereby cutting off the 3rd and 50th Divisions as well. The historian and author Julian Thompson calls it "astonishing" that they did not, but they were distracted, investing the nearby town of Cassel.

=== Belgian surrender ===
Gort had ordered Lieutenant General Adam, commanding III Corps, and French General Fagalde to prepare a perimeter defence of Dunkirk. The perimeter was semicircular, with French troops manning the western sector and British troops the eastern. It ran along the Belgian coastline from Nieuwpoort in the east via Veurne, Bulskamp and Bergues to Gravelines in the west. The line was made as strong as possible under the circumstances. On 28 May the Belgian army fighting on the Lys river under the command of King Leopold III surrendered. This left a 20 mi (32 km) gap in Gort's eastern flank between the British and the sea. The British were surprised by the Belgian capitulation, despite King Leopold warning them in advance. As a constitutional monarch, Leopold's decision to surrender without consulting the Belgian government led to his condemnation by the Belgian and French Prime Ministers, Hubert Pierlot and Paul Reynaud. Gort sent the battle-worn 3rd, 4th and 50th Divisions into the line to fill the space the Belgians had held.

=== Defence of the perimeter ===
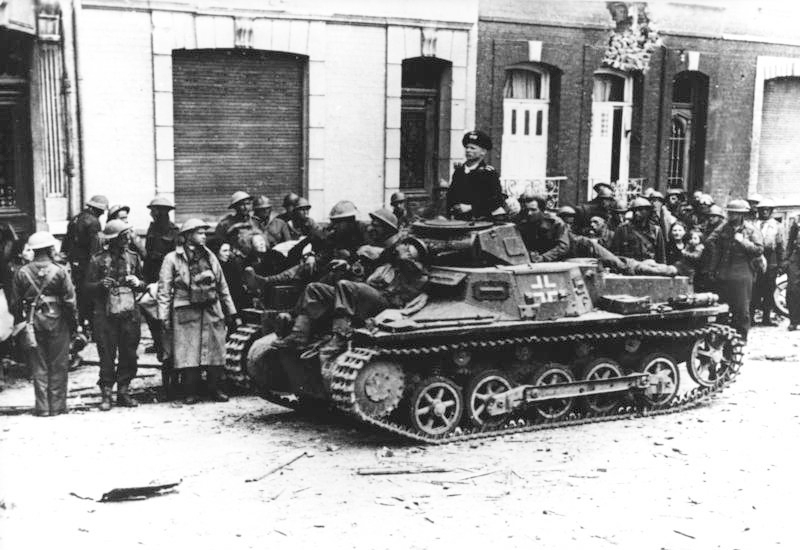
British prisoners of war with a Panzer I German tank

While the 3rd, 4th and 50th Divisions were still moving into position, they ran headlong into the German 256th Division, which was trying to outflank Gort's forces. Armoured cars of the 12th Royal Lancers stopped the Germans at Nieuwpoort itself. A confused battle raged all along the perimeter throughout 28 May. Command and control on the British side disintegrated, and the German forces drove the perimeter inwards toward Dunkirk.

Meanwhile, Erwin Rommel had surrounded five divisions of the French First Army near Lille. Although completely cut off and heavily outnumbered, the French fought on for four days under General Molinié in the Siege of Lille, thereby keeping seven German divisions from the assault on Dunkirk and saving an estimated 100,000 Allied troops. In recognition of the garrison's stubborn defence, after its surrender, German general Kurt Waeger granted them the honours of war, saluting the French troops as they marched past in parade formation with rifles shouldered.

The Dunkirk defensive perimeter held until the end of May, with the Allies falling back by degrees. Early on 31 May, German units nearly broke through at Nieuwpoort. The situation was so desperate that two British battalion commanders manned a Bren gun, with one colonel firing and the other loading. A few hours later, British troops were routed near Furnes. The 2nd Battalion, Coldstream Guards of the 3rd Division, rushed to reinforce the line. The Guards restored order by shooting some of the fleeing troops and turning others around at bayonet point. The British troops returned to the line and beat back the German assault.

In the afternoon, German units breached the perimeter near the canal at Bulskamp, but the boggy ground on the far side of the canal and sporadic fire from the Durham Light Infantry halted them. As night fell, the Germans massed for another attack at Nieuwpoort. Eighteen RAF bombers found the Germans while they were still assembling and scattered them with an accurate bombing run.

=== Retreat to Dunkirk ===
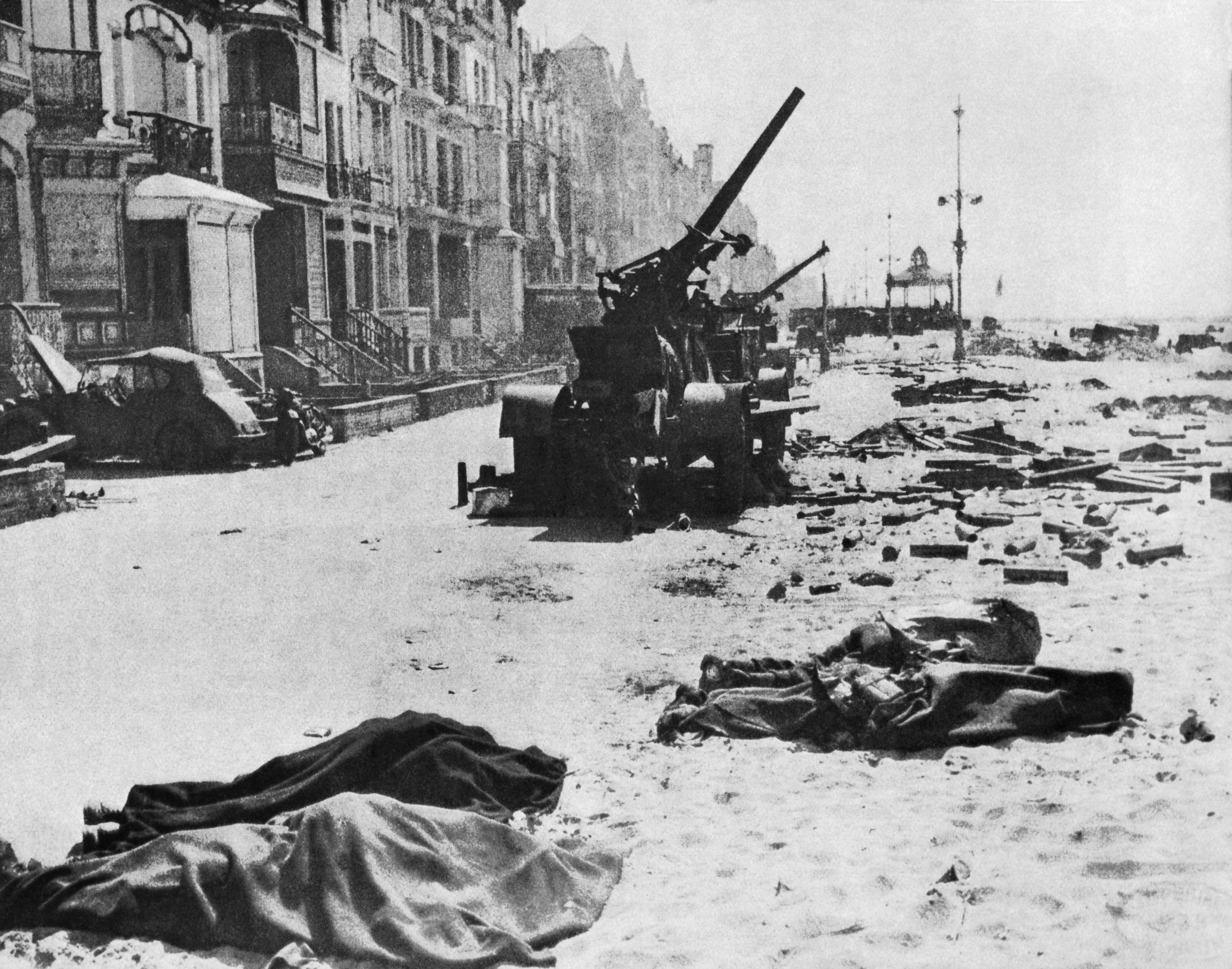
British anti-aircraft guns lie abandoned at Dunkirk in May 1940

Also on 31 May, General von Küchler assumed command of all the German forces at Dunkirk. His plan was simple: launch an all-out attack across the whole front at 11:00 on 1 June. Strangely, von Küchler ignored a radio intercept telling him the British were abandoning the eastern end of the line to fall back to Dunkirk itself. During the night of 31 May to 1 June, Marcus Ervine-Andrews won the Victoria Cross in the battle when he defended 1,000 yards (910 m) of territory.

The morning of 1 June was clear—good flying weather, in contrast to the bad weather that had hindered air operations on 30 and 31 May (there were only two-and-a-half good flying days in the whole operation). Although Churchill had promised the French that the British would cover their escape, on the ground it was mostly the French who held the line whilst the last remaining British and then French soldiers were evacuated. The outnumbered French and British defenders endured concentrated German artillery fire and Luftwaffe strafing and bombing and stood their ground. On 2 June (the day the last of the British units embarked onto the ships), (Note: Major General Harold Alexander, commanding I Corps, was one of the last to leave. Just before midnight on 2 June, Ramsay received the signal: "BEF evacuated".) the French began to fall back slowly, and by 3 June the Germans were about 2 miles (3.2 km) from Dunkirk. The night of 3 June was the last night of evacuations. At 10:20 on 4 June, the Germans hoisted the swastika over the docks from which so many British and French troops had escaped.

The resistance of Allied forces, especially French forces such as the French 12th Motorised Infantry Division from the Fort des Dunes, had bought time for the evacuation of hundreds of thousands of troops. The Wehrmacht captured some 35,000 soldiers, almost all of them French. These men had protected the evacuation until the last moment and were unable to embark. The survivors of the French 12th Motorised Infantry Division (composed in particular of the French 150th Infantry Regiment) were taken prisoner on the morning of 4 June on the beach of Malo-les-Bains. The flag of this regiment was burnt so as not to fall into enemy hands.

== Evacuation ==
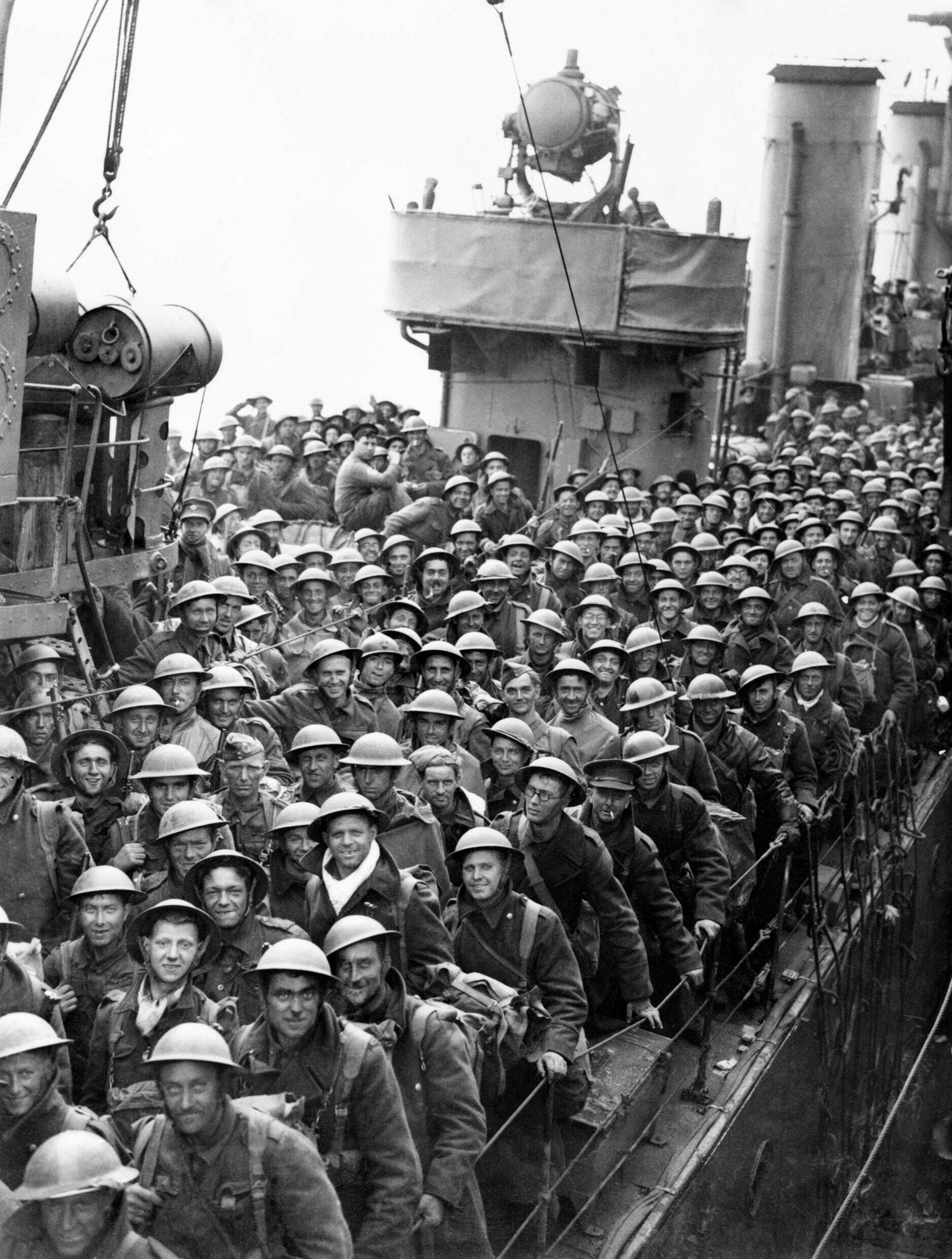
Evacuated British troops at Dover, 29 May 1940

The War Office made the decision to evacuate British forces on 25 May. In the nine days from 27 May to 4 June 338,226 men escaped, including 139,997 French, Polish, and Belgian troops, together with a small number of Dutch soldiers, aboard 861 vessels (of which 243 were sunk during the operation). B. H. Liddell Hart wrote that Fighter Command lost 106 aircraft over Dunkirk and the Luftwaffe lost about 135, some of which were shot down by the French Navy and the Royal Navy. MacDonald wrote in 1986 that the British losses were 177 aircraft and German losses 240.

The docks at Dunkirk were too badly damaged to be used, but the east and west moles (sea walls protecting the harbour entrance) were intact. Captain William Tennant—in charge of the evacuation—decided to use the east mole to load the ships. This decision increased the number of troops that could be embarked each day, and on 31 May, more than 68,000 men were embarked from the harbour and the beaches.

The last of the British Army left on 3 June, and at 10:50, Tennant signalled Ramsay to say "Operation completed. Returning to Dover". Churchill insisted on the Royal Navy going back for trapped French soldiers, and the Royal Navy returned on 4 June to rescue as many as possible of the French rearguard. More than 26,000 French soldiers were evacuated on that last day. Between 30,000 and 40,000 others were left behind in the Dunkirk perimeter and captured by the Germans. According to author Sean Longden, between 40,000 and 41,000 British soldiers were taken prisoner. Around 16,000 French soldiers and 1,000 British soldiers died during the evacuation. 90% of the city of Dunkirk was destroyed during the battle.

== Aftermath ==
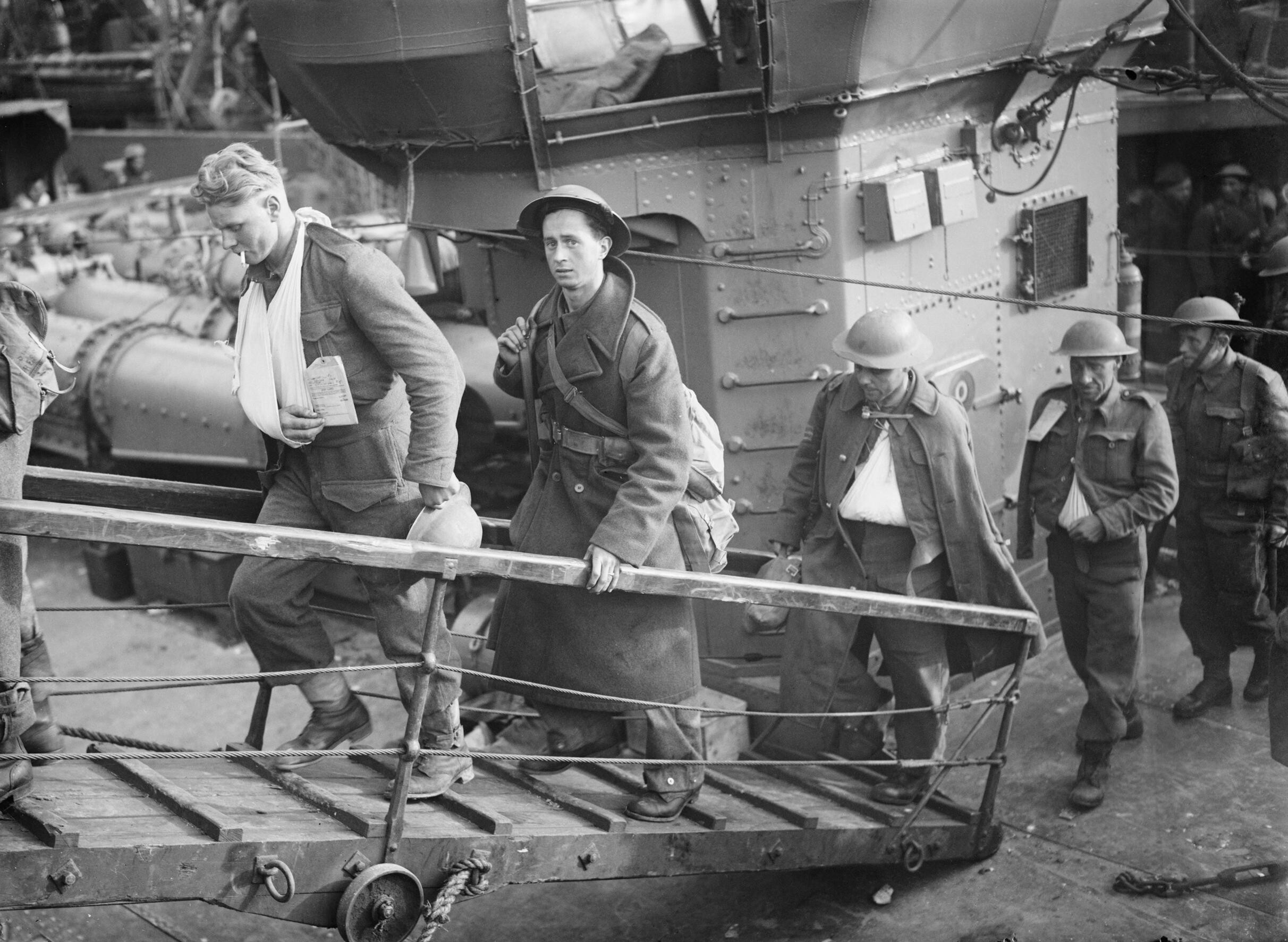
Troops evacuated from Dunkirk at Dover, 31 May 1940

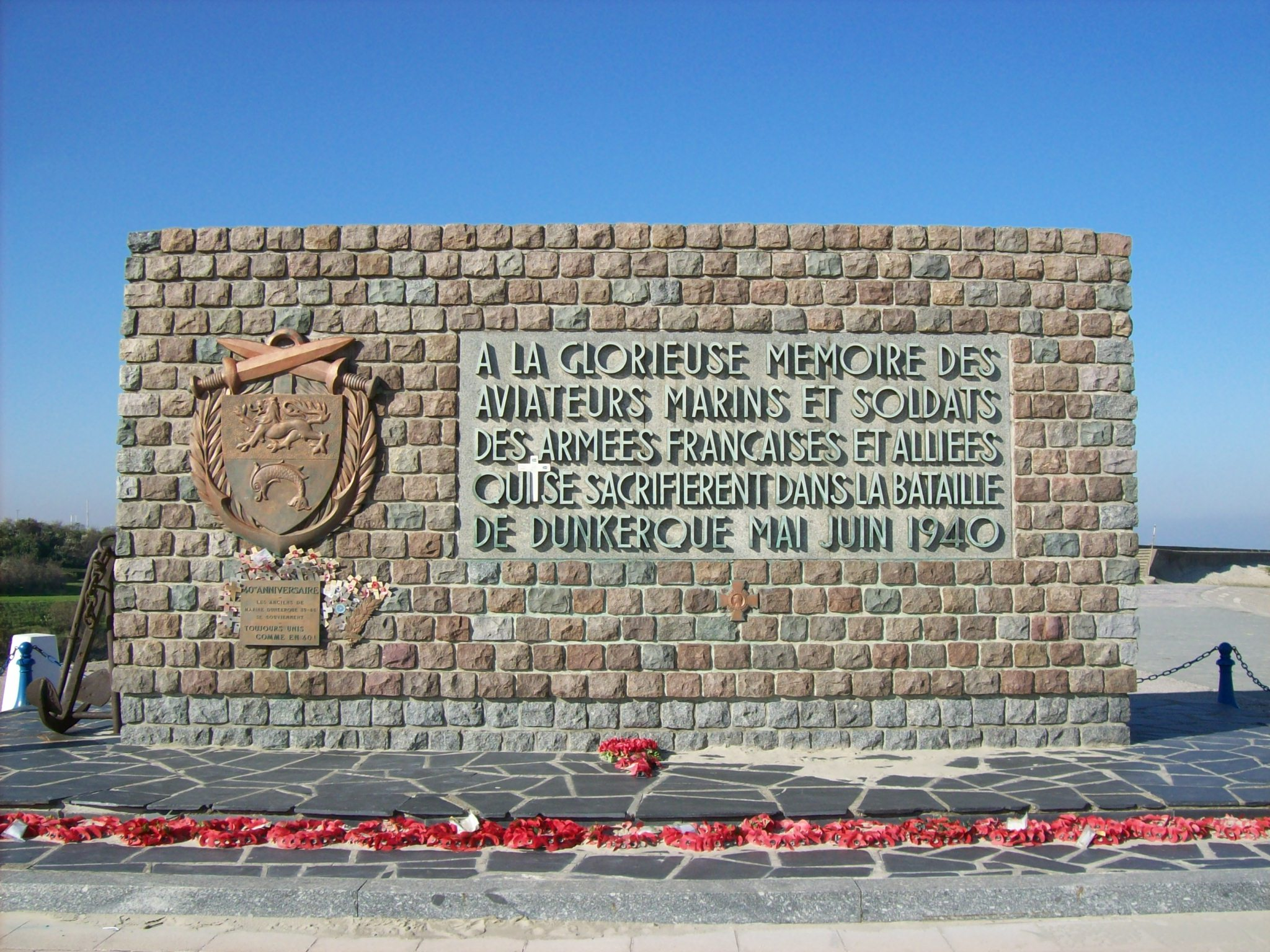
Battle of Dunkirk memorial

Following the events at Dunkirk, the German forces regrouped before commencing operation Fall Rot, a renewed assault southward, starting on 5 June. French soldiers evacuated from Dunkirk were landed in other parts of France a few hours later to try to stop the German advance. Two fresh British divisions were moving to France in an attempt to form a Second BEF. But British war leaders decided on 14 June to withdraw all remaining British troops, an evacuation called Operation Aerial.

By 25 June, almost 192,000 Allied personnel, 144,000 of them British, had been evacuated through various French ports. Although the French Army fought on, German troops entered Paris on 14 June. The French government agreed to an armistice at Compiègne on 22 June.

The loss of British and French materiel on the beaches was enormous. The British Army left enough equipment behind to fit out about eight to ten divisions. Discarded in France were, among other things, huge supplies of ammunition, 880 field guns, 310 guns of large calibre, some 500 anti-aircraft guns, about 850 anti-tank guns, 11,000 machine guns, nearly 700 tanks, 20,000 motorcycles and 45,000 motor cars and lorries. Officers told troops falling back from Dunkirk to burn or otherwise disable their trucks (so as not to let them benefit the advancing German forces).

Army equipment available at home was only just sufficient to equip two divisions. The British Army needed months to re-supply properly, and some planned introductions of new types of equipment were halted while industrial resources concentrated on making good the losses. The shortage of army vehicles after Dunkirk was so severe that the Royal Army Service Corps (RASC) was reduced to retrieving and refurbishing obsolete buses and coaches from British scrapyards to press them into use as troop transports. Some of these antique workhorses were still in use as late as the North African campaign of 1942.

On 2 June, the Dean of St Paul's, Walter Matthews, was the first to call the evacuation the "Miracle of Dunkirk".

During the following week papers were filled with letters from readers making an obvious association. It was remembered that the Archbishop of Canterbury had announced that the Day of National Prayer might well be a turning point, and it was obvious to many that God had answered the nation's collective prayer with the 'miracle of Dunkirk'. The evidence of God's intervention was clear for those who wished to see it; papers had written of calm seas and the high mist which interfered with the accuracy of German bombers.

— Duncan Anderson

A marble memorial to the battle stands at Dunkirk. The French inscription is translated as: "To the glorious memory of the pilots, mariners, and soldiers of the French and Allied armies who sacrificed themselves in the Battle of Dunkirk, May–June 1940." The missing dead of the BEF are commemorated on the Dunkirk Memorial erected by the Commonwealth War Graves Commission.

After Dunkirk, a considerable number of British troops were in positions in France to the south of the River Somme. These included some 140,000 men, mostly logistic support and lines-of-communications troops, but also including the 51st (Highland) Division and the remnants of the 1st Armoured Division. On 2 June, Lieutenant General Brooke was ordered back to France to form a Second BEF together with two further infantry divisions to follow, a project which Brooke said was doomed to failure.

Most of the 51st Division was cut off at St Valery-en-Caux on the Channel coast and surrendered. Learning of this, Brooke spoke to Churchill by telephone on 14 June and persuaded him to allow the evacuation of all the remaining British forces in France. In Operation Aerial, 144,171 British, 18,246 French, 24,352 Polish and 1,939 Czech troops were embarked in ships at several major ports along the west coast of France and returned to England, along with much of their equipment. The only major mishap was the sinking of the RMS Lancastria with the loss of 3,500 to 7,000 people (of whom at least 1,000 were civilians). The last British troops left France on 25 June, the day the French Armistice came into force.

== "Dunkirk Spirit" ==
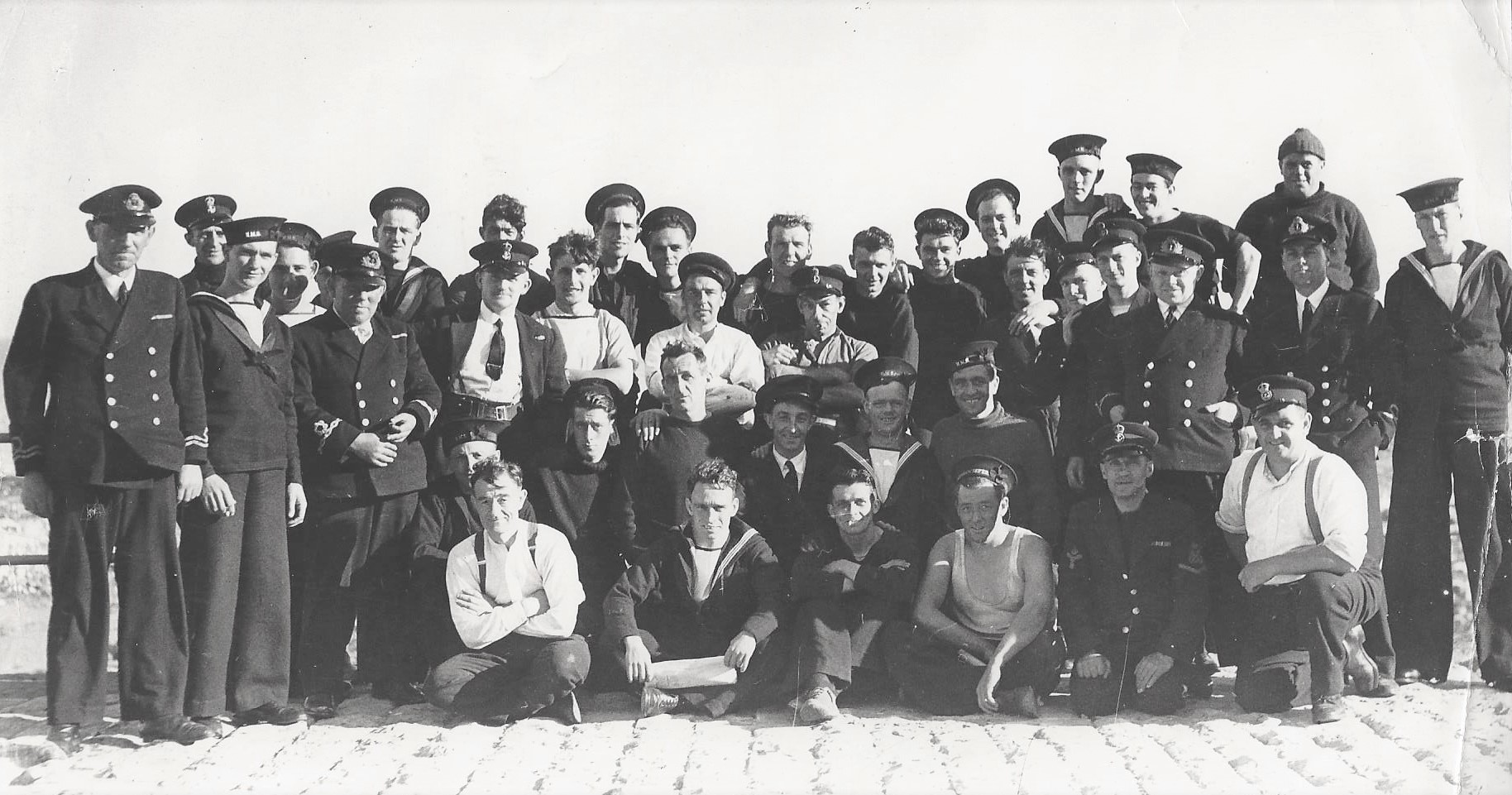
Sailors involved in the evacuation with survivors from King Orry

British press later exploited the successful evacuation of Dunkirk in 1940, and particularly the role of the "Dunkirk little ships", very effectively. Many of them were private vessels such as fishing boats and pleasure cruisers, but commercial vessels such as ferries also contributed to the force, including a number from as far away as the Isle of Man and Glasgow. These smaller vessels—guided by naval craft across the Channel from the Thames Estuary and from Dover—assisted in the official evacuation. Being able to move closer into the beachfront shallows than larger craft, the "little ships" acted as shuttles to and from the larger ships, lifting troops who were queuing in the water, many waiting shoulder-deep in water for hours. The term "Dunkirk Spirit" refers to the solidarity of the British people in times of adversity.

== Dunkirk Medal ==
A commemorative medal was established in 1960 by the French National Association of Veterans of the Fortified Sector of Flanders and Dunkirk on behalf of the town of Dunkirk. The medal was initially awarded only to the French defenders of Dunkirk, but in 1970 the qualification was expanded to include British forces who served in the Dunkirk sector and their rescue forces, including the civilians who volunteered to man the "little ships".

The design of the bronze medal included the arms of the town of Dunkirk on one side, and "Dunkerque 1940" on the reverse side.

== See also ==
- 1940 Dunkirk Veterans' Association
