= Birhan Nebebew =

Ethiopian long-distance runner

Birhan Tesfaye Nebebew (born 14 August 1994) is an Ethiopian male long-distance runner who competes in track, road and cross country running.

He first emerged on the road with runner-up finishes at the 2012 Rennes 10K and Istanbul 15K. He won the latter race the following year. His international debut came at the 2013 IAAF World Cross Country Championships, where he placed sixth and shared in the team gold. He gained selection with a runner-up finish in the junior section at the Jan Meda Cross Country behind Hagos Gebrhiwet.

Birhan had four wins on the professional circuit in 2014: two French cross country races, Cross de l'Acier and Cross Ouest-France, and two American road races, the Cooper River Bridge Run and Hy-Vee Road Races. He received his first senior national call-up that year but failed to finish the 10,000 metres at the 2014 African Championships in Athletics. After a quiet 2015, he was runner-up at the 2016 Ethiopian Cross Country Championships and took tenth and a team bronze medal at the 2016 African Cross Country Championships.

== International competitions ==
Year	Competition	Venue	Position	Event	Notes
2013	World Cross Country Championships	Bydgoszcz, Poland	6th	Junior race	21:42
2013	World Cross Country Championships	Bydgoszcz, Poland	1st	Junior team	23 pts
2014	African Championships	Marrakesh, Morocco	—	10,000 m	DNF
2016	African Cross Country Championships	Yaoundé, Cameroon	10th	Senior race	27:48
2016	African Cross Country Championships	Yaoundé, Cameroon	3rd	Senior team	41 pts
2020	Xiamen International Marathon	Xiamen, China	1st	Marathon	2:08:16

== Circuit wins ==
- Cross de l'Acier: 2014
- Cross Ouest-France: 2014
- Cooper River Bridge Run: 2014
- Hy-Vee Road Races: 2014
- Istanbul 15K: 2013
