= Fort des Dunes =

Museum in France

- Part of Fortifications of Dunkerque, Séré de Rivières system
- Leffrinckoucke, France
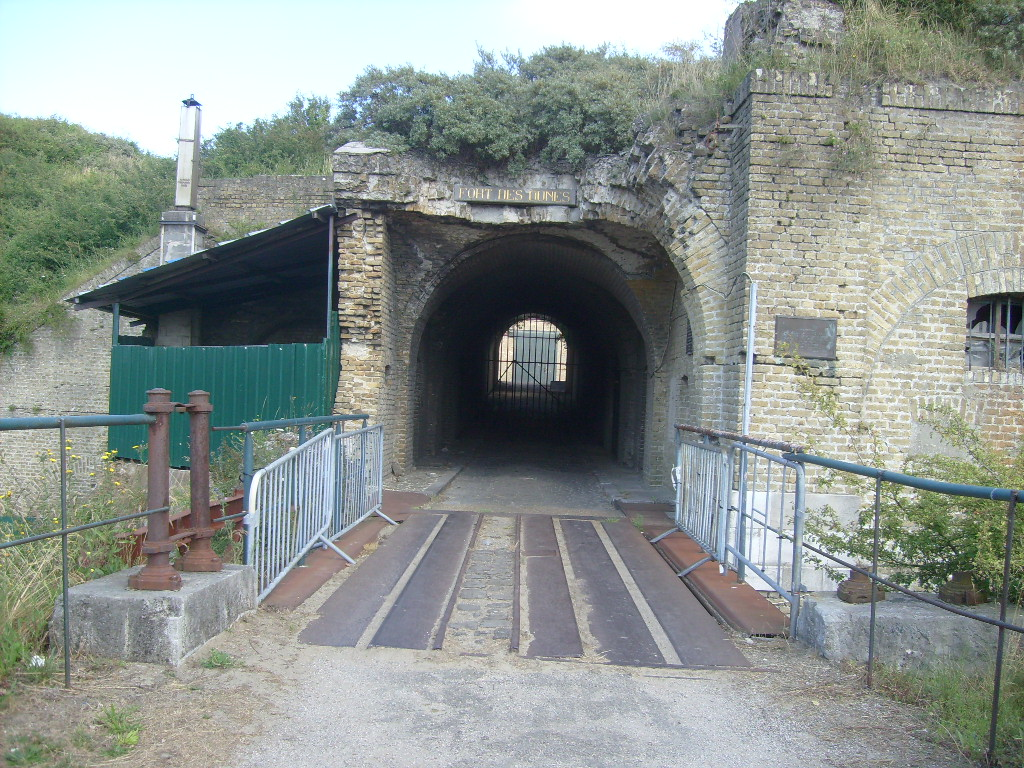

Site information
- Type: Fort
- Owner: Commune of Leffrinckoucke
- Controlled by: France
- Open to the public: Yes

Location
- Location within France
- Coordinates: 51.05335°N 2.44711°E

Site history
- Built: 1878
- Materials: Masonry, concrete
- Battles/wars: Battle of Dunkirk, Battle of France, Siege of Dunkirk (1944)

The Fort des Dunes, also known as Fort Leffrinckoucke and sometime Fort de l'Est, is located in the commune of Leffrinckoucke, France, about 6 kilometres (3.7 mi) east of Dunkirk (Dunkerque). Built from 1878 to 1880, it is part of the Séré de Rivières system of fortifications that France built following the defeat of the Franco-Prussian War. Although it played no part in World War I, it had a significant role in both the beginning and end of World War II. It has been preserved and is interpreted by a local preservation association for the public.

== Description ==
The Fort des Dunes was built as the westernmost frontier fort in the Séré de Rivières system, in the coastal sand dunes within a few hundred metres of the English Channel. The chosen site was both served by and a place of protection for the coastal railway and canal. It occupies a sandy hill 27 metres (89 ft) high, and is itself protected by as many as 6 metres (20 ft) of sand cover. The rectangular fort is surrounded by a dry moat defended by caponiers that provide a protected firing position to sweep the length of the ditch with gunfire. The main fort is accessed by a drawbridge over the ditch. The Fort des Dunes was armed with a variety of artillery over its history, initially mounted on the fort's surface. The fort's barracks and service areas are recessed into the surface and covered with soil and turf. The walls are built of brick and stone masonry. It was initially armed with about 25 artillery pieces, served by 451 men.

The Fort des Dunes was a component of a larger system of coastal batteries and outlying positions defending the greater Dunkirk area. These fortifications were modified as artillery technology developed, making fixed open-air gun emplacements untenable. During World War I the fort's primary armament was two or three 90mm guns on the ramparts. Several 120mm anti-aircraft guns were positioned in the area surrounding the fort.

== History ==
The Fort des Dunes did not see action during the First World War, since it was well behind the lines. It was garrisoned largely by reservists. The fort's primary function during this time was as a munitions depot.

=== Operation Dynamo ===
During the Battle of France in 1940, large numbers of French and British troops arrived in the Dunkirk area, separated from their units. The Camp des Dunes was established at the fort to process French soldiers and to assign them duties. General Georges Blanchard, whose First French Army had effectively ceased to exist, arrived at the fort on 30 May. The fort became the headquarters of the French 12th Motorized Infantry Division on 1 June. On 2 June the fort was attacked by aircraft. Two bombs exploded in the courtyard of the fort. Among the dead was the 12th Motorized Infantry's General Janssen. Another bombing raid on 3 June hit the fort with six bombs, heavily damaging the fort and killing six more officers, with a total of between 150 and 200 killed at the fort in both raids. The repeated attacks and heavy damage led the 12th Division to leave the fort.

Following the last evacuations from the beaches and port of Dunkirk on 4 June, German forces took possession of the fort. The Germans made repairs to the fort and organized reburials of soldiers who had been interred where they had fallen or who had been entombed by debris, mostly carried out by local citizens and prisoners of war. The fort became a component of the German Atlantic Wall fortifications, primarily as an annex to the Zuydcoote battery. Apart from functioning as a rations depot, the fort supported an anti-aircraft battery with a radar installation. A small blockhouse was built by the Todt Organization on the west side, with another bunker covering the approach road. These were reinforced in 1944 with temporary revetments and a heavy machine gun position. German troops left significant murals and decorations in the magazines and barracks.

=== 1944 ===
On 4 September 1944 an attempt to kill a German soldier was made by the French Resistance in Rosendäel. The house that the assailant fled to was surrounded and the occupants arrested. All eight were held at the Fort des Dunes, except for Daniel Decroos, who had been killed while trying to escape. Another detainee had been wounded by an exploding grenade. On 6 September six detainees were executed by firing squad in the north ditch and the wounded detainee was euthanized. The seven were buried next to the ramparts. The wall where the prisoners had been shot was destroyed and collapsed on the graves. Following the Liberation the execution was investigated and the graves discovered. The remains were exhumed and reinterred.

German forces held the Dunkirk Pocket through the Siege of Dunkirk to the end of the war, when they surrendered. 10,000 Germans were taken prisoner on 9 May 1945. 3,700 Germans were kept in the Dunkirk area, with many at the Fort des Dunes. The prisoners were engaged in cleanup and mine removal. After the departure of the prisoners the fort was transferred to the customs service, who used it as a storage centre for seized goods. A customs officer and his family lived at the fort. The fort went back to the army in 1955, which began excavations to recover the remains of those killed in 1940. A ceremony of re-interment was held in August 1955, attended by the widow of General Janssen. The fort was then abandoned for twenty years. In 1978 a local organization was formed to preserve the fort as a center for military reserve functions. By 1990 the fort had been made habitable.

== Present ==
The fort is maintained and interpreted by the Association Fort des Dunes. It is usually open to the public on summer weekends. It was transferred to the commune of Leffrinckoucke in 1998. The fort still shows the scars of the 1940 bombardment, with the entry tunnel largely exposed.
