= Muliye Dekebo =

Ethiopian long-distance runner

Personal information
- Nationality: Ethiopian
- Born: 13 March 1998 (age 28) Ethiopia
- Occupation: Long-distance runner
- Years active: 2017–present

Sport
- Sport: Athletics
- Event(s): Marathon, Half marathon

Achievements and titles
- Personal bests: 10 km road: 32:25 (Rome 2019); Half marathon: 1:07:57 (Ostia 2019); Marathon: 2:18:43 (Dubai 2026)
Medal record
Athletics
Representing Ethiopia
World Athletics Label Road Races
Silver medal – second place	2026 Dubai	Marathon
Bronze medal – third place	2017 Ostia	Half marathon

Muliye Dekebo Haylemariam (born 13 March 1998) is an Ethiopian long-distance runner specializing in the marathon and half marathon. She is a prominent competitor on the international road racing circuit and a podium finisher at the Dubai Marathon.

== Career ==
Muliye Dekebo began her international career as a teenager, debuting at the 2017 Roma-Ostia Half Marathon where she finished third in 1:09:10. She moved up to the marathon distance in 2018, placing tenth at the Dubai Marathon in 2:25:35.

In 2019, sheestablished herself as a top-tier road runner, setting a lifetime best in the half marathon of 1:07:57 and a 10 km best of 32:25 in Italy.

On 1 February 2026, she competed in the 25th anniversary edition of the Dubai Marathon. In a fast race that saw the leaders pass the half-way mark in 69:27, ahe assumed control in the final section and appeared to be the likely winner. However, with just over two kilometres remaining, she was hampered by sudden stomach distress at a drinks station, allowing fellow Ethiopian Anchinalu Dessie to take the lead. She recovered to finish second in a personal best of 2:18:43, completing a clean sweep of the podium for Ethiopia.

== Achievements ==
Year	Race	Place	Position	Time
2017	Rome-Ostia Half Marathon	Ostia	3rd	1:09:10
2018	Dubai Marathon	Dubai	10th	2:25:35
2019	Rome-Ostia Half Marathon	Ostia	4th	1:07:57
2026	Dubai Marathon	Dubai	2nd	2:18:43
