= Eleni Gebrehiwot =

German long-distance runner

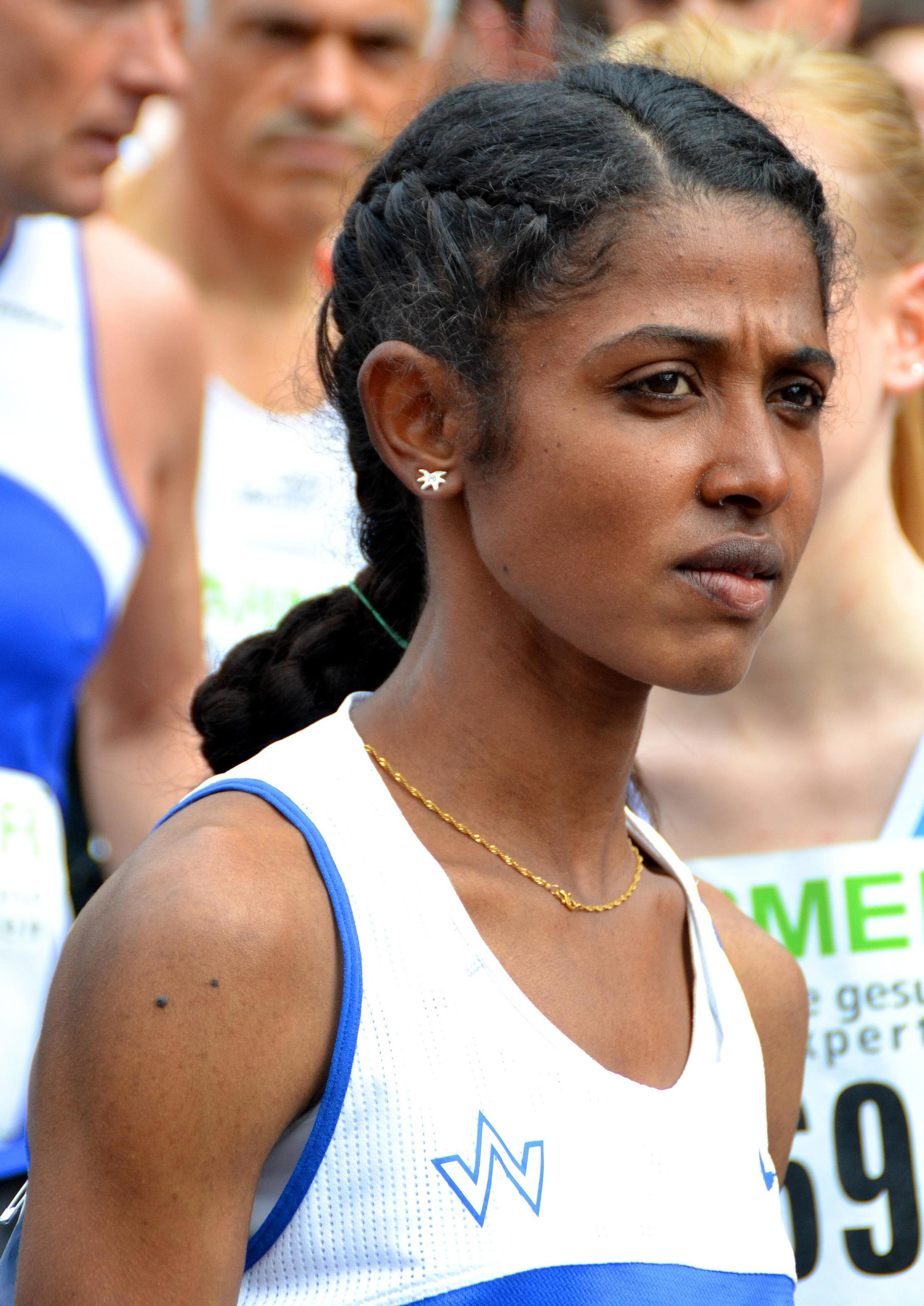
Eleni Gebrehiwot in 2013

Eleni Gebrehiwot (born 3 August 1984 in Asmara, Ethiopia) is a German long-distance runner.

She became German citizen in 2014.

On 8 September 2014 she won the 12 edition of the Münster Marathon in record time of 2:29:12 h. It was also the fulfilment of the qualification time for the 2014 European Athletics Championships in Zurich. However, she did not participate in this race because of problems with her right Achilles tendon.

== Personal bests ==
=== Outdoor ===
- 5000 m – 15:47.48 min, 16 June 2012, Wattenscheid
- 10.000 m – 32:26.92 min, 4 May 2013, Bremen
- 10 km (road) – 32:12 min, 30 March 2013, Paderborn
- Half marathon – 1:12:24 h, 2 October 2011, Cologne
- Marathon – 2:29:12 h, 8 September 2013, Münster
