= Leffrinckoucke =

- Commune
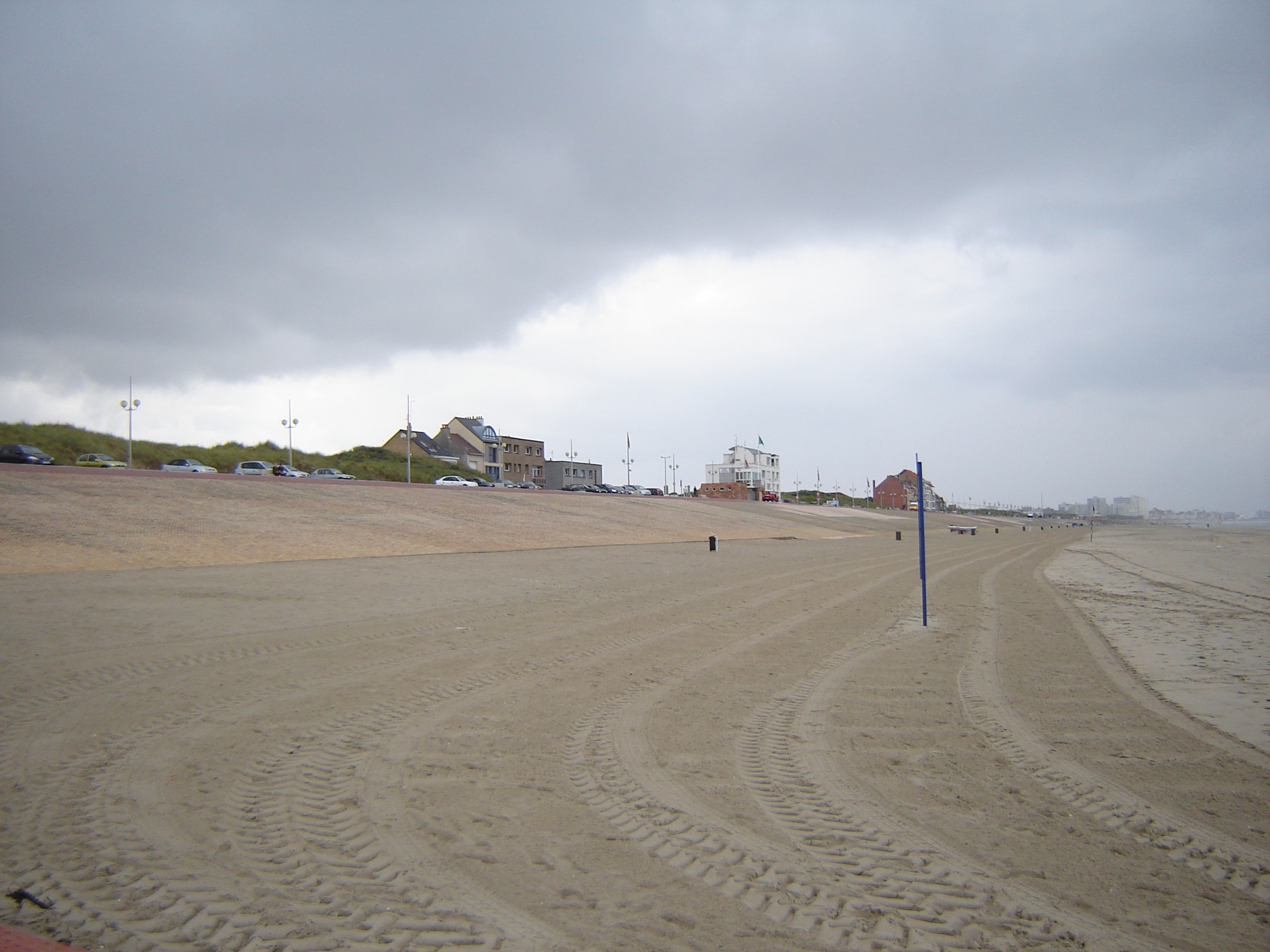
- The beach at Leffrinckoucke

- Coat of arms
- Location of Leffrinckoucke
- Location within France Location within Hauts-de-France
- Coordinates: 51°03′12″N 2°26′42″E
- Country: France
- Region: Hauts-de-France
- Department: Nord
- Arrondissement: Dunkerque
- Canton: Dunkerque-2
- Intercommunality: CU Dunkerque

Government
  - Mayor (2020–2026): Olivier Ryckebusch
- Area^{1}: 7.28 km^{2} (2.81 sq mi)
- Highest elevation: 23 m (75 ft)
- Lowest elevation: 0 m (0 ft)
- Population (2023): 4,078
  - Density: 560/km^{2} (1,450/sq mi)
- Demonym: Leffrinckouckois (es)
- Time zone: UTC+01:00 (CET)
  - Summer (DST): UTC+02:00 (CEST)
- INSEE/Postal code: 59340 /59495
- ^{1} French Land Register data, which excludes lakes, ponds, glaciers > 1 km^{2} (0.386 sq mi or 247 acres) and river estuaries.

Leffrinckoucke (French pronunciation: [ləfʁɛ̃kuk]; Dutch: Leffrinkhoeke; West Flemish: Leffrinkoeke) is a commune in the Nord department in northern France.

== Heraldry ==
Arms of Leffrinckoucke	The arms of Leffrinckoucke are blazoned : Chequy argent and azure, a toothed wheel sable pierced gules, above and between 2 stalks of wheat in saltire Or, on a chief wavy Or fimbriated azure, a lion passant sable armed and langued gules.

== Population ==
Historical population
Year	Pop.	±% p.a.
1968	3,192	—
1975	5,307	+7.53%
1982	5,244	−0.17%
1990	4,641	−1.52%
1999	4,949	+0.72%
2007	4,517	−1.14%
2012	4,411	−0.47%
2017	4,262	−0.68%
2023	4,078	−0.73%
Source: INSEE

== Twin towns ==
Leffrinckoucke is twinned with:

- Węgorzewo in Poland

== In popular culture ==
The end scenes of the film Rosalie Blum were filmed at Leffrinckoucke in May 2015.

== See also ==
- Communes of the Nord department
