= Margaret Kipkemboi =

Kenyan long-distance runner (born 1993)

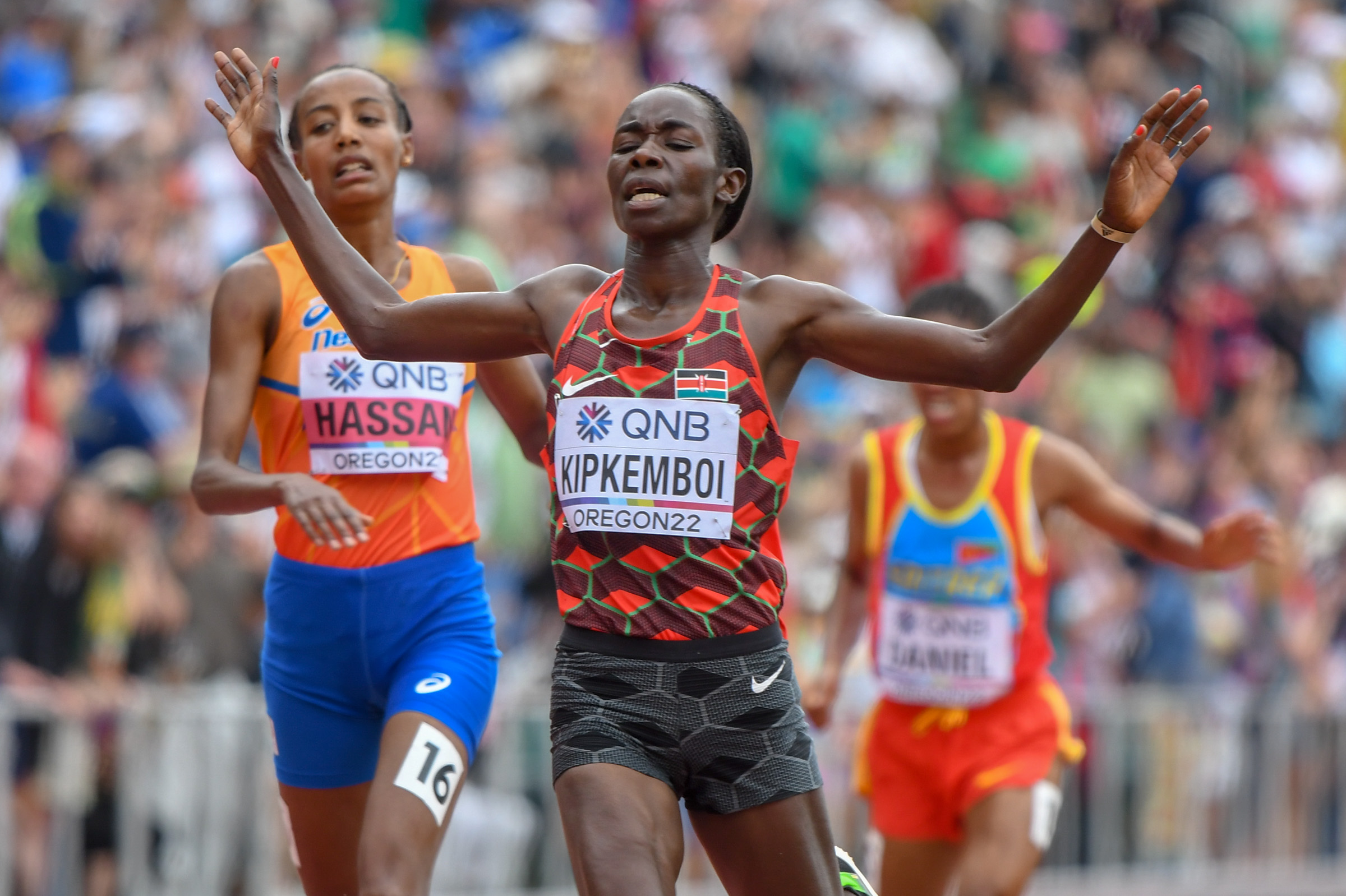
- Kipkemboi at the 2022 World Athletics Championships in Eugene

Personal information
- Full name: Margaret Chelimo Kipkemboi
- Born: 9 February 1993 (age 33) Nandi County, Kenya
- Weight: 49 kg (108 lb)

Sport
- Country: Kenya
- Sport: Athletics
- Event: Long-distance running
Medal record
Women's athletics
Representing Kenya
World Championships
Silver medal – second place	2019 Doha	5000 m
Bronze medal – third place	2022 Eugene	10,000 m
World Road Running Championships
Silver medal – second place	2023 Riga	Half marathon
Commonwealth Games
Silver medal – second place	2018 Gold Coast	5000 m
All-Africa Games
Gold medal – first place	2015 Brazzaville	5000 m
African Championships
Silver medal – second place	2016 Durban	5000 m

Margaret Chelimo Kipkemboi (born 9 February 1993) is a Kenyan long-distance runner. She won the silver medal for the 5000 metres at the 2019 World Championships and a bronze in the 10,000 metres at the 2022 World Championships. Kipkemboi took silver over the 5000 m at the 2018 Commonwealth Games.

== Competition record ==
Year	Competition	Venue	Position	Event	Time
Representing Kenya
2015	World Cross Country Championships	London, United Kingdom	13th	Senior race	27:32
2015	African Games	Brazzaville, Congo Republic	1st	5000 m	15:30.15
2016	African Championships	Durban, South Africa	2nd	5000 m	15:07.56
2017	World Championships	London, United Kingdom	5th	5000 m	14:48.74
2018	Commonwealth Games	Gold Coast, Australia	2nd	5000 m	15:15.28
2019	World Championships	Doha, Qatar	2nd	5000 m	14:27.49 PB
2022	World Championships	Eugene, OR, United States	4th	5000 m	14:47.71
2022	World Championships	Eugene, OR, United States	3rd	10,000 m	30:10.07 PB
2023	World Championships	Budapest, Hungary	4th	5000 m	14:56.62
2024	Olympic Games	Paris, France	5th	5000 m	14:32.23
2024	Olympic Games	Paris, France	4th	10,000 m	30:44.58
Road races
2022	Edreams Mitja Marató Barcelona	Barcelona, Spain	1st	Half marathon	1:05:26

== Personal bests ==
- 3000 metres – 8:21.53 (Paris 2021)
- 5000 metres – 14:23.67 (Paris 2023)
- 10,000 metres – 29:27.59 (Eugene 2024)

Road

- 5 km – 14:32 (Zürich 2021)
- 10 km – 29:50 (Valencia 2021)
- Half marathon – 65:26 (Barcelona 2022)
