= East and Central Africa Junior Athletics Championships =

- Participation: over 200 athletes from 10 nations

The East and Central Africa Junior Athletics Championships (EAAR), also just called the East Africa Junior Athletics Championships, is a track and field competition for junior athletes in East Africa and Central Africa.

The championships were held for the first time in Amaan Stadium, Zanzibar in 2013. They were then hosted by Dar es Salaam, Tanzania in 2016. They consisted of athletes from Kenya, Uganda, Rwanda, Somalia, Eritrea, Sudan, Ethiopia, Djibouti, Tanzania, and Zanzibar.

Kenyan athletes won 10 gold medals at the 2016 Championships.
