= Wateringue (drainage) =

Drainage structure

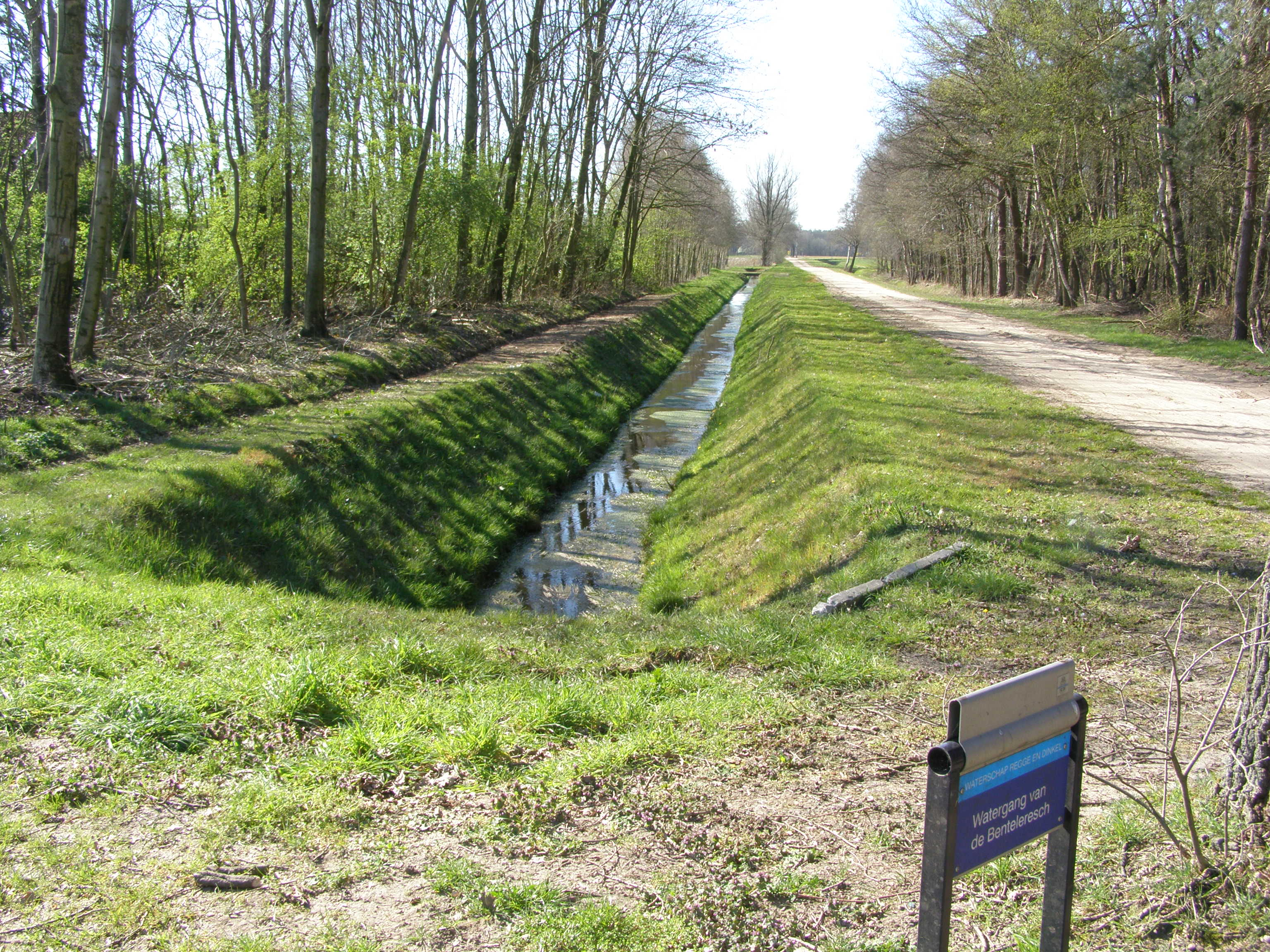
Model of a small wateringue, the size of a ditch, but with a flared profile allowing to increase the capacity and flow as the water rises; the vegetation protects it from erosion and the relatively gentle slope makes muskrats visible to predators or trappers.

A wateringue (also known as a watering or watergang) is a ditch or drainage structure designed to drain marshlands, wetlands, or flood-prone areas located in coastal plains below the level of high tides (polders), in the Netherlands, Belgium, and France.

In northern France, the term "les wateringues" can also refer to "a forced association of property owners", now known as the Intercommunal Institution of the Wateringues, which is responsible for managing interactions between freshwater and seawater.

== Etymology ==
"Wateringue" is a masculine or feminine term derived from the Dutch word "watering" (wetering), itself stemming from the word "water," meaning "water" in Dutch.

By metonymy, the word also describes the (sometimes compulsory) association of property owners who collectively finance the maintenance and operation of the drainage network. In northern France, the network is divided into "wateringue sections," whose members must maintain their network, with the assistance of the administration and subsidies from local authorities if necessary.

== Usage ==
Water is taken from these areas to be returned to the sea, either at low tide when the locks open, or by windmills that lift it (formerly in the Netherlands and Flanders) or more commonly today by electric pumps.

== History ==
The history of wateringues is closely linked to the history of polders.

=== Roman Era ===
The Morini inhabited a marshy and forested strip of land. Strabo indicates that they lived "on small islands and [placed] their huts on eminences formed in some places by nature and in others by the hand of men, and quite high so that the tides cannot reach them...". At the same time, he reports that "the ocean flows into the plain twice a day and makes one doubt if these places are indeed part of the mainland". Undoubtedly, it was due to these conditions that Caesar's Roman legions had great difficulty conquering this warlike people. Even after the victory, no embankment work was undertaken. Only a few roads were built to reach the sea at low tide. Perhaps it was also to have a buffer zone between Frisian and Saxon attacks? Their occupation is attested until the reign of Quintillus based on coins found during excavations. Their withdrawal was commanded by two events: the great flood of the 4th century, forcing them to retreat; and the Frankish invasion around 420.

=== Dunkirk Transgression ===
This would have occurred in the 4th century according to Gilbert Delaine, as there are no longer any traces of Frankish civilization. It can therefore be assumed that this transgression took place between the reign of Quintillus and that of the Franks. This transgression will make it possible to provide peat and polder clay, while smoothing the landscape. The rivers, especially the Aa, then flow through numerous gullies, later filled in. Thus, the Aa will carve out beds that will become the Colme, Bergues canal, and the Vliet, which will become the Bourbourg canal.

These transgressions continue from the 5th to the 7th century. The soil of the maritime plain reappears above sea level as it decreases, and dune ridges form, allowing water to pass only through openings. Gradually, the water, due to the tides, will slowly uncover the plains. It will take until the 12th century for the sea to remain only on the outskirts of Dunkirk.

=== Christianization of the Country ===
Several attempts were made. The first was in the 4th century by two priests from Rome, but they were driven out of the country. A century later, Saint Victrice, a converted soldier and bishop of Rouen, began the evangelization with success, but the Franks reduced his work to nothing. It will take until the 6th and 7th centuries for monastic institutions to settle, the first being in Thérouanne. Saint Omer, the bishop of Thérouanne, will say of Sithiu (now the city of Saint-Omer), "Basilica in insula Sithiu, ubi antea monasterium", which proves the insularity of Saint-Omer and that the drainage has not yet begun. Nevertheless, the spread of Christianity is rapid in Flanders thanks to Saint Mommelin, Saint Bertin, or even Saint Winoc. In fact, this Christianization will be mainly due to the ability of monks to cultivate marshy lands by draining them. But each time, this progress of cultivable land stops at the limit of the domain. People will follow these precepts and arrangements will be made to send water to one's neighbor, which will provoke many quarrels.

However, the floods of the Aa (freshwater) and the high tides (saltwater) as well as the Norman invasions prevented the expansion of these domains. During all this time, crops were only grown on high ground, perhaps some summer or occasional crops were grown on the lowest lands, covered by floods.

=== Counts of Flanders ===
Baldwin I, called "Iron Arm," inherited the county of Flanders by marrying the daughter of Charles the Bald. Norman invasions raged, but it would take about a hundred years, until the middle of the 10th century, for Baldwin III to be moved by acts of barbarism and fortify several towns where peasants came to take refuge. The central power having no power to maintain order, military leaders, governors, and counts raised armies to fight the enemies. The military leader is called a castellan, commanding the forces of neighboring lords to resist the Normans. This association gave birth to the châtellenie, the name given to the country dominated by the castellan, as well as to the confederation established under his orders. Castles and strongholds were then surrounded by fortified walls for the subordinate classes, places called bourg. The failure of central power allowed castellans to establish the feudal system. Around the beginning of the 11th century, when Norman invasions ceased, the ground sank and let in seawater. The plain is flooded again up to Saint-Omer.

These floods had the effect of raising the ground level through alluvial deposits. People resumed their embankment and drainage work by sending water gravitationally to the sea, or into collapses when the land was lower than the sea, thus forming large lakes (the moëres) which emitted pestilential odors and often caused epidemics.

In order to stimulate land drainage work, the counts of Flanders granted monastic institutions all the land gained by them from the sea. The first charter granting this right is that of Baldwin of Lille, who grants to the abbey of Saint-Winoc in Bergues "dunes, lands and privileges, with the right to obtain ownership [...] of the lands gained from the marshes that it could transform into arable or productive lands". Successors, including Robert of Flanders or Charles the Good, granted the same rights to other abbeys.

However, while the maritime plain dried up rapidly, the new owners, eager to obtain new lands, were not very careful about how they achieved their goals, often cutting off their neighbor's drainage network. Conflicts arose.

=== Philip of Alsace ===
This is how Philip of Alsace, Count of Flanders and Vermandois, looks at the situation. He looks at the problem in general, convinced that problems can only be solved on the scale of the entire maritime plain. His first act is to define the Terra Nova as "the land that has been withdrawn from the impetuosity of the sea and floods, by man and with his money". In 1169, he donated to the canons of Aire the lands located between Bergues and Watten, so that they could be drained. The canons then create a drainage canal between dikes, from Bergues to Watten, using one of the branches of the Aa. The Colme canal is born. Following some disputes over the validity of donations made by the charters of the Counts of Flanders, Philip of Alsace confirms these privileges. Finally, and in order to keep his lands dry, he creates an organization: the Waeteringues.

For the maintenance of the waeteringues, taxes are instituted and placed under the responsibility of a receiver of the wateringues and drainage ditches, obliged to render annual accounts to the great members of the waeteringues who are the large landowners. Thus, in the châtellenie of Bourbourg, the five great members of the waeteringues are the lord of the Cour du Ghyselhuys, lord of the place, the vicomte castellan of Bourbourg, the abbot of the abbey of Saint Bertin of Saint-Omer, the abbot of the abbey of Clairmarais and the abbess of Bourbourg.

=== After the French Revolution ===
According to the chief engineer of bridges and roads Joseph Louis Étienne Cordier (1775–1849): "Two-thirds of the Dunkirk district, lying below sea level, as well as Holland, were flooded in 1793 as a defense measure. The following seven years, the soil soaked in salt was almost sterile and the people became very unhappy. For this reason, they were granted the privilege of governing themselves. The landowners of the Wateringues have, since that time, the right to assemble, to appoint commissioners, and to invest them with great power. These commissioners, or administrators, chosen from the most enlightened landowners, establish taxes, regulate their use."

Cordier adds: "The only safety measure taken by law is the obligation imposed on the commissioners to have each act approved by the Prefect. This precaution prevents all abuses, without causing delays in business operations, as the Prefect supports with all his power such a useful institution. This paternal administration enjoys such consideration that it freely obtains from taxpayers more than 200,000 francs per year; and the influence of the work it carries out is so rapid that in less than ten years the lands of the Wateringues have doubled in value. This country is prospering as quickly as the United States of America and for the same reasons. Every year, roads are opened; locks, drainage canals, and irrigation canals are built; the population is growing rapidly; farms are springing up everywhere; agriculture is making rapid progress; and already on these lands, formerly marshy, superb crops of flax, rapeseed, precious crops once considered privileged and peculiar to the Lille district alone, are observed. If the country of the Wateringues, now so rich, were subject to common law; if the right to impose extraordinary taxes were denied it, in less than three years it would return under water."

== Wateringues ==
=== Meaning ===
The word "wateringue" seems to come from the contraction of two words: water = water and ring = circle.

By analogy, some have deduced that this meant canals or marshes. Others, by extension, used the term to refer to both the administration responsible for drainage and the canals themselves, which are also called watergangs.

=== Organization ===
In the 12th century, Philip of Alsace decided to organize drainage along the entire coast at the same time. In this context, he divided the territory of the coast into wateringues, whose administration he entrusted to the abbots of the four abbeys of Saint-Omer, Furnes, des Dunes, and Bergues, with the title of opper-watergraaf, or chief count of the waters. They entrusted their responsibility to three assemblies, "benches," composed of bailiffs representing the châtellenies, aldermen constituting the magistrate of the cities and keures, and finally fief men representing the lords of the country. These benches had the power to appoint watergraven, counts of the waters. These watergraven met in assemblies or colleges. Their roles were to determine drainage programs, decide on the layout of new watergangs and canals to be created, deal with the establishment and maintenance of dikes, roads, and their conservation, set taxes, maintain order within the wateringues by enforcing their police regulations and administering justice. These colleges had extensive powers, even the right to build dikes if necessary, and if necessary following the refusal of tenants, to impose a fine. However, the counts retained some control over the organization, and if the abbey refused to carry out necessary works, the abbey could be forced to pay the subsidy that the wateringues declared by oath to be necessary. On the other hand, those who damaged or broke the dikes would be subject to the justice of the count, whose bailiff inspected each year the dikes and works necessary for the flow of water.

The charter of April 1255 gives the bailiff, castellan, and watergraaf the right to regulate the water of the mill [...] for twelve weeks "for the public good." Indeed, many mills dotted the canals and altered the flow of water in summer. This water right had until now been an inviolable right consecrated by numerous charters since the Merovingian era. This measure by the countess of Flanders was harsh but technical advances made it possible to replace water mills with windmills imported from the East.

This last charter allowed a real advance in land drainage and the power of the four abbots and their watergrafs only increased. The counts of Flanders took umbrage at this, and in 1292, to safeguard their influence over the territory, imposed technicians tasked with consulting assemblies and coordinating major works, ensuring their execution, and taking charge of the management of these administrations. They took the name of general moermaistre of Flanders, or general governor of the marshes of Flanders. The counts increased the prerogatives of these officials at the expense of the colleges created by the four abbots. Following the excesses of these said officials, and then the zeal of their replacements, the lords saw their powers and privileges threatened.

=== Robert de Cassel ===
One of these lords, Robert de Cassel, count of Marles, heir to the lordship of Dunkirk, brought a lawsuit against Philip of Burgundy, count of Flanders, before the Parliament of Paris in 1403. On October 7, the judgment of the Parliament reaffirmed that the wateringues were not administrative divisions but territorial divisions created according to the ordinance of Philip of Alsace in 1169. Robert de Cassel is therefore recognized as the legitimate owner, and the rights claimed by the count of Flanders, other than suzerainty, are null and void.

=== Louis XIV ===
Louis XIV, after the conquest of Flanders, also interfered in the organization of the wateringues by replacing the general moermaistre with Intendants of maritime Flanders. It was not until the Revolution that these officials disappeared definitively, but they were quickly replaced by the Ponts-et-Chaussées by a decree of the general council of Pas-de-Calais of February 28, 1793.

== Complements ==
- The first known ordinance concerning the wateringues dates back to 1169 (charter of Philip of Alsace, count of Flanders and Vermandois)
- The last royal decree concerning drainage by the wateringues dates from December 6, 1789
- In 1806, an imperial decree and then another on May 28, 1809, and a royal ordinance in 1833 were issued
- In 1816, the geographer and cartographer Louis Cordier drew a map of the Nord department and a map of the Dunkirk district including the four sections of the wateringues, or the French marshes, in 1815 (by MM. Cordier and Bosquillon, engineers)
- In 1852, Louis Devot estimated that "30 thousand hectares of land worth nearly 100 million francs are protected against flooding, and are now in a state of cultivation"

=== A permanent maritime threat ===
This is due to two phenomena: situations of overtopping, unpredictable over long periods of time, and for some decades or centuries because of rising sea levels and perhaps increased risks of winter rainfall.

Thus, on January 31, 1953, a storm swept through the Calaisis. It pushed the sea towards the coast. A dike gave way at a place called Maison Blanche near Oye-Plage, drowning 23 hectares of land. Another breach (15 meters wide) was reported between Blériot-Plage and Sangatte, flooding the national road and fields under 40 centimeters of saltwater. Despite the heavy equipment quickly deployed, one of the two repairs gave way to the following tide, which flooded 200 hectares near Oye-Plage this time. In the port of Calais, the Angoulême quay is underwater, without human casualties.

Today, the network of wateringues is managed by the wateringue sections, responsible for dredging, mowing, and clearing to ensure proper water flow and maintain navigation where it is practiced. Occasionally, they may intervene in the fight against certain invasive species (marsh marigold, muskrat, Japanese knotweed, etc.).

For their part, private landowners must maintain their banks to ensure proper water flow, avoid hydraulic problems (pruning willows, coppicing, pruning, etc.), which can sometimes contradict the needs or projects for the renaturation of the green and blue framework to restore the good ecological status of the watershed (in inhabited areas, residents and municipalities have often heavily engineered the banks (wood tunnelling, metal sheeting, sheet piling, concrete slabs, brick walls, rubble, etc.) to limit erosion and the meandering of watercourses).

In addition, the Intercommunal Institution of the Wateringues ensures the management, operation, and maintenance of large evacuation structures to the sea. Moreover, various water-related unions also contribute to maintaining watercourses (e.g., SMAGE Aa, SYMSAGEL, SAGE of the Delta of the Aa, River Syndicate of the Melde in the Pays de Saint-Omer). SAGEs are part of the places where these actions are coordinated.

In 2009, a risk study was launched by the DREAL to better assess and understand the level of flood risk in the Wateringues polder in the event of an unfavorable synergy between meteorology (for example, in the event of watershed floods combined with one or more episodes of rain saturating the polder soils) and a high tide and/or overtopping and possible malfunctioning of structures, while taking into account climate change and sea level rise. A method for quantifying the hazard was created for this purpose, inspired by those developed for the study of extreme levels along the Loire estuary by Lepelletier in 2010. Such a study requires a very good understanding of the hydro-ecological functioning of the basin that feeds the waterways.

== See also ==
- Tile drainage
- Marais Audomarois
- Les Moëres, Nord
- Polder
- Wetland
- Ditch

== Bibliography ==
- Schramme, Jos. Des Wateringues (in French). E. Scheller.
- Antoine, Alfred (1923). Les Wateringues françaises (Nord et Pas-de-Calais) (in French). impr. Joly-Thuilliez.
- Barraqué, B. (2011). Des bisses aux wateringues..., De l'usage en commun des eaux en Europe (in French). Les Bisses, écono.
- Khaladi, A. Gestion automatique des transferts d'eau en réseaux hydrauliques mailles à surface libre (application au réseau des Wateringues) (in French). Thèse de doctorat.
- Lepelletier, T.; Lemoigne, E.; Henique, J.; Clerc, J.; Parent, F.; Cusenier, P. (2014). Détermination de l'aléa risque inondation dans le secteur des Wateringues (in French). Vol. 4. La Houille blanche.
- Masson, F. X. (1979). Recherche sur les sols et leur cartographie dans la plaine maritime des Wateringues du Nord et du Pas-de-Calais (in French).
- Planque, T. (2019). Aménagements hydrauliques et enjeux de pouvoirs à Dunkerque et dans sa périphérie rurale (1852-1929). université Lumière-Lyon 2. pp. 2 vol. (277, 29).
- Quarré-Reybourbon, Louis (2014). Dessèchement des wateringues et des Moeres dans l'arrondissement de Dunkerque... travail communiqué au congrès national de géographie de Lille, le 2 août 1892 (in French). Westhoekpedia Reprints.
