= Ghyvelde =

Ghyvelde Gijvelde
- Commune
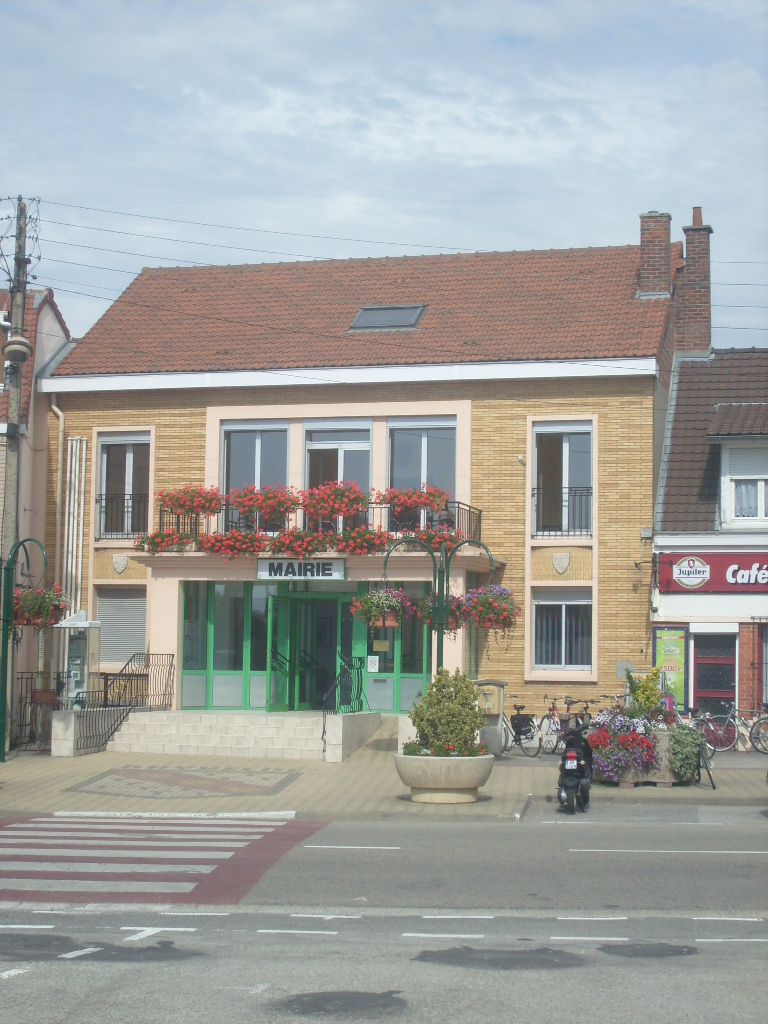
- Ghyvelde in the arrondissement of Dunkirk

- Coat of arms
- Location of Ghyvelde
- Location within France Location within Hauts-de-France
- Coordinates: 51°03′08″N 2°31′41″E
- Country: France
- Region: Hauts-de-France
- Department: Nord
- Arrondissement: Dunkerque
- Canton: Dunkerque-2
- Intercommunality: CU Dunkerque

Government
  - Mayor (2024–2026): Anthony Raes
- Area^{1}: 35.92 km^{2} (13.87 sq mi)
- Elevation: 4 m (13 ft)
- Highest elevation: 25 m (82 ft)
- Lowest elevation: 0 m (0 ft)
- Population (2023): 4,133
  - Density: 115.1/km^{2} (298.0/sq mi)
- Demonym: Ghyveldois
- Time zone: UTC+01:00 (CET)
  - Summer (DST): UTC+02:00 (CEST)
- INSEE/Postal code: 59260 /59254
- ^{1} French Land Register data, which excludes lakes, ponds, glaciers > 1 km^{2} (0.386 sq mi or 247 acres) and river estuaries.

Ghyvelde (French pronunciation: [ɡivɛld]; Dutch: Gijvelde, West Flemish: Gyvelde) is a commune in the Nord department in northern France. It is located on the Belgian border, and just inland from the North Sea. It is, after Bray-Dunes, the second most northern commune of France. The E40/A16 passes through the commune. On 1 January 2016, the former commune Les Moëres was merged into Ghyvelde.

== Population ==
Population data refer to the area corresponding with the commune as of January 2025.

Historical population
Year	Pop.	±% p.a.
1968	2,674	—
1975	2,697	+0.12%
1982	3,817	+5.09%
1990	3,666	−0.50%
1999	3,679	+0.04%
2007	3,882	+0.67%
2012	4,130	+1.25%
2017	4,193	+0.30%
2023	4,133	−0.24%
Source: INSEE

== Gallery ==
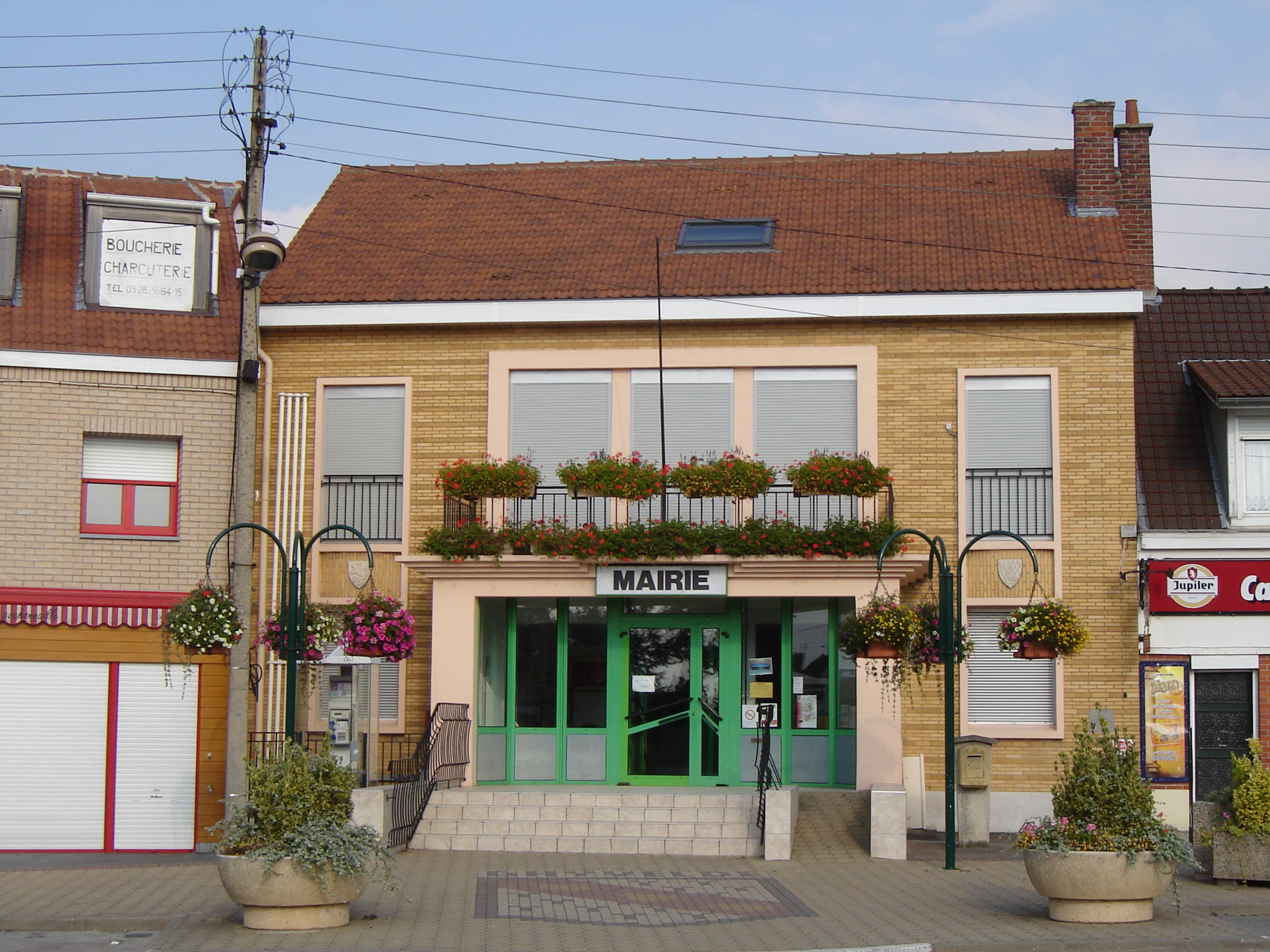
Town hall

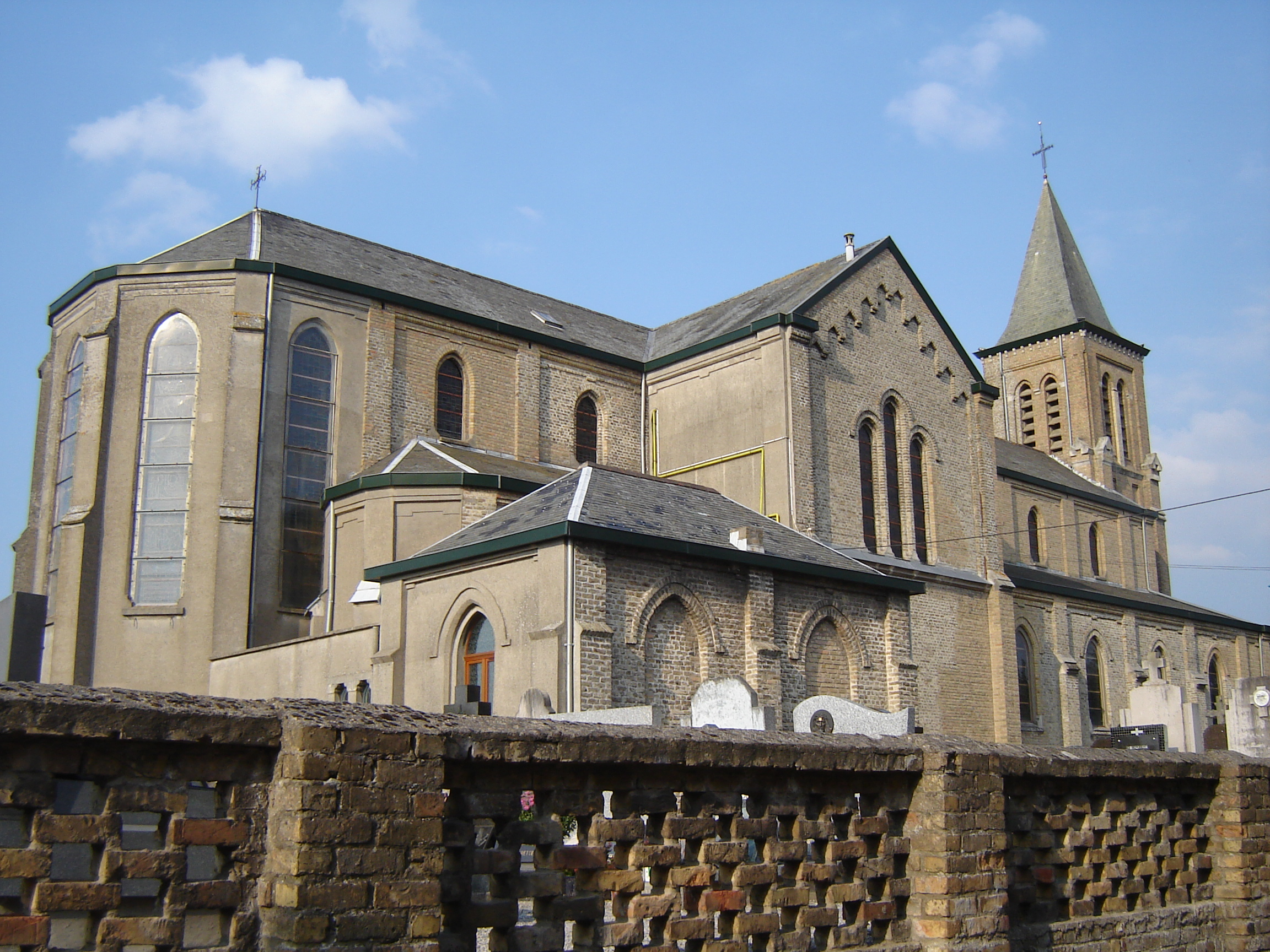
Saint-Vincent church

== Heraldry ==
Arms of Ghyvelde	The arms of Ghyvelde are blazoned : Ermine, on a bend gules, 3 escallops bendwise Or. (Ghyvelde and Hondschoote use the same arms.)

== See also ==
- Communes of the Nord department
