= Zuydcoote =

- Commune
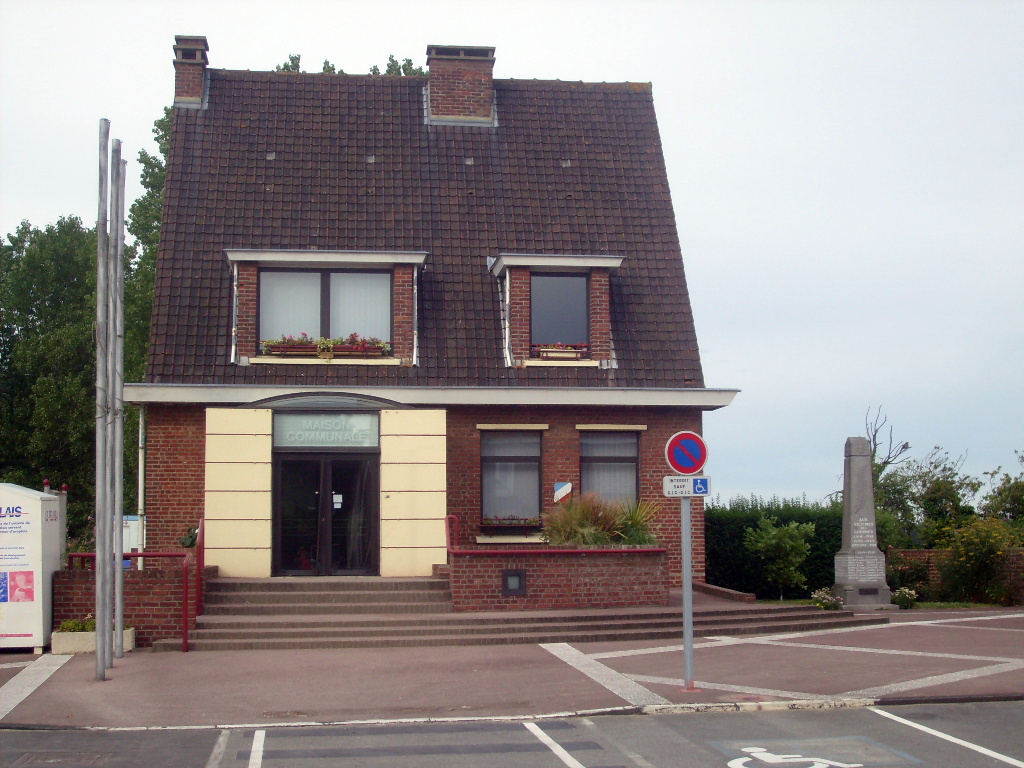
- The town hall in Zuydcoote

- Coat of arms
- Location of Zuydcoote
- Location within France Location within Hauts-de-France
- Coordinates: 51°03′54″N 2°29′25″E
- Country: France
- Region: Hauts-de-France
- Department: Nord
- Arrondissement: Dunkerque
- Canton: Dunkerque-2
- Intercommunality: CU Dunkerque

Government
  - Mayor (2020–2026): Florence Vanhille
- Area^{1}: 2.6 km^{2} (1.0 sq mi)
- Elevation: 5 m (16 ft)
- Highest elevation: 26 m (85 ft)
- Lowest elevation: 1 m (3.3 ft)
- Population (2023): 1,630
  - Density: 630/km^{2} (1,600/sq mi)
- Demonym(s): Zuydcootois, Zuydcootoises
- Time zone: UTC+01:00 (CET)
  - Summer (DST): UTC+02:00 (CEST)
- INSEE/Postal code: 59668 /59123
- ^{1} French Land Register data, which excludes lakes, ponds, glaciers > 1 km^{2} (0.386 sq mi or 247 acres) and river estuaries.

Zuydcoote (French pronunciation: [zɥitkot]; West Flemish and Dutch: Zuidkote) is a commune in the Nord department in northern France.

== Heraldry ==
Arms of Zuydcoote	The arms of Zuydcoote are blazoned : Argent, a doubleheaded eagle displayed sable, beaked and armed gules, between 2 lions respectant sable, armed and langued gules.

== Population ==
Historical population

Year	Pop.	±% p.a.
1793	173	—
1821	283	+1.77%
1846	317	+0.45%
1872	318	+0.01%
1901	431	+1.05%
1906	637	+8.13%
1911	1,039	+10.28%
1921	1,405	+3.06%
1926	1,635	+3.08%
1931	1,721	+1.03%
1936	1,767	+0.53%
1946	390	−14.02%

Year	Pop.	±% p.a.
1954	1,140	+14.35%
1962	1,002	−1.60%
1968	1,029	+0.44%
1975	1,115	+1.15%
1982	1,321	+2.45%
1990	1,617	+2.56%
1999	1,578	−0.27%
2007	1,688	+0.85%
2012	1,727	+0.46%
2017	1,677	−0.59%
2023	1,630	−0.47%

Source: EHESS and INSEE

== Gallery ==
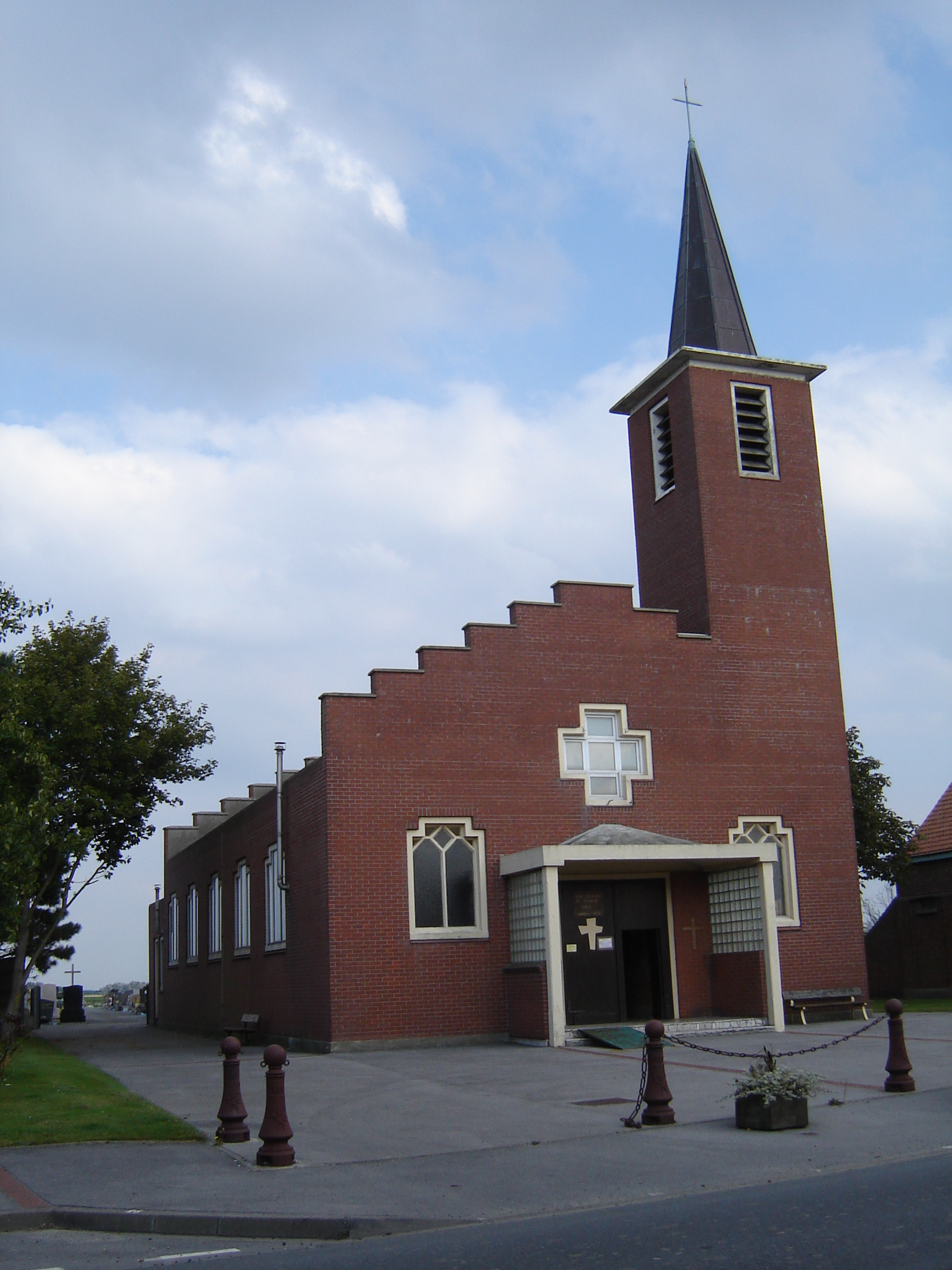
Saint-Nicolas church

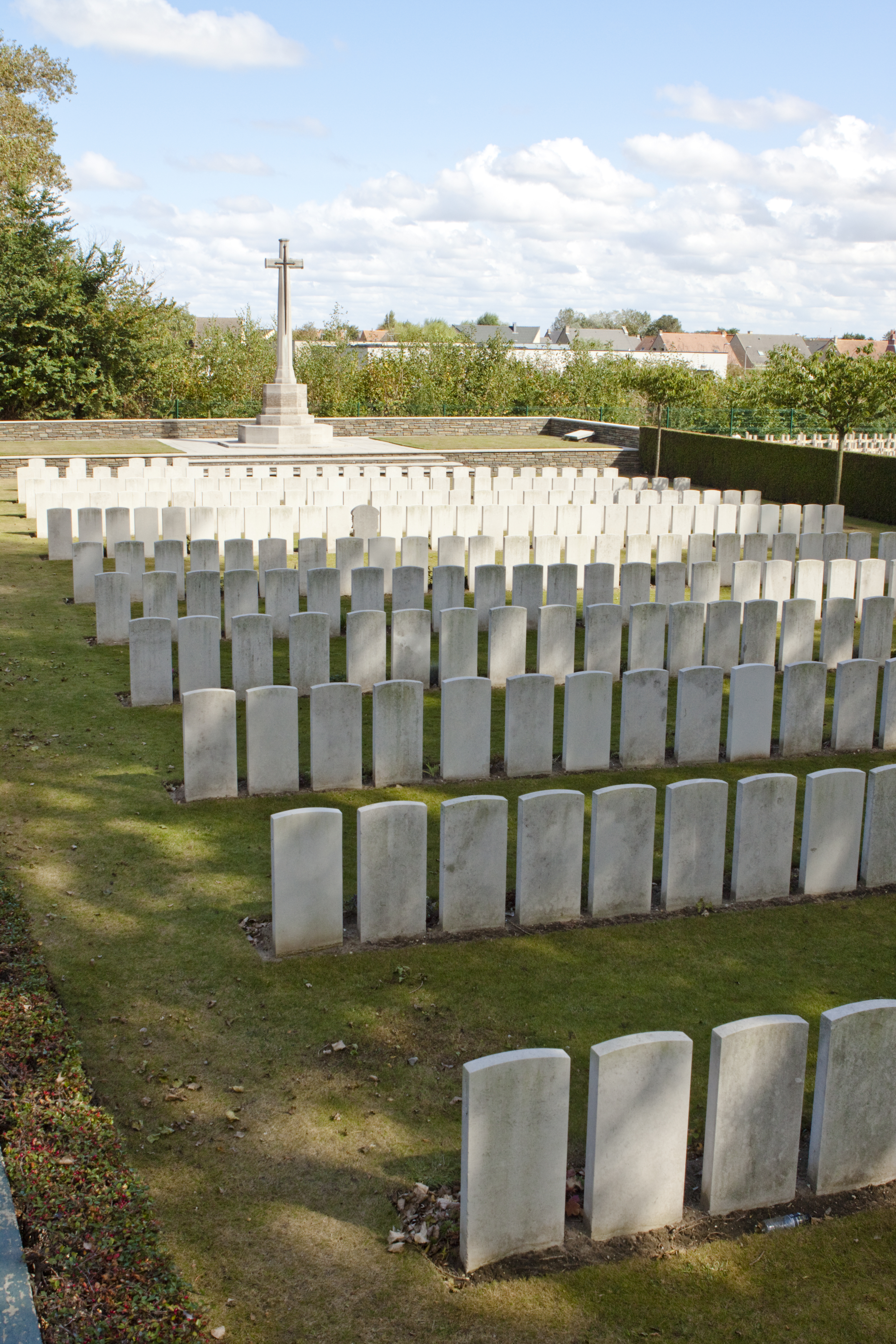
Zuydcoote Military Cemetery

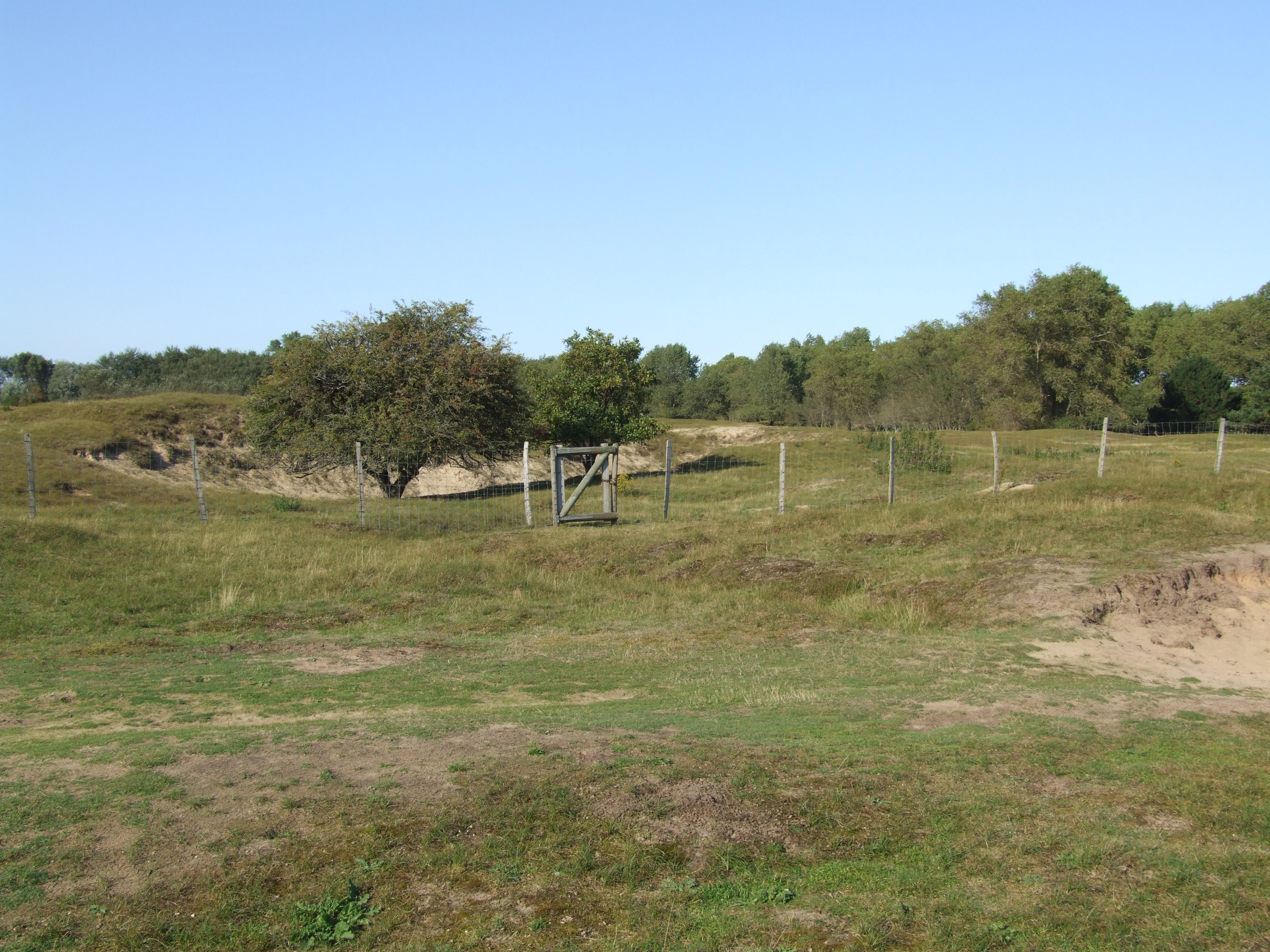
Dune fossile de Ghyvelde

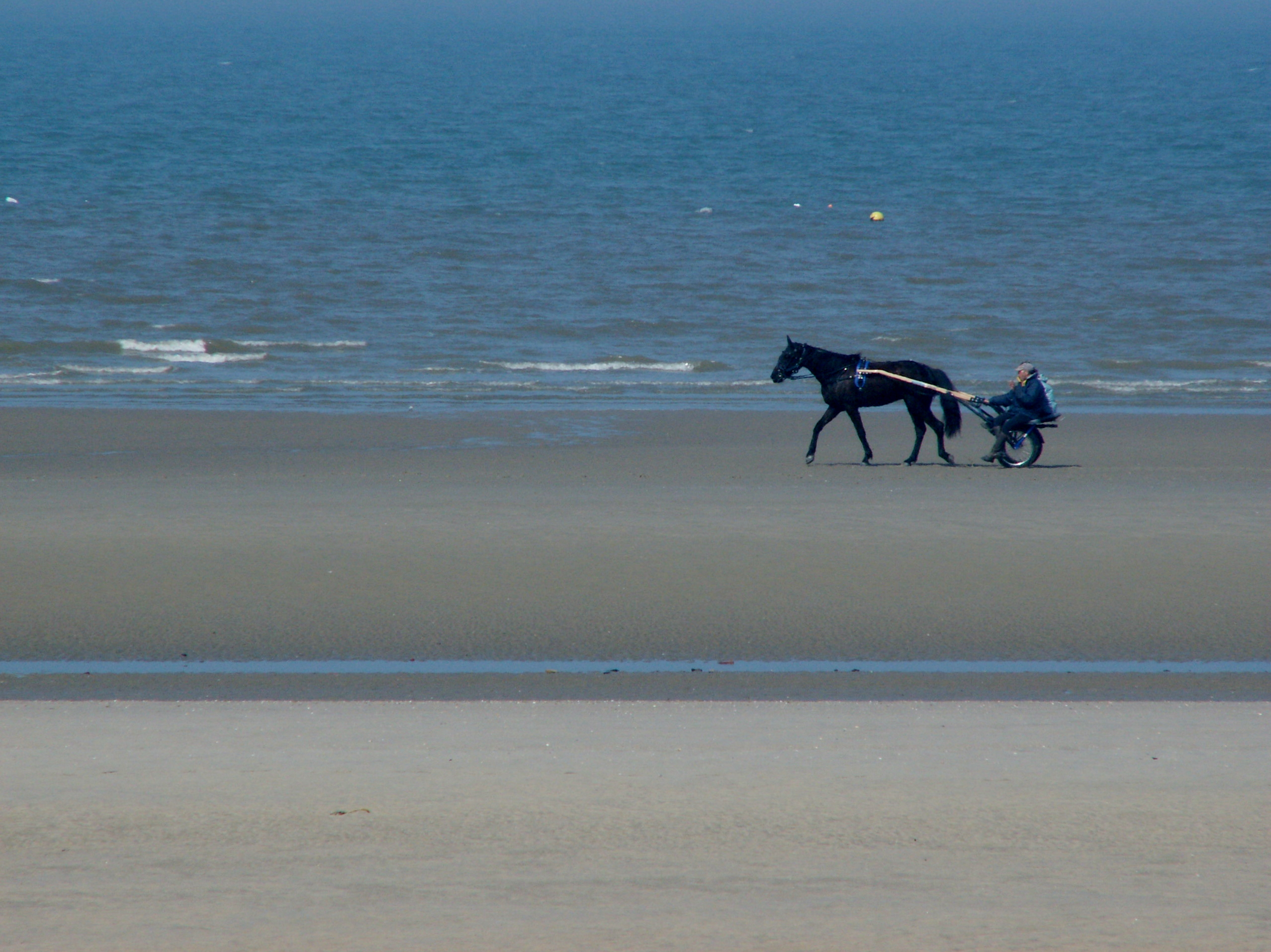
Zuydcoote Beach

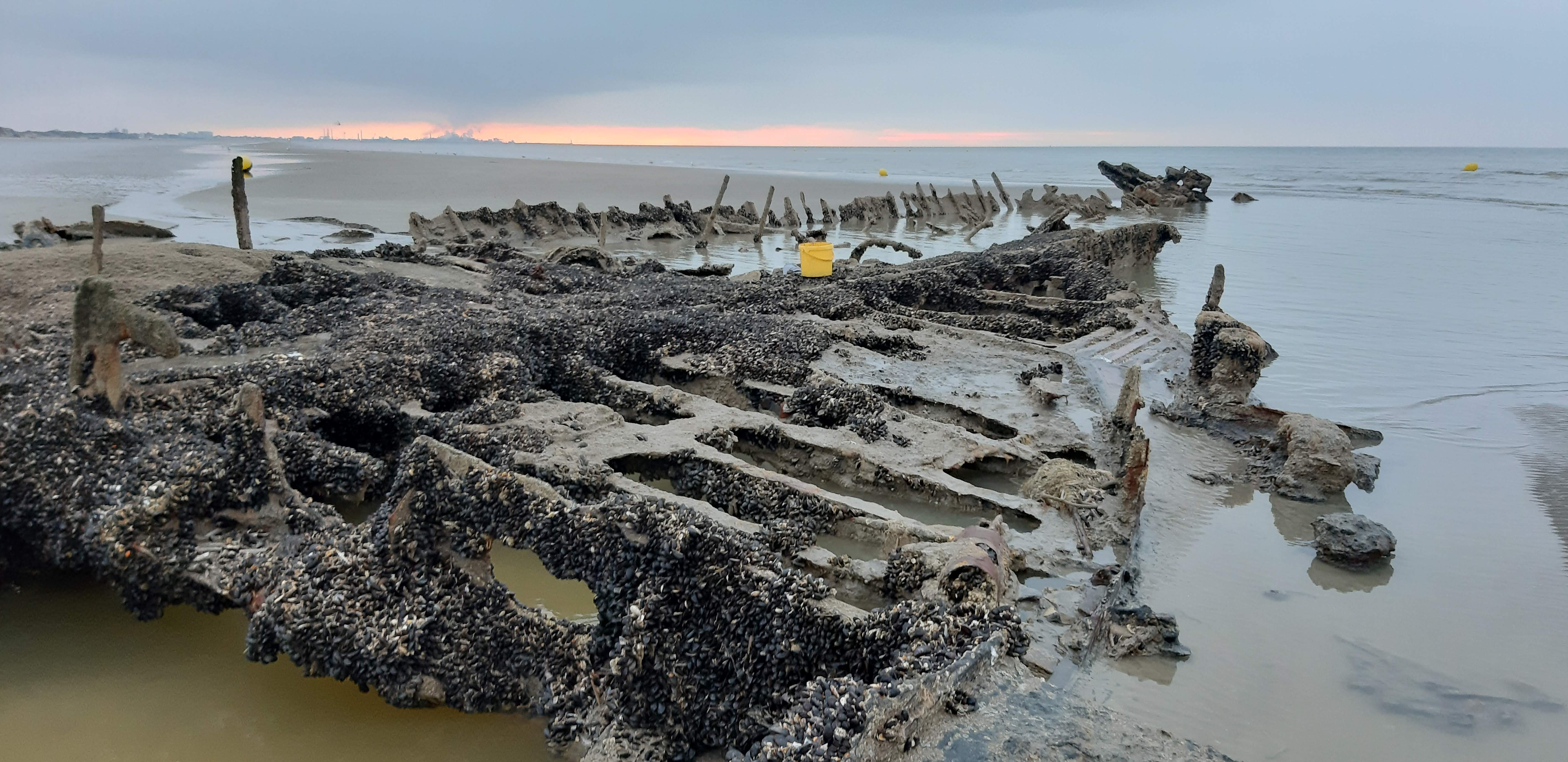
Shipwreck of HMS Crested Eagle on the Zuydcoote beach.

== See also ==
- Communes of the Nord department
