= Les Moëres, Nord =

Les Moëres
- Part of Ghyvelde
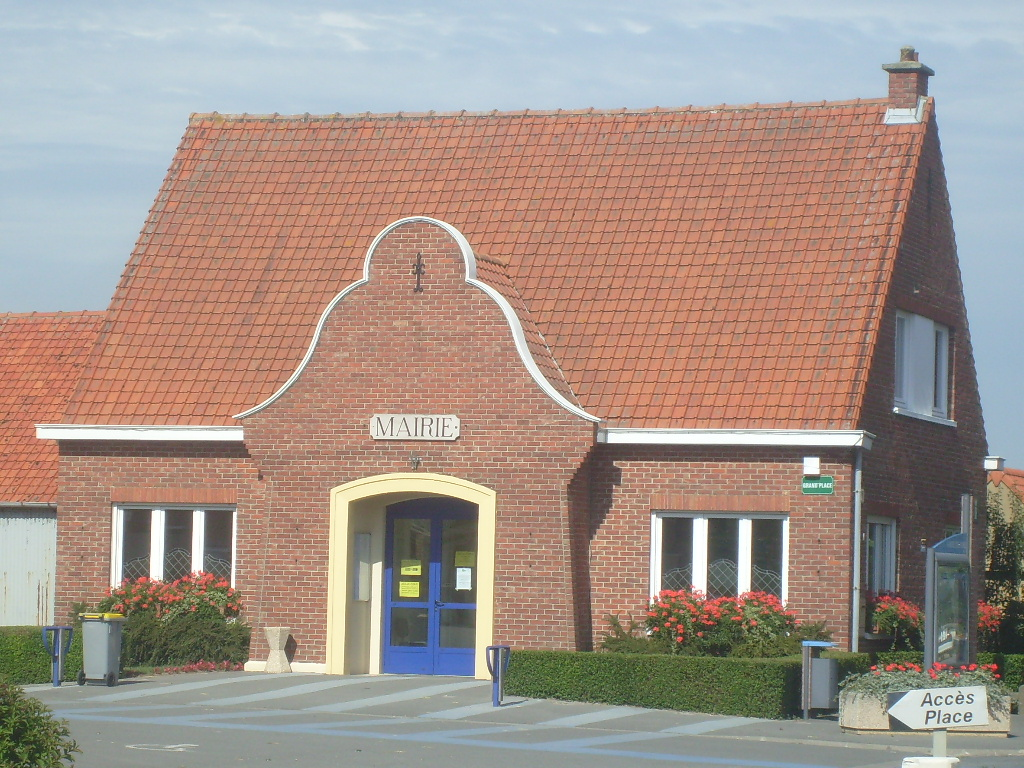
- Town hall
- Location of Les Moëres
- Location within France Location within Hauts-de-France
- Coordinates: 51°01′01″N 2°33′00″E
- Country: France
- Region: Hauts-de-France
- Department: Nord
- Arrondissement: Dunkerque
- Canton: Dunkerque-2
- Commune: Ghyvelde
- Area^{1}: 19.46 km^{2} (7.51 sq mi)
- Elevation: 1 m (3.3 ft)
- Highest elevation: 2 m (6.6 ft)
- Lowest elevation: −4 m (−13 ft)
- Population (2021): 872
  - Density: 44.8/km^{2} (116/sq mi)
- Demonym: Morins
- Time zone: UTC+01:00 (CET)
  - Summer (DST): UTC+02:00 (CEST)
- Postal code: 59122
- ^{1} French Land Register data, which excludes lakes, ponds, glaciers > 1 km^{2} (0.386 sq mi or 247 acres) and river estuaries.

Les Moëres (French pronunciation: [le mɔɛʁ], historically [le mwaʁ]; West Flemish: De Moern) is a former commune in the Nord department in northern France. On 1 January 2016, it was merged into the commune Ghyvelde.

== Heraldry ==
Arms of Les Moëres	The arms of Les Moëres are blazoned : Argent, a garb of wheat sable tied argent, within a wreath of wheat sable, tied argent.

== War graves ==
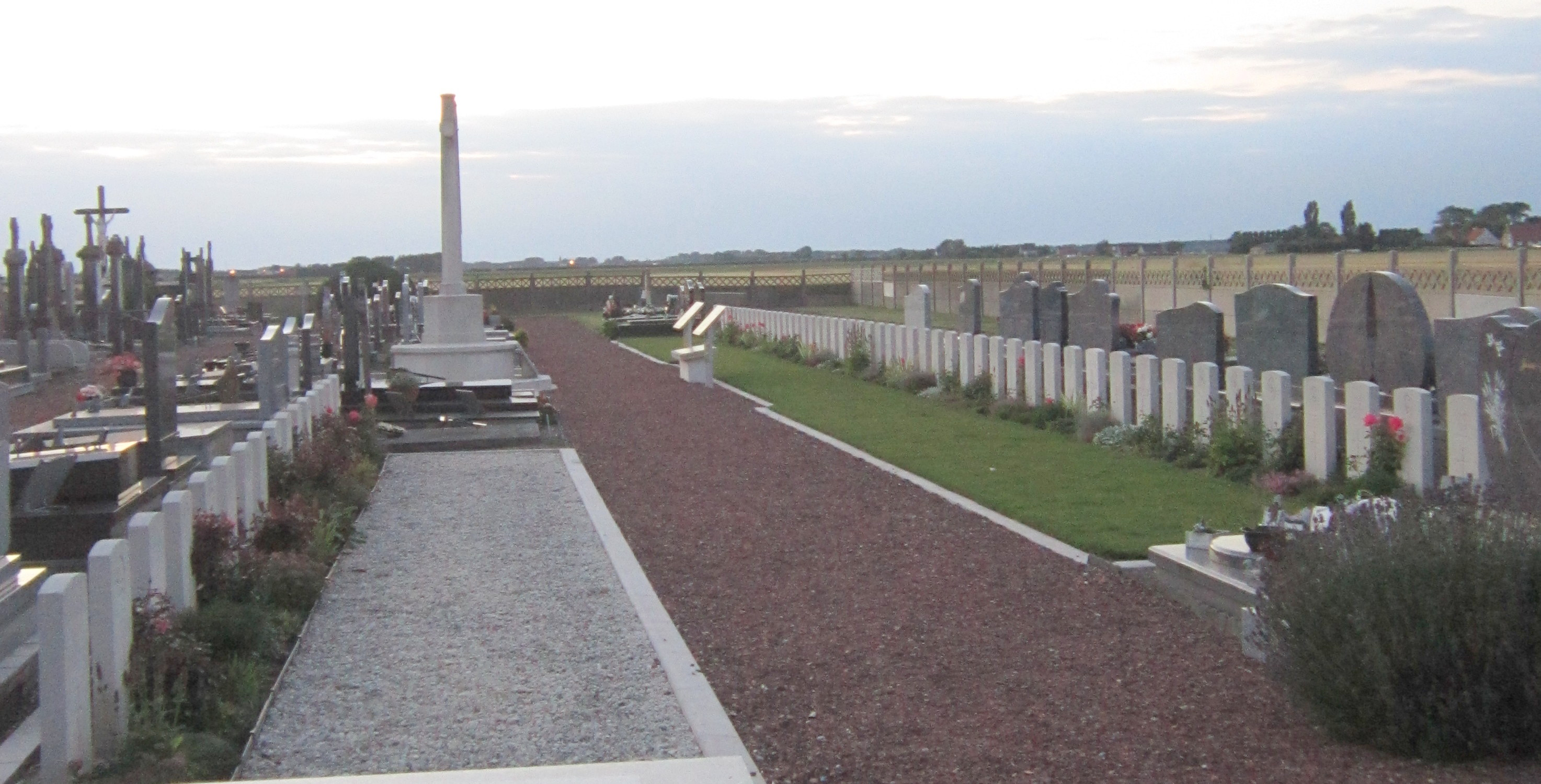
Commonwealth war graves.

== Population ==
Historical population
Year	Pop.	±% p.a.
2006	724	—
2011	862	+3.55%
2021	872	+0.12%
Source: INSEE

== See also ==
- Communes of the Nord department
- Les Moëres
