= Tile drainage =

Form of agricultural drainage system

Tile drainage is a form of agricultural drainage system that removes excess sub-surface water from fields to allow sufficient air space within the soil, proper cultivation, and access by heavy machinery to tend and harvest crops. While surface water can be drained by pumping, open ditches, or both, tile drainage is often the most effective means of draining subsurface water.

The phrase "tile drainage" derives from its original composition from ceramic tiles of fired clay, which were similar to terracotta pipes yet not always shaped as pipes. In the 19th century a C-shaped channel tile commonly was placed like an arch atop a flat tile, denominated the "mug" and "sole", respectively. Today, tile drainage is any variation of this original system that functions in the same mode. Commonly HDPE and PVC tubing denominated "tile line" is used, although precast concrete and ceramic tiles are still used.

== Typical pathways for agricultural drainage and the occasionally used pathways for treatment and reuse ==
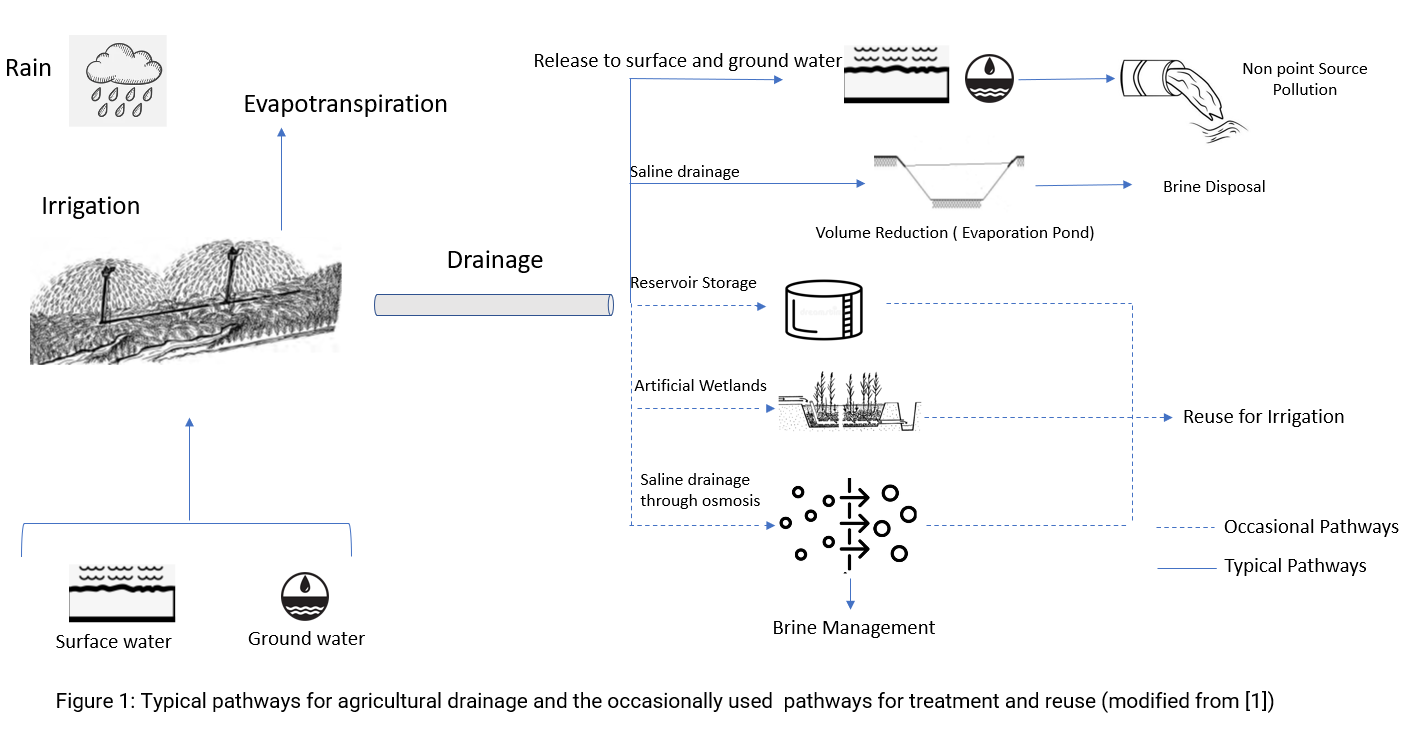
Typical pathways for agricultural drainage and the occasionally used pathways for treatment and reuse

The figure illustrates the most used irrigation techniques as well as the least used options for treatment and recycling of water drainage. Collecting nutrient-rich irrigation water in reservoirs and pumping them back to crop fields during drought periods is an affordable practice and gaining increasing popularity among farmers in states like Iowa, Indiana, Ohio, Illinois and Minnesota. In Western U.S. States, water salinity is usually higher and direct recycling is not a viable option. Advanced treatment techniques such as reverse osmosis are required to make water drainage suitable for reuse.

== Types of drainage systems ==
There are two types of drainage systems that are used by farmers:

- Surface drainage: Facilitated by ditches and by maintaining natural channels to allow water to move downward by the force of gravity.
- Subsurface drainage: Built by burying pipes underground to remove excess water from the soil profile.

Subsurface drainage is widely used by farmers. It has many advantages:

- It increases soil humidity and leads to better crop yields.
- It stops the accumulation of salts and gives farmers more flexibility to plant different types of crops.
- It reduces the buildup of sediments at the surface of the field which reduces the concentration of phosphorus.

Two techniques are generally used to control drainage:

- Adding structures such as flashboard risers in outlet canals to control the residence time of irrigation water in the root zone: When these structures are removed, subsurface drainage takes place more rapidly and the amount of water in ditches decreases. This technique permits not only to manage the level of water in fields but also allows maximum storage of water within the field for utilization by the crop.
- A more advanced form of control drainage consists of underground drainpipes that are connected to a collecting pipe that unloads runoff in control reservoirs. These reservoirs are referred to as tailwater recovery systems. They conserve runoff and pump them back to irrigate crop fields. They act as bio-filters and remove different types of contaminants, including bacteria, nutrients, and pesticides from agricultural runoff.

== Federal and state regulations and guidelines for recycling agricultural drainage ==
Recycling agricultural drainage water is an effective non-conventional method to overcome water scarcity in arid areas. In the United States, although the Federal Water Pollution Control Act legislates water quality and pollution at the national level, water reuse laws and regulations are the responsibility of states and local governments. Reclaimed water in agriculture is a rapidly increasing practice, especially in arid states such as Texas, Nevada, Arizona, and California. These states have passed the following laws to enforce water agricultural reuse standards.

- The California State Water Resources Control Board introduced a Recycled Water Policy in 2009 that proposes salt and nutrient management plans and addresses pollutants of emerging concern in reclaimed water. The California Water Code governs the recycling of water for irrigation and residential landscaping.
- In Arizona, the Department of Water Resources and the Department of Environmental Quality are the main departments involved in water recycling. The Arizona Administrative Code Title 18, governs the permitting and conveyances quality of reclaimed water.
- In Nevada, the Division of Water Resources is the principal agency in charge of water reuse legislations through the Administrative Code 445A.274 to 445A.280.
- In Texas, the Administrative Code, Title 30 implemented by the Texas Commission on Environmental Quality governs the reuse of water for agricultural purposes.
- Many other states such New York and Connecticut do not have any regulations that legislate water recycling for agricultural purposes. Other states such as Alabama, Georgia, and Hawaii did not pass the stage of implementing general guidelines that are enforceable.

== Irrigation Water Quality Standards ==
Irrigated agriculture depends on an adequate quantity and an acceptable quality.

The amount of dissolved salt in water is a primordial factor to determine its suitability for irrigation. As salt accumulates in soil, it retains water and makes it unavailable to crops which results in water stress for plants. According to the University of California Committee of Consultant's Water Quality Guidelines:

- an electrical conductivity of over 3 dS/m is considered a severe level of salinity that would result in a reduction in yields.
- A normal sodium adsorption ratio (SAR) must be within the range of 3 to 9 SAR.
- Total dissolved solids (TDS) is another factor that contributes to the salinity of water, plants encounter severe growth limitations when the value is above 2000 mg/L.
- Certain ions present in irrigation water could be toxic to plants at high concentrations. Chloride concentration should not surpass 10 milliequivalent per liter (me/L) for surface irrigation.
- Boron is an essential micronutrient to plants when its concentration in water is compromised between 0.7 and 3.0 mg/L.
- The presence of nitrogen at an excessive level is toxic to crops. A concentration of over 30 mg/L could delay crop maturity and result in overgrowth.
- An adequate pH level should be maintained within the range of 6.5 to 8.4.
- The level of bicarbonate in irrigated water should not exceed 8.5 me/L.

== Application ==
Roots of most crop plants require adequate air to prosper. Excess subsurface water fills the pores in soil and inhibits their growth by depriving roots of air, resulting in root rot and plant death.

An additional reason for sub-surface drainage is to ensure sufficient soil firmness for tillage and other access by heavy machinery to tend and harvest a crop.

== Increased crop yields ==
Most crops require specific soil moisture conditions, and do not grow well in wet, mucky soil. Even in soil that is not mucky the roots of most plants do not grow much deeper than the water table. Early in the growing season when water is in ample supply, plants are small and do not require as much water. During this time, the plants do not need to develop their roots to reach the water. As the plants grow and use more water water becomes more scarce. During this time, the water table begins to fall. Plants then need to develop roots to reach the water. During periods of dryness the water table can fall faster than the rate at which plants grow roots to reach it, which condition can gravely stress the plants.

By installing tile drainage, the water table is effectively lowered and plants can properly develop their roots. The lack of water saturation of soil permits oxygen to remain in the pores of the soil for use by roots. Drain tile prevents the roots from being under the water table during wet periods, which can stress the plants. By removing excess water crops use the water that their roots have access to more effectively. An increase in crop yield can be summarized as forcing plants to develop more roots so that they can absorb more nutrients and water.

The same principle operates in the pots of house plants: their drainage holes in the bottoms evacuate excess water from the medium so that air can fill the pores of the medium and be available to the roots which, if deprived of air by the saturation of the medium with water for a sufficient duration, will rot and die. Installing tile drainage in a field in a grid pattern achieves the same effect for a field of several hundred acres.

== Plumbing of drain tile ==
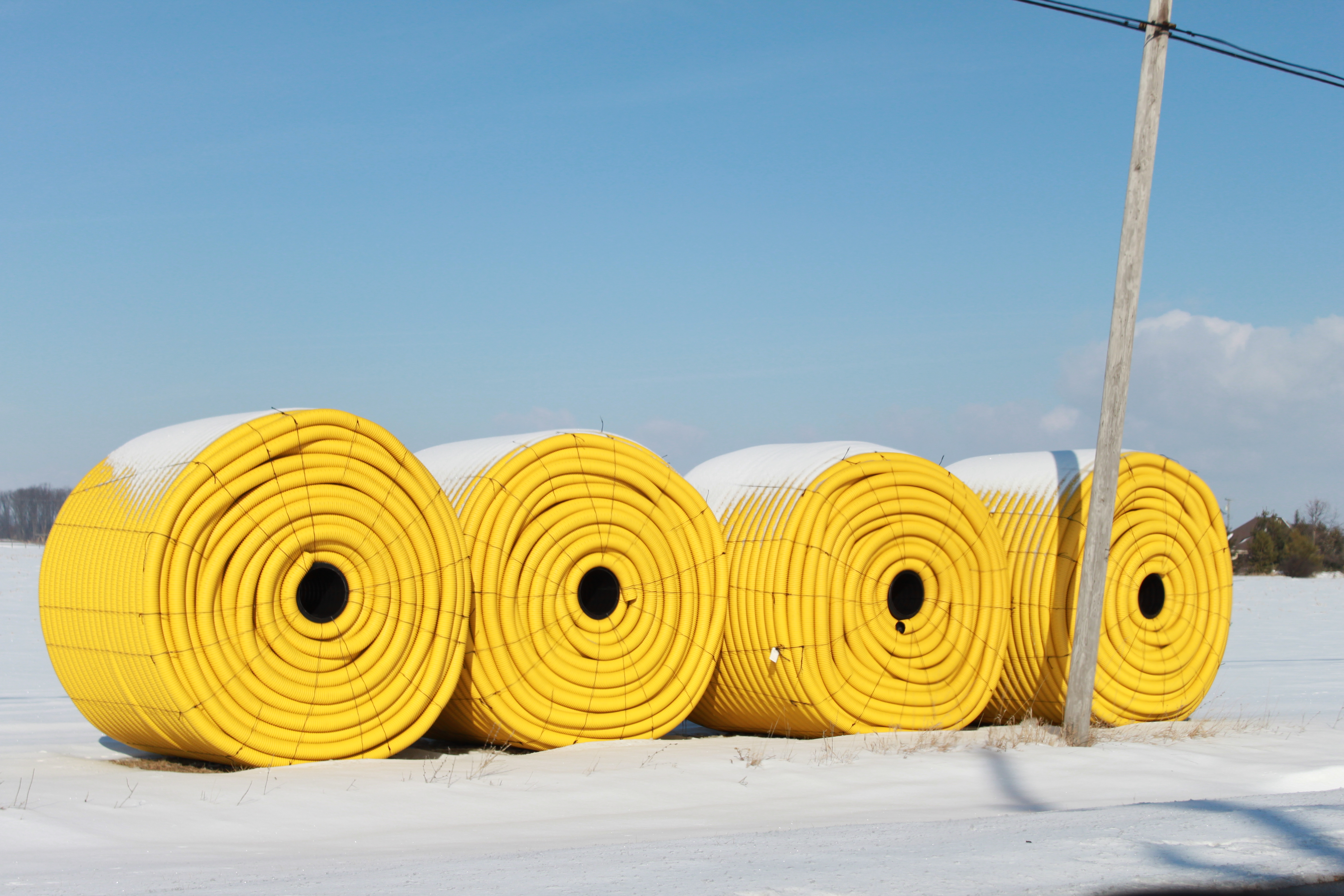
Giant rolls of polyethylene corrugated drainage pipe

In a tile drainage system, a sort of "plumbing" is installed below the surface of agricultural fields, effectively consisting of a network of below-ground pipes that allow subsurface water to move out from between soil particles and into the tile line. Water flowing through tile lines is often ultimately deposited into surface water points—lakes, streams, and rivers—located at a lower elevation than the source. Water enters the tile line either via the gaps between tile sections, in the case of older tile designs, or through small perforations in modern plastic tile. The installation of the tiles or tile line can involve a trencher (Ditch Witch), a mole plough, a backhoe, or other heavy equipment.

Soil type greatly affects the efficacy of tile systems, and dictates the extent to which the area must be tiled to ensure sufficient drainage. Sandier soils will need little, if any, additional drainage, whereas soils with high clay contents will hold their water tighter, requiring tile lines to be placed closer together.

=== Maintenance ===
Tree roots of hedgerow and windbreak trees are naturally attracted to the favorable watering conditions that adjacent fields' tiles or tile lines provide. Hydrotropism plays a role as root hairs at the dynamically probing tips of tree roots respond differentially to moister crevices versus drier ones, exchanging hormonal messages with the rest of the tree that encourage them to concentrate on advancing into such favorable niches. In the perforations of tile drainage lines, just as in cracked or rusting water lines and sewer lines under town streets, these roots find the ideal combination of an entrance to enter and a plentiful water supply behind it. The result is that in any of these pipe systems, blockages sometimes occur and it is necessary to clear them through snaking, rotary-cutter snaking, select digging and pulling, and similar methods. In some regions farmers must do continual maintenance of tile drainage lines to keep them open and operating correctly, with at least some clearing every year in one or another part of the system.

== History ==
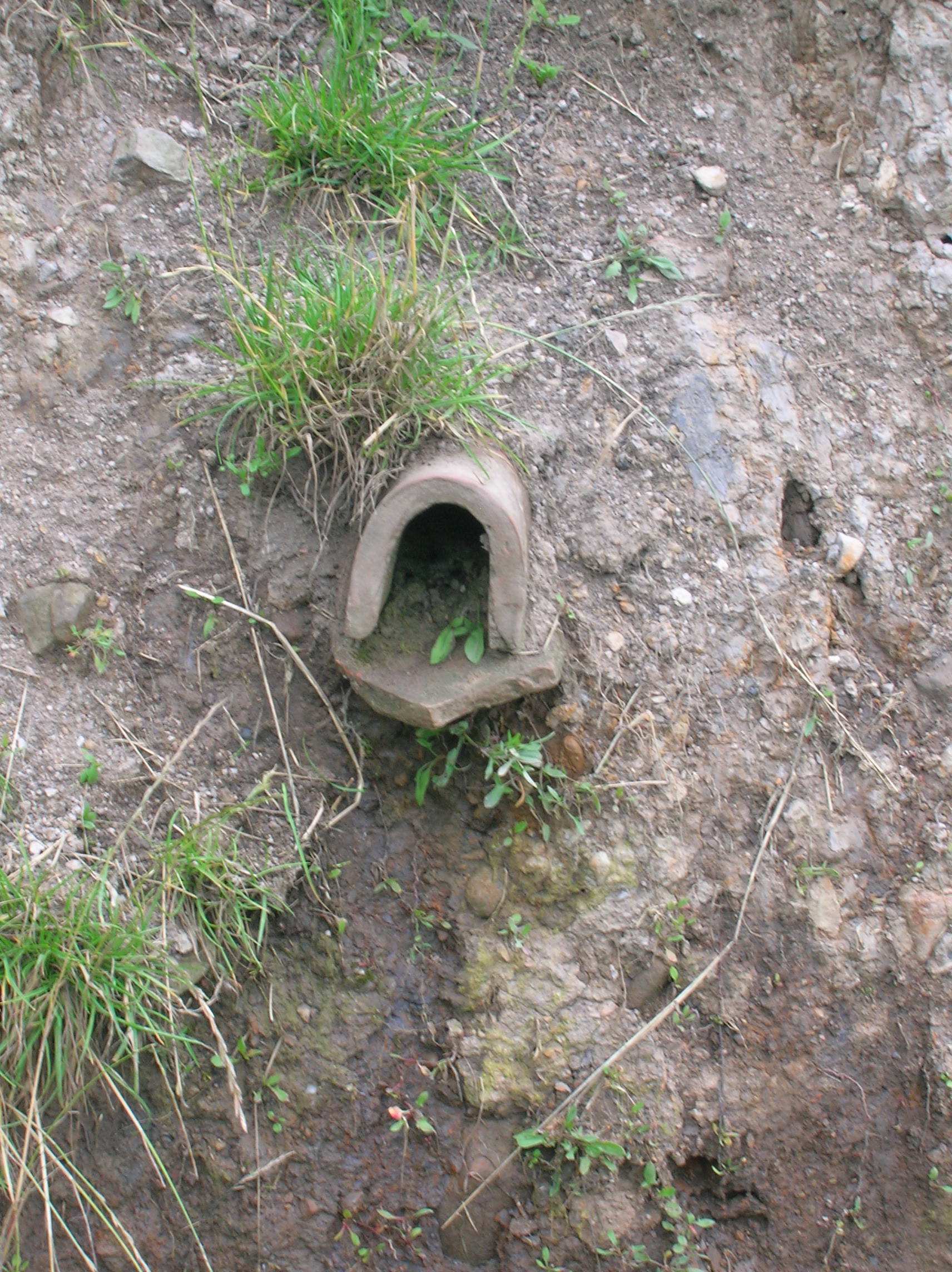
Mug and sole tiles

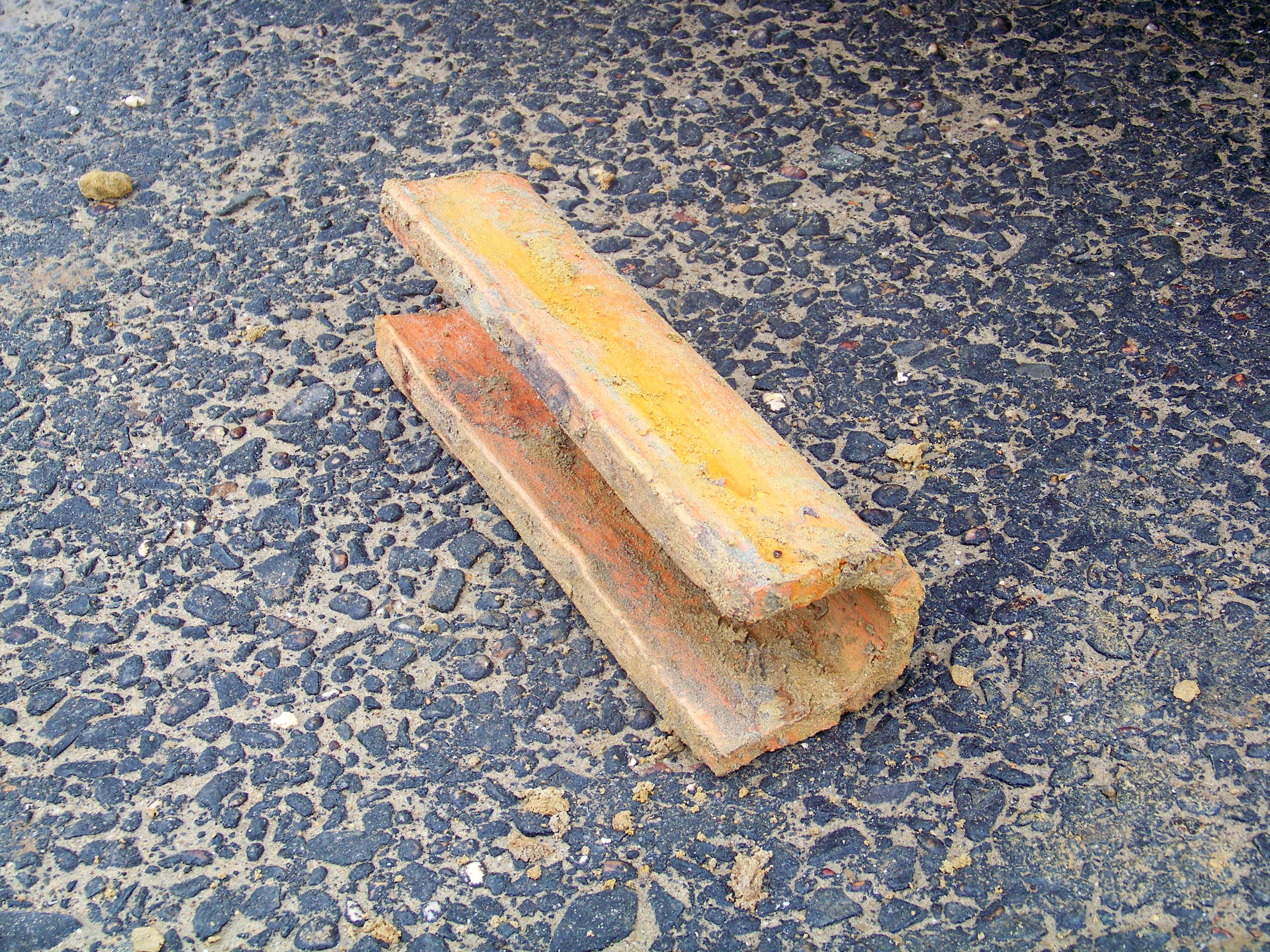
Old drain tile excavated from a construction site on a farm in Monmouth County, NJ

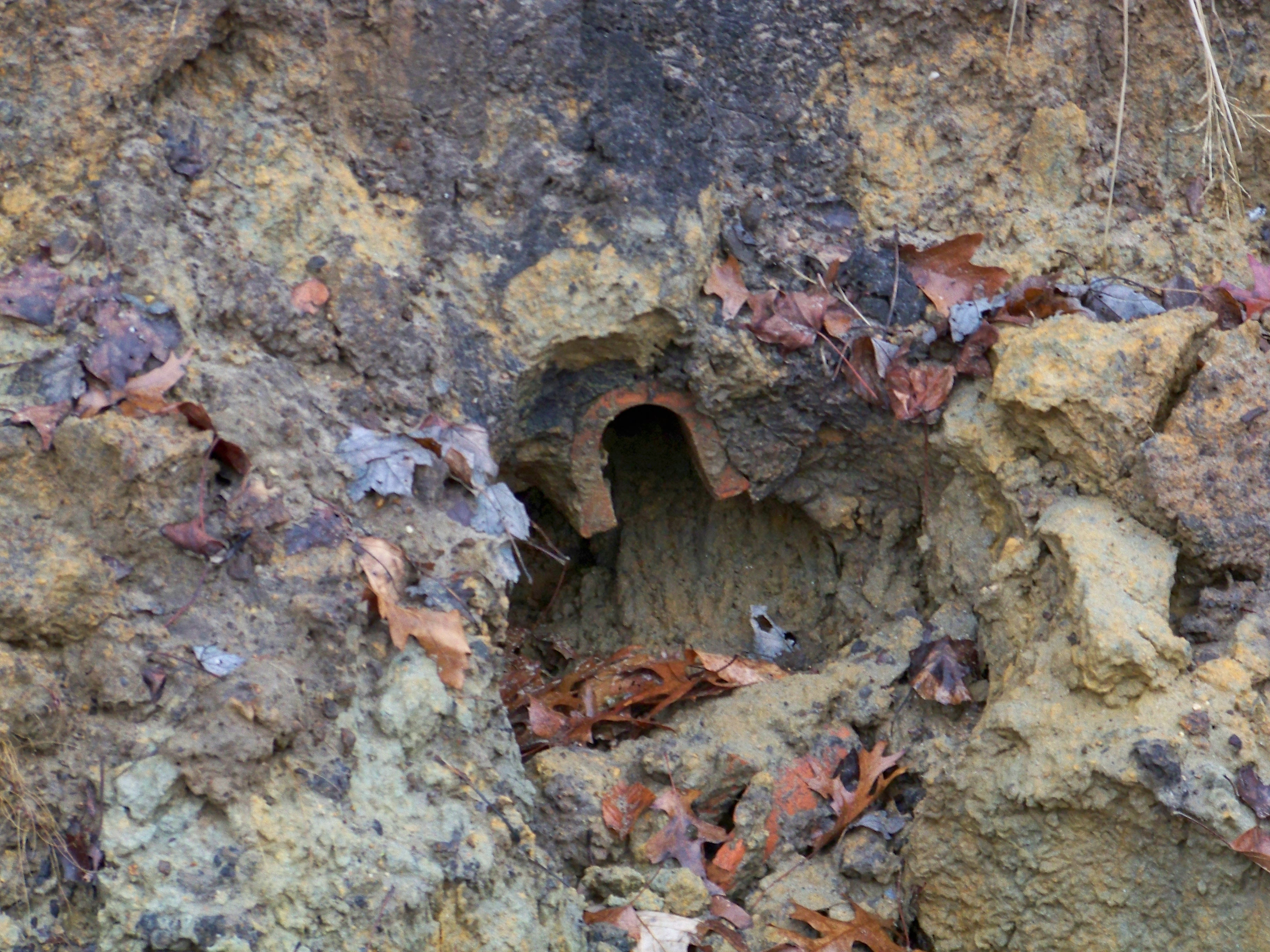
Drain tile in ground from same site

The ancient Roman authors Cato the Elder and Pliny the Elder described tile drainage systems in 200 BC and the first century AD, respectively. According to the Johnston Farm, tile drainage was first introduced to the United States in 1838, when John Johnston used the practice from his native Scotland on his new farm in Seneca County, New York. Johnston laid 72 miles (116 km) of clay tile on 320 acres (1.3 km^{2}). The effort increased his yield of wheat from 12 bushels per acre to 60. Johnston, the "father of tile drainage in America", continued to advocate for tile drainage throughout his life, attributing his agricultural success to the formula "D, C, and D", i. e., dung, credit, and drainage.

The expansion of drainage systems was an important technical aspect of Westward Expansion in the United States in the 19th century. Although land in the United States was divided according to the Public Land Survey System that the Land Ordinance of 1785 instituted, development, especially of agricultural land, was often limited by the rate at which it was made capable for cultivation. For example, although Iowa was admitted as a state of the United States in 1846, maps that depicted ownership of land indicated below-average densities of population in the northwestern region of Iowa as late as the 1870s, this being a corner of the state still known for its high water table and numerous lakes and wetlands.

Western states had similar limitations to agricultural intensification. Many states offered governmental incentives to improve land for agriculture. For example, legislation in Indiana prompted a Federal statute in 1850 that provided for the sale of swamps at discount to farmers contingent on their drainage of the land and improvement of it for agricultural productivity. To facilitate such improvement, most states instituted governmental agencies to regulate the installation of tile drainage. Even presently, local elections in more rural states often include election of members of drainage supervisory boards; e. g., in Michigan the County Drain Commissioner remains popularly elected.

In the decades after the American Civil War drainage systems were rapidly expanded. For example, historical literature from Ohio records that in 1882 the number of acres drained was approximately equal to the area of land that was drained in all previous years. In the 1930s the Civilian Conservation Corps augmented the tile drainage systems throughout the Midwest, much of which is still used.

== Advances in drainage technology ==
Until after World War II, the technology of tile installation remained similar to the methods first used in 1838. Although cement sections later replaced the original clay tiles, and machines were used to dig the trenches for the tile lines, the process remained quite labor-intensive and limited to specialized contractors.

The first successful mechanical trencher for drainage tile was James B. Hill's Buckeye Steam Traction Ditcher, invented in the late 1880s. Hill's ditching machines drained the Great Black Swamp in Ohio. As of 1995, some of his machines were still in use in New Orleans, Louisiana; Ontario, Canada; and parts of Africa.

The introduction of plastic tile served to reduce both the cost of tile installation, as well as the amount of labor involved. Rather than set individual sections of cement tile end-to-end in the trench, tile installers had only to unroll a continuous section of lightweight, flexible tile line. Towards the end of the twentieth century, when large, four-wheel-drive tractors became more common on American farms, do-it-yourself tile implements appeared on the market. By making tile installation cheaper and allowing it to be done on the landowner's schedule, farmers are capable of draining localized wet spots that may not create enough of a problem to merit more costly operations. In this way, farmers may enjoy increases in crop yield while saving on the capital costs of tile installation.

== Social and ecological effects of tile drainage ==
Ecologically, the expansion of drainage systems has had tremendous negative effects. Hundreds of thousands of wetland species experienced significant population declines as their habitat was increasingly fragmented and converted to other uses. Although market hunting within the Central Flyway was a contributing factor in the decline of many waterfowl species' numbers in the early decades of the twentieth century, loss of breeding habitat to agricultural expansion is certainly the most significant. Early maps of midwestern states depict many lakes and marshes that are nonexistent or significantly reduced in area today. Channelization, a related process of concentrating and facilitating water flow from agricultural areas, also contributed to this degradation.

Tile drainage and the corresponding changes to the landscape - draining wetlands, wet soils, and channelizing streams – have contributed to more erosive rivers. This response of rivers due to drainage is the result of shortening the residence time of water on the landscape. For example, precipitation used to be held in wetlands and in/on the surface of soils, continuously evaporating or being used via the transpiration of plants. Water would slowly drain through the landscape and eventually drain into rivers. The process of tile drainage, used to dry soils quickly and efficiently, results in an efficient transmission of water to the river – so efficient that higher volumes of water are delivered to rivers. The effect of higher volumes of water is more energy in water - the dynamic equilibrium state that rivers existed in for centuries (slowly changing shape and continuously transporting limited sediment) was, and currently is, out of balance. This loss of equilibrium results in extreme amounts of bank erosion, which results in over-burdensome sediment loads and critical impacts on natural environments and riverine habitats.

Drainage tile sometimes decreases soil erosion and runoff of some nutrients, including phosphorus. Phosphorus is a crucial nutrient to control because it is the limiting nutrient in most aquatic ecosystems. Thus, phosphorus is the main culprit in the eutrophication of surface water; however, the other limiting nutrient, nitrogen, causes substantial water quality damage. For example, nitrogen has been implicated in the gulf hypoxia. Drainage tile sometimes increases water quality because the water flows into the ground, then the tile, instead of running off the field into a ditch, carrying soil and nutrients with it. The soil can filter the water before it enters the streams and rivers. However, by bypassing surface improvements like conservation tillage or riparian buffers, tile drainage can also create problems with water quality and outflow from tile drainage tends to be extremely high in nitrogen. Furthermore, tile drainage sometimes contains very high levels of other chemicals. Since surface forms of conservation agriculture are less effective in tile-drained systems, different practices, such as controlled drainage or constructed wetlands, may be more effective. In very flat areas, where the natural topography does not provide the gradient necessary for water flow, "agricultural wells" can be dug to provide tile lines with sufficient outlet. However, drainage wells can place groundwater quality at risk.

Intensive livestock operations (ILO)/concentrated animal feeding operations (CAFOs) have led to challenges in livestock effluent disposal. Livestock effluent contains valuable nutrients, but misapplication of these materials can lead to serious ecological problems, such as nutrient loading. Injecting effluent directly into the ground is one method manure applicators employ to improve nutrient uptake. Drainage tiles may increase injected manure seepage into surface waterways from manure injection because liquid manure seeps through soils and drains out of the field and into waterways via drainage tiles.

Today, several state and federal initiatives serve to reverse habitat loss. Many programs encourage and even reimburse farmers for interrupting the drainage of localized wet spots on their property, often by breaking tile inlets or removing tile drains. Landowners are often partially or fully compensated for forfeiting the ability to grow crops on this land. Such programs and the cooperation of landowners across the country have significant positive effects on the populations of various waterfowl.

== See also ==
- Drainage
- Drainage equation
- Drainage system (agriculture)
- Watertable control
- Salinity control by subsurface drainage
- Drain spacing equation using the energy balance of groundwater flow
- Drainage research
- Wateringue (drainage)
