= Bray-Dunes =

Bray-Dunes Bray-Duunen
- Commune
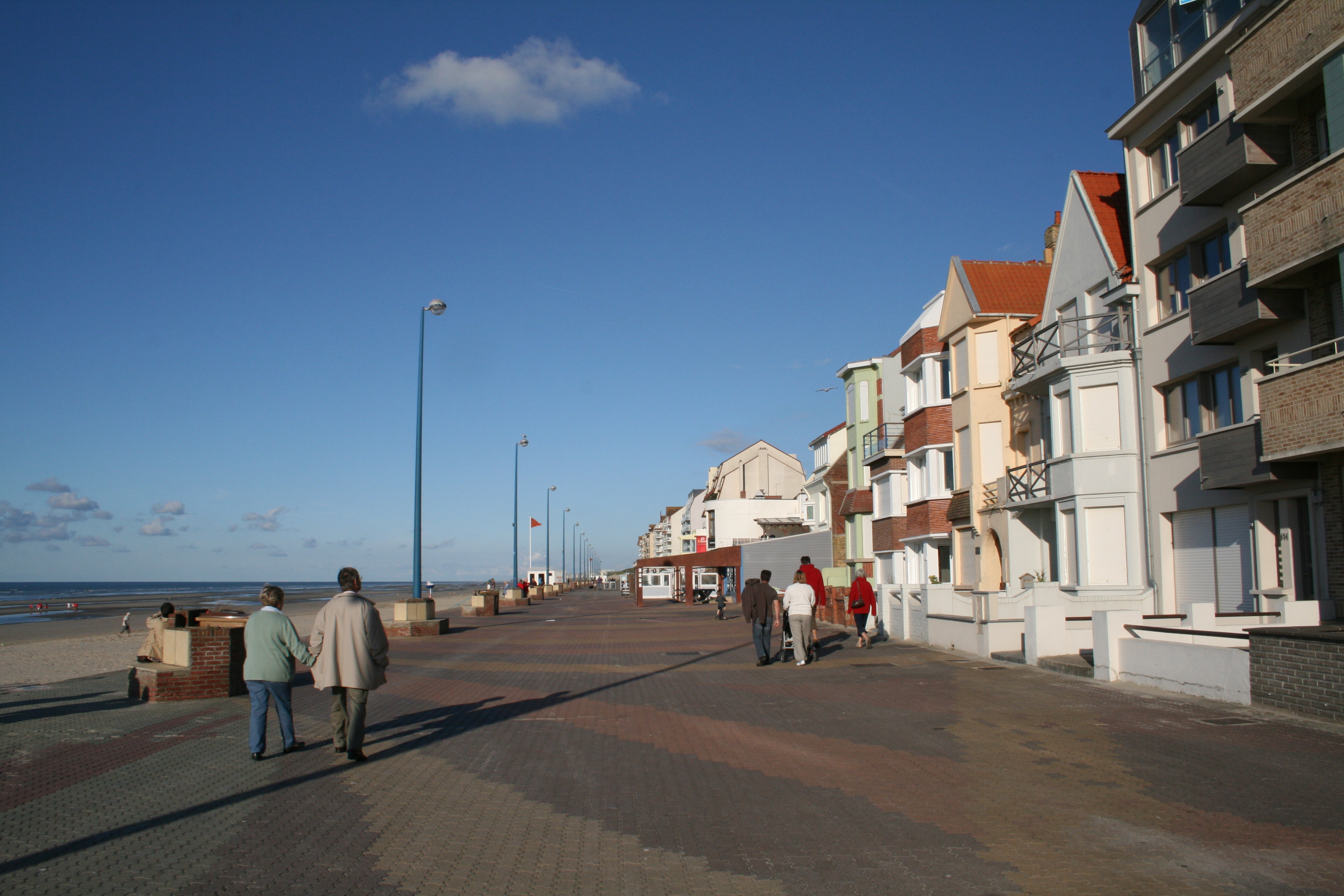
- The promenade at Bray-Dunes

- Flag Coat of arms
- Location of Bray-Dunes
- Location within France Location within Hauts-de-France
- Coordinates: 51°04′18″N 2°31′42″E
- Country: France
- Region: Hauts-de-France
- Department: Nord
- Arrondissement: Dunkerque
- Canton: Dunkerque-2
- Intercommunality: Dunkerque

Government
  - Mayor (2020–2026): Christine Gilloots
- Area^{1}: 8.57 km^{2} (3.31 sq mi)
- Elevation: 8 m (26 ft)
- Highest elevation: 29 m (95 ft)
- Lowest elevation: 0 m (0 ft)
- Population (2023): 4,189
  - Density: 489/km^{2} (1,270/sq mi)
- Time zone: UTC+01:00 (CET)
  - Summer (DST): UTC+02:00 (CEST)
- INSEE/Postal code: 59107 /59123
- ^{1} French Land Register data, which excludes lakes, ponds, glaciers > 1 km^{2} (0.386 sq mi or 247 acres) and river estuaries.

Bray-Dunes (French pronunciation: [bʁɛ dyn]; West Flemish: Bray-Duunn) is a commune in the Nord department in northern France. It is situated on the Belgian border, with Adinkerke being the closest Belgian town. Bray-Dunes is the northernmost commune and the northernmost point in all of France (mainland and overseas territories).

Bray-Dunes was the site of many casualties during World War II as a result of the Dunkirk evacuation.

== Population ==
Historical population
Year	Pop.	±% p.a.
1968	3,673	—
1975	4,765	+3.79%
1982	4,777	+0.04%
1990	4,755	−0.06%
1999	4,557	−0.47%
2007	4,681	+0.34%
2012	4,609	−0.31%
2017	4,483	−0.55%
2023	4,189	−1.12%
Source: INSEE

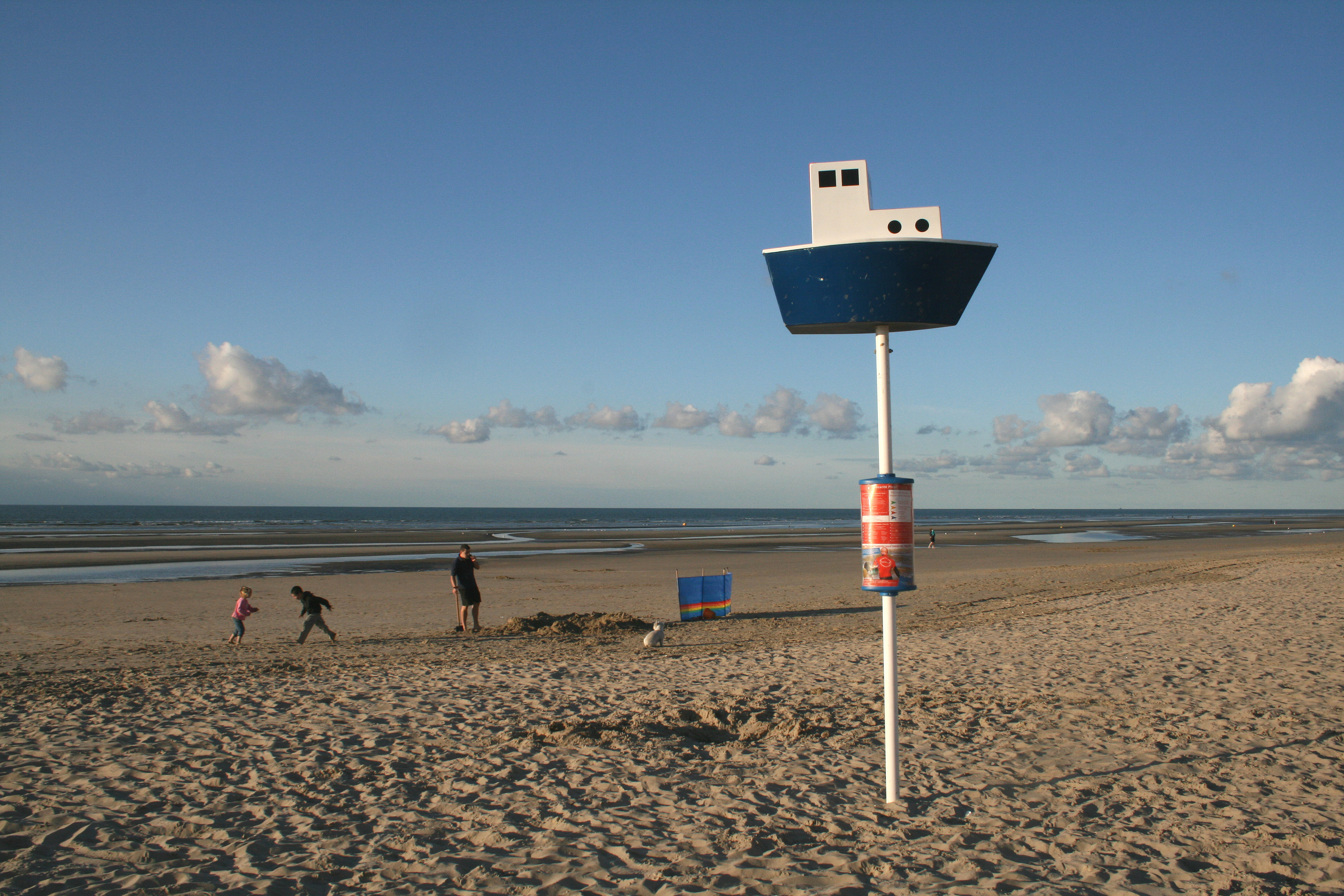
Beach of Bray-Dunes

== Heraldry ==
Arms of Bray-Dunes	The arms of Bray-Dunes are blazoned: Azure, an anchor with hawser, in sinister chief a mullet of 6 argent, on a chief ermine, a bend gules charged with 3 escallops Or.

Flag of Bray-Dunes

== See also ==
- Communes of the Nord department
- Lamanère, the southernmost commune of Continental France
